= Jinhai Lake station =

Metro station in Shanghai, China

Jinhai Lake 金海湖
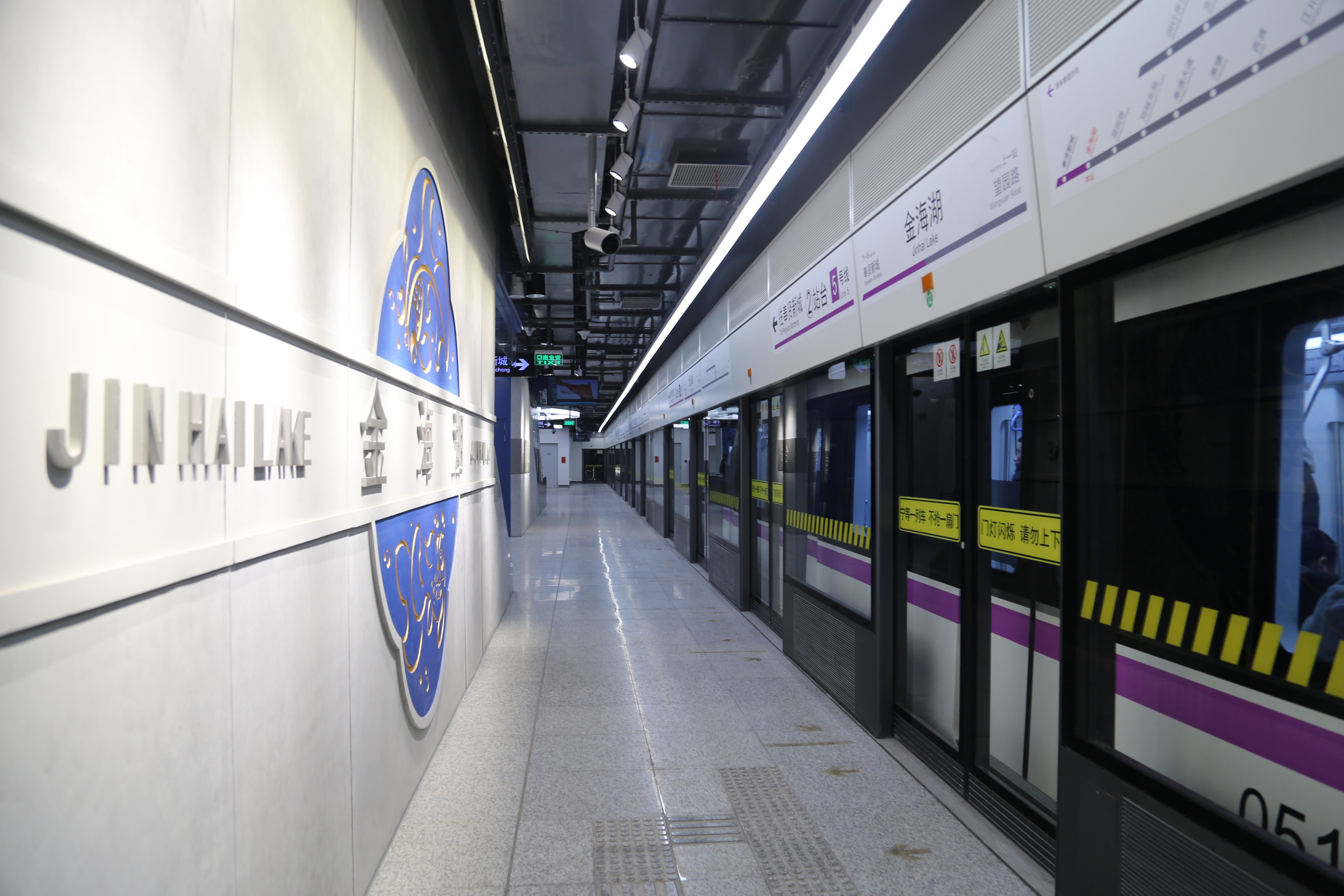
- Station platform, Fengxian Xincheng-bound side

General information
- Location: Zefeng Road and Jinhai Highway, Fengxian District, Shanghai; China
- Coordinates: 30.931641°N 121.487621°E
- Operated by: Shanghai No. 1 Metro Operation Co. Ltd.
- Line: Line 5
- Platforms: 2 (1 island platform)
- Tracks: 2

Construction
- Structure type: Underground
- Accessible: Yes

History
- Opened: 30 December 2018

Services
Preceding station	Shanghai Metro	Following station
Wangyuan Road towards Xinzhuang	Line 5	Fengxian Xincheng Terminus
Location

Jinhai Lake (Chinese: 金海湖; pinyin: Jīnhǎi Hú) is a station on Line 5 of the Shanghai Metro. Located at Zefeng Road and Jinhai Highway in the city's Fengxian District, the station is located on the main branch of Line 5 and opened as part of the southern extension of Line 5 on 30 December 2018. It is an underground station.

The station is located between Wangyuan Road and Fengxian Xincheng.
