= Jianchuan Road station =

Shanghai Metro station

Jianchuan Road 剑川路
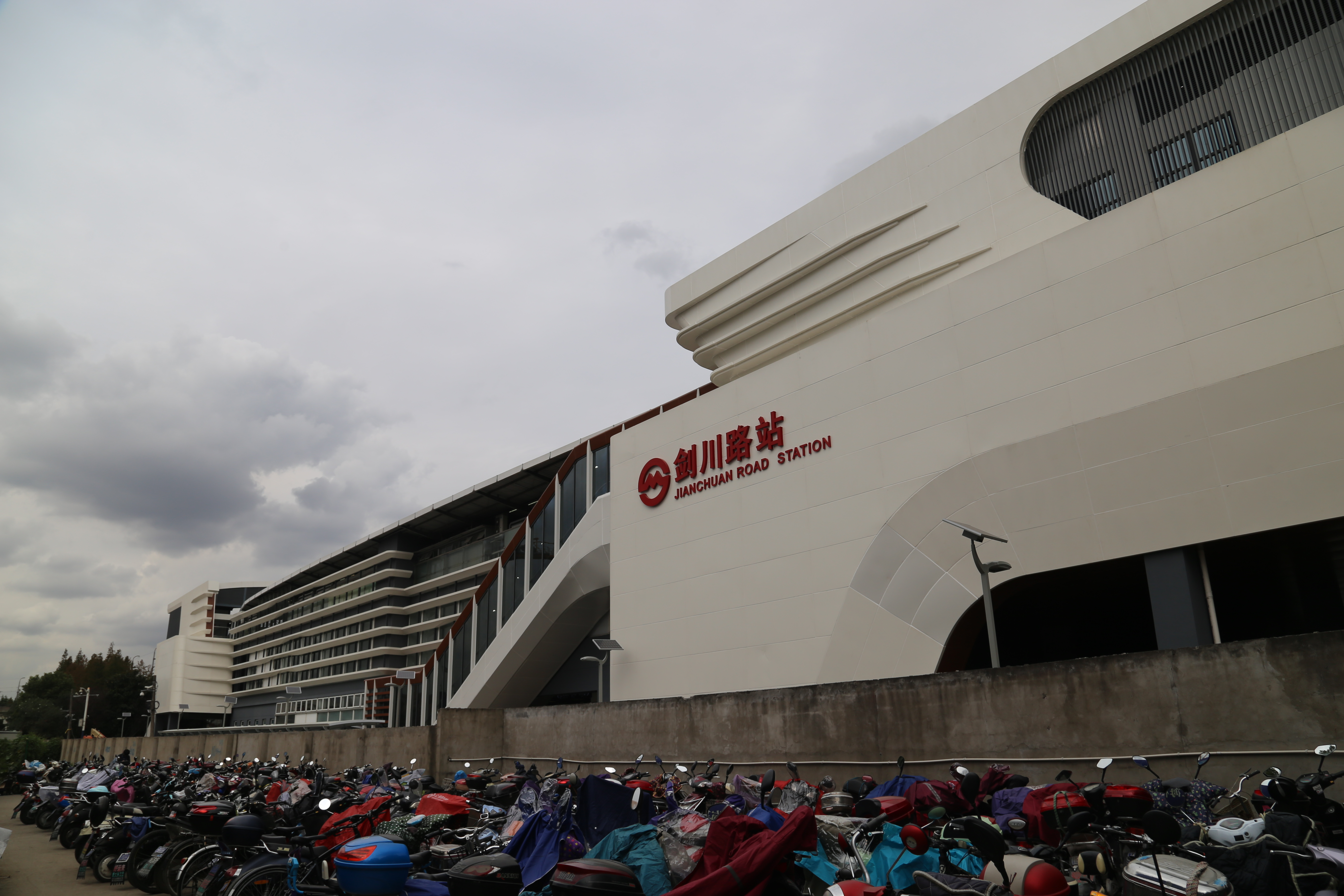
- Station exterior

General information
- Location: Humin Road and Jianchuan Road; Minhang District, Shanghai; China
- Coordinates: 31.0281°N 121.412°E
- Operator: Shanghai No. 1 Metro Operation Co. Ltd.
- Line: Line 5
- Platforms: 2 (2 side platforms)
- Tracks: 2

Construction
- Structure type: Elevated
- Accessible: Yes

History
- Opened: 25 November 2003

Services
Preceding station	Shanghai Metro	Following station
Beiqiao towards Xinzhuang	Line 5	Dongchuan Road towards Fengxian Xincheng or Minhang Development Zone
Location
- Location within Shanghai

Jianchuan Road (simplified Chinese: 剑川路; traditional Chinese: 劍川路; pinyin: Jiànchuān Lù) is an above-ground station on Line 5 of the Shanghai Metro. Located at the intersection of Humin Highway and Jianchuan Road in the city's Minhang District, the station opened with the rest of the first phase of Line 5 on 25 November 2003. Between 28 December 2018 and 26 December 2020, passengers who wish to travel to stations on the branch line of Line 5 between Dongchuan Road and Minhang Development Zone stations must transfer to four-car trains at Dongchuan Road station. Since 26 December 2020, both the main and the branch line trains run all the way to Xinzhuang with no shuttle service.
