= Beiqiao station =

Shanghai Metro station

Beiqiao 北桥
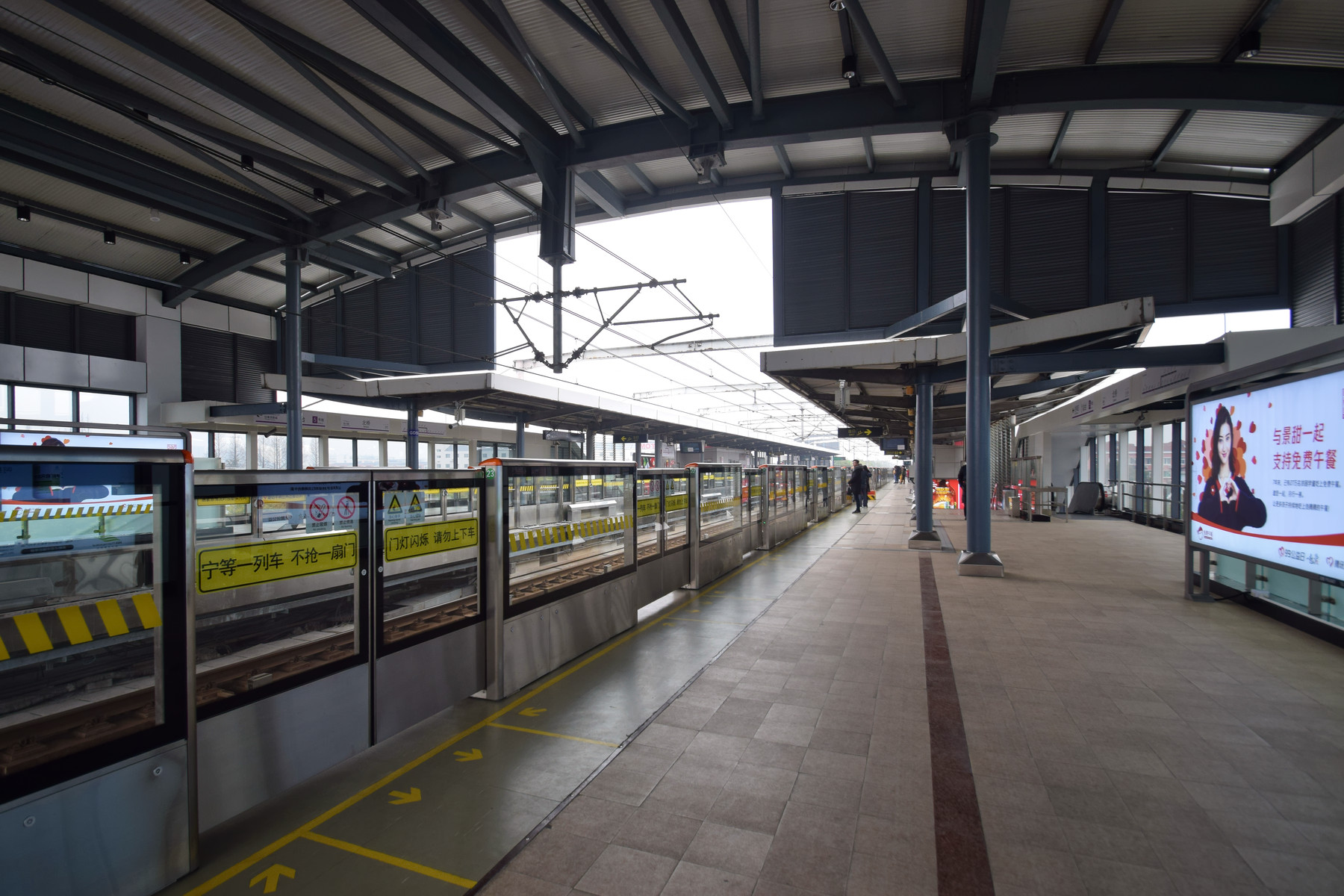
- Station platform, Xinzhuang-bound side

General information
- Location: Humin Road and Beisong Highway (北松公路); Minhang District, Shanghai; China
- Coordinates: 31.0470°N 121.4054°E
- Operator: Shanghai No. 1 Metro Operation Co. Ltd.
- Line: Line 5
- Platforms: 2 (2 side platforms)
- Tracks: 2

Construction
- Structure type: Elevated
- Accessible: Yes

History
- Opened: 25 November 2003

Services
| Preceding station | Shanghai Metro | Following station |
|---|---|---|
| Zhuanqiao towards Xinzhuang | Line 5 | Jianchuan Road towards Fengxian Xincheng or Minhang Development Zone |
Location
- Location within Shanghai

Beiqiao (simplified Chinese: 北桥; traditional Chinese: 北橋; pinyin: Běiqiáo) is an above-ground station on Line 5 of the Shanghai Metro. Located at the intersection of Humin Highway and Beisong Highway in the city's Minhang District, the station opened with the rest of the first phase of Line 5 on 25 November 2003. Between 28 December 2018 and 26 December 2020, passengers who wish to travel to stations on the branch line of Line 5 between Dongchuan Road and Minhang Development Zone stations must transfer to four-car trains at Dongchuan Road station. Since 26 December 2020, both the main and the branch line trains run all the way to Xinzhuang with no shuttle service.
