= Jiamin Line =

Future rail line in Shanghai, China

- Jiamin

Overview
- Other names: L3 (planned name Shanghai Metro); Line 17 (planned name Shanghai Metro up to 2011)
- Status: Under construction
- Locale: Shanghai, China
- Termini: Yindu Road; Chengbei Road
- Connecting lines: 1 2 5 9 10 11 12 13 14 22 25 Airport Link
- Stations: 15

Service
- Type: Commuter rail
- System: Shanghai Suburban Railway
- Operator(s): Shentong Metro Group
- Rolling stock: China Railway CRH6

History
- Commenced: June 28, 2021; 4 years ago
- Planned opening: 2027

Technical
- Line length: 44.04 km (27 mi) km
- Number of tracks: 2
- Track gauge: 1,435 mm (4 ft 8 1/2 in)
- Electrification: Overhead lines (AC 25 kV)
- Operating speed: 160 km/h (99 mph)

Jiamin Line (Chinese: 嘉闵线; pinyin: Jiāmǐn xiàn) is a commuter rail line currently under construction on the Shanghai Suburban Railway, and will be run by Shentong Metro Group. It runs from Yindu Road in Minhang District to Chengbei Road in Jiading District. Construction started on 28 June 2021. The line is expected to open in 2027.

== Proposed Stations ==
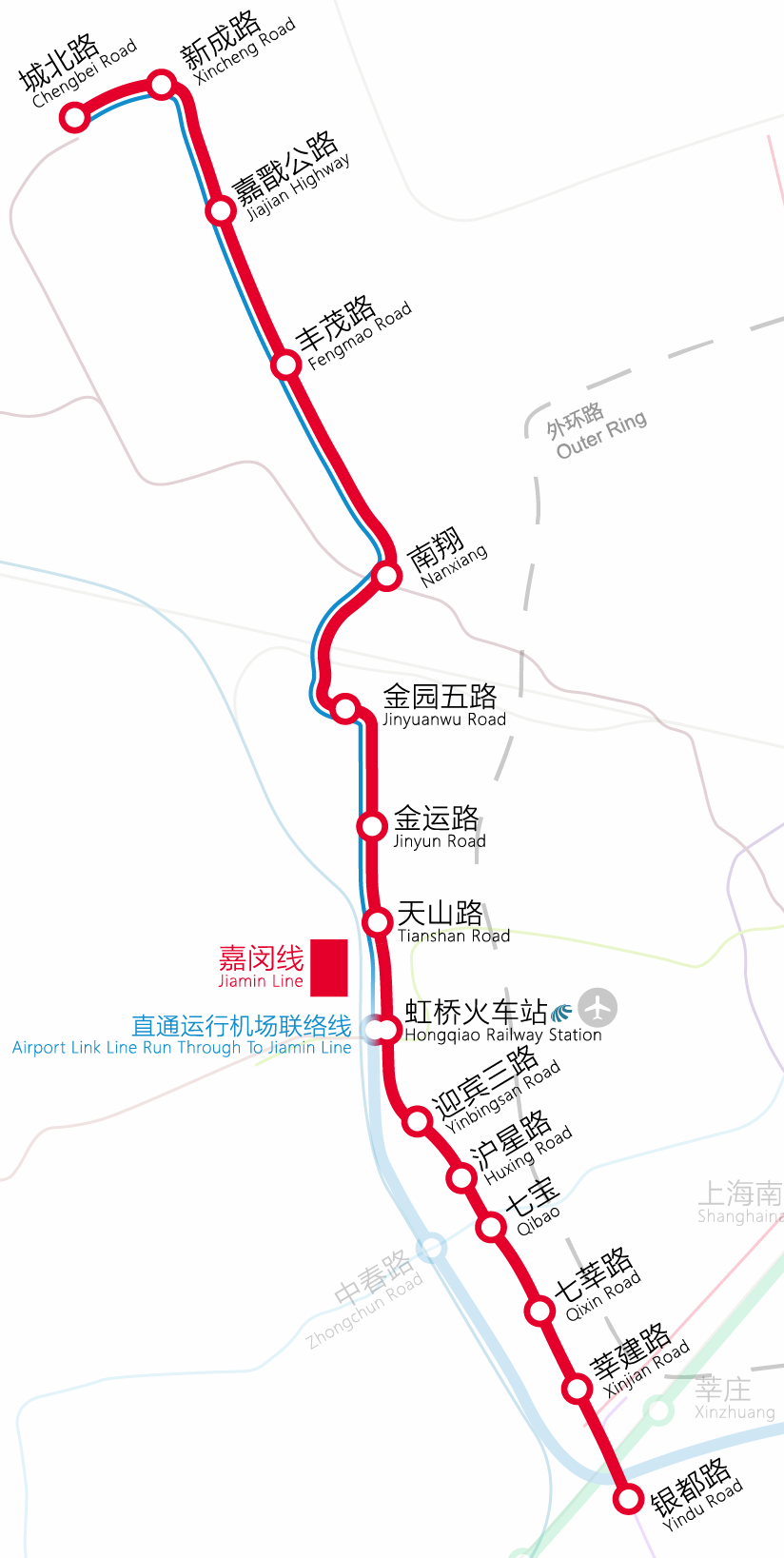
Map of Jiamin Line.

Station name		Connections	Distance km		Location	Open- ing
English	Chinese	Connections	Distance km		Location	Open- ing
Yindu Road	银都路	5	0.0	0.0	Minhang	Phase I 2027
Xinjian Road	莘建路		2.123	2.123	Minhang	Phase I 2027
Qixin Road	七莘路	12	2.991	5.114	Minhang	Phase I 2027
Qibao	七宝	9	2.843	7.957	Minhang	Phase I 2027
Huxing Road	沪星路		1.218	9.175	Minhang	Phase I 2027
Yingbinsan Road	迎宾三路		2.079	11.254	Minhang	Phase I 2027
Hongqiao Airport Terminal 2	虹桥2号航站楼站	2 10 17 (via Hongqiao Railway Station); Airport Link Demonstration Area (Note: Will have through trains to/from both lines.); AOH	2.417	13.671	Minhang	Phase I 2027
Tianshan Road	天山路		2.859	16.530	Minhang	Phase I 2027
Jinyun Road	金运路	13	2.250	18.780	Jiading	Phase I 2027
Lexiu Road	乐秀路	14	3.275	22.075	Jiading	Phase I 2027
Nanxiang	南翔	11	3.815	25.870	Jiading	Phase I 2027
Fengmao Road	丰茂路		7.179	33.049	Jiading	Phase I 2027
Jiajian Highway	嘉戬公路		3.236	36.285	Jiading	Phase I 2027
Xincheng Road	新成路		3.883	40.168	Jiading	Phase I 2027
Chengbei Road	城北路	11 (via North Jiading)	3.086	43.255	Jiading	Phase I 2027

=== Important stations ===
Except for the Hongqiao hub section, which is laid on the ground, the length of the ground section is 2.68 kilometers, and the rest are all underground sections, the length of which is 41.36 kilometers. There are 14 underground stations and 1 ground station on the whole line. It adopts EMU trains with a maximum operating speed of 160 km/h, and a combined fast and slow train transportation mode.

The line has double island platforms in some stations, allowing express/local services.

=== Future extensions ===
Shanghai Commuter Rail Jiamin line with extension to Taicang

The line is expected to be extended north to Taicang in neighboring Jiangsu Province in the future.
