= Shanghai Metro AC11 =

Rolling stock of Shanghai Metro Line 5

Shanghai Metro 05C01 AC11
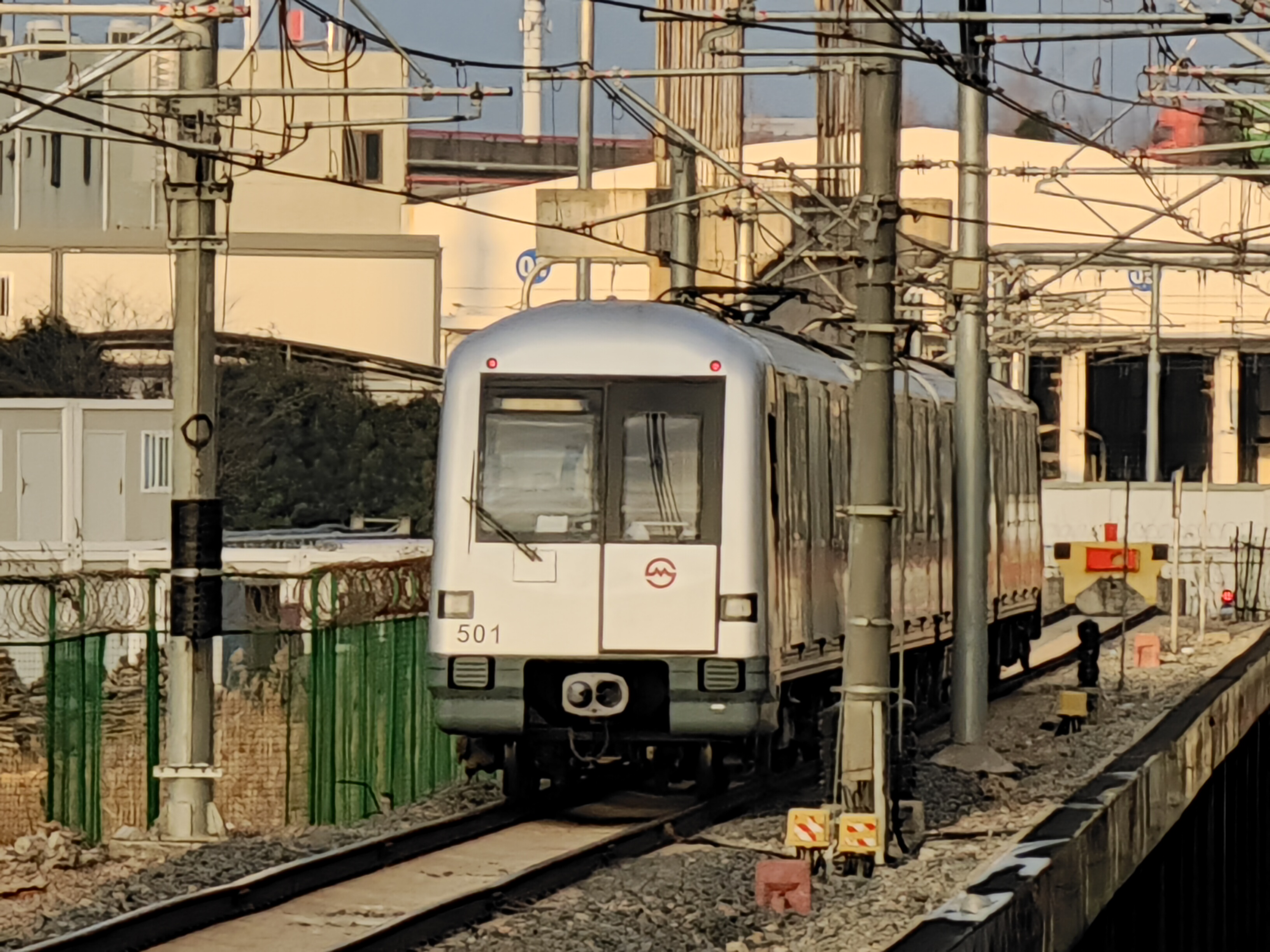
- An 05C01 train at Xinzhuang station sidings.
- Stock type: Class C EMU
- In service: 25 November 2003-present
- Manufacturer: Alstom
- Built at: Shanghai, China
- Family name: Metropolis
- Constructed: 2002-2004
- Entered service: 25 November 2003
- Number built: 68
- Number in service: 68
- Formation: Tc+Mp+Mp+Tc
- Fleet numbers: 02011-02041, 03011-03401 and 04011-04241
- Capacity: 200 per car
- Operator: Shentong Metro Group
- Depot: Jianchuan Road Depot
- Line served: 5

Specifications
- Car body construction: Aluminum alloy
- Train length: 77.86 m (255 ft 5 in)
- Car length: 19.44 m (63 ft 9 in)
- Width: 2.6 m (8 ft 6 in)
- Height: 3.8 m (12 ft 6 in)
- Doors: Electric doors
- Maximum speed: 80 km/h (50 mph)
- Traction system: Alstom ONIX 1500 IGBT-VVVF
- Traction motors: Alstom 4LCA-2132 3-phases AC induction motors
- Acceleration: Maximum 2.9 km/(h⋅s) (1.802 mph/s)
- Deceleration: 3.6 km/(h⋅s) (2.237 mph/s) (service); 4.3 km/(h⋅s) (2.672 mph/s) (emergency)
- Electric systems: 1,500 V DC
- Current collection: Single-arm Pantograph
- Bogies: Alstom B25
- Safety systems: Thales TSTCBTC 2.0 (CBTC, DTO/GoA3)
- Track gauge: 4 ft 8 1/2 in (1,435 mm)

The 05C01 (formerly known as AC11) is a current rolling stock built by Alstom for Line 5 of Shanghai Metro. A total of 68 cars (17 sets) were built. Entering service between 2003 and 2004. They commonly run service on Xinzhuang station - Minhang Development Zone station section.

In 2014, AC11 was renamed 05C01.

== Features ==
AC11 is developed from Warsaw Metro 98B. They have liveries in red, orange and yellow. They utilize the same traction systems and motors as AC03s, which also applied on the subsequent Alstom rolling stocks of Shanghai Metro: AC06s, AC07s, AC08s and AC12s.

Unlike the other rolling stocks in Shanghai Metro, AC11s have no gangways between each car.

== Signalling upgrade ==
Between 2017 and 2018, 05C01 cars were overhauled and modernized by Alstom. The signalling system has been upgraded to DTO.

== See also ==
- Alstom Metropolis 98B
- Shanghai Metro AC07
- Shanghai Metro AC12
