= Shanghai Minhang High School =

High school in Shanghai, China

- Chinese: 上海市闵行中学

Information
- School type: Secondary school
- Established: 1928; 98 years ago

Shanghai Minhang High School (Chinese: 上海市闵行中学; pinyin: Mǐnháng Zhōngxué) is a municipal public secondary school in Minhang, Shanghai, China. The school is supervised by Shanghai City Minhang District Education Bureau.

In 2007, Minhang High School was selected as an Experimental Model High Schools (实验性示范高中) in Shanghai.
