= Xinzhuang, Shanghai =

Town in Shanghai

Xinzhuang Town 莘庄镇
- Town
- Location within Shanghai Location within China
- Coordinates: 31°7′23″N 121°21′56″E
- Country: China
- Municipality: Shanghai
- District: Minhang
- Village-level Divisions: 54 communities 1 village

Xinzhuang (simplified Chinese: 莘庄; traditional Chinese: 莘莊; pinyin: Xīnzhuāng) is a town located in Minhang District, Shanghai, China. The town was, by the early 21st century, essentially walking toward the greater Shanghai urban area. On April 15, 1999, Korean Air Cargo Flight 6316 crashed in Xinzhuang, killing all three people on board along with five more people on the ground.

== Administrative Division ==
As of 2023, Xinzhuang Town is divided into 54 communities and 1 village:

| Administrative Division Code | Community Names | Name Transliteration | Type |
|---|---|---|---|
| 310112101001 | 东街 | Dongjie | Community |
| 310112101003 | 西街 | Xijie | Community |
| 310112101005 | 莘松一村 | Xinsongyicun | Community |
| 310112101007 | 莘松三村 | Xinsongsancun | Community |
| 310112101009 | 莘松四村 | Xinsongsicun | Community |
| 310112101010 | 莘松五村 | Xinsongwucun | Community |
| 310112101014 | 莘松九村 | Xinsongjiucun | Community |
| 310112101015 | 绿梅一村 | Lümeiyicun | Community |
| 310112101016 | 绿梅二村 | Lümeiercun | Community |
| 310112101018 | 绿梅三村 | Lümeisancun | Community |
| 310112101020 | 水清一村 | Shuiqingyicun | Community |
| 310112101021 | 水清三村 | Shuiqingsancun | Community |
| 310112101022 | 报春第一 | Baochundiyi | Community |
| 310112101023 | 报春第二 | Baochundier | Community |
| 310112101024 | 佳佳花园 | Jiajiahuayuan | Community |
| 310112101025 | 黎安新村第一 | Lianxincundiyi | Community |
| 310112101026 | 黎安新村第二 | Lianxincundier | Community |
| 310112101030 | 西湖苑 | Xihuyuan | Community |
| 310112101031 | 沁春园二村 | Qinchunyuanercun | Community |
| 310112101032 | 新梅花苑 | Xinmeihuayuan | Community |
| 310112101033 | 绿世界 | Lüshijie | Community |
| 310112101034 | 星丰苑 | Xingfengyuan | Community |
| 310112101036 | 莘南花苑 | Xinnanhuayuan | Community |
| 310112101037 | 莘城公寓 | Xinchenggongyu | Community |
| 310112101038 | 团结花苑 | Tuanjiehuayuan | Community |
| 310112101039 | 宝安新苑 | Bao'anxinyuan | Community |
| 310112101040 | 新申花城 | Xinshenhuacheng | Community |
| 310112101042 | 众众家园 | Zhongzhongjiayuan | Community |
| 310112101044 | 莘城苑 | Xinchengyuan | Community |
| 310112101045 | 丽华公寓 | Lihuagongyu | Community |
| 310112101046 | 圣淘沙花园 | Shengtaoshahuayuan | Community |
| 310112101047 | 莘纪苑 | Xinjiyuan | Community |
| 310112101048 | 新梅广场 | Xinmeiguangchang | Community |
| 310112101049 | 虹莘新村 | Hongxinxincun | Community |
| 310112101050 | 春申新村 | Chunshenxincun | Community |
| 310112101051 | 香树丽舍 | Xiangshulishe | Community |
| 310112101052 | 沁春园一村 | Qinchunyuanyicun | Community |
| 310112101053 | 西环新村 | Xihuanxincun | Community |
| 310112101054 | 世纪名门 | Shijimingmen | Community |
| 310112101056 | 名都新城 | Mingduxincheng | Community |
| 310112101057 | 阳明花苑 | Yangminghuayuan | Community |
| 310112101059 | 康城第一 | Kangchengdiyi | Community |
| 310112101060 | 世纪阳光园 | Shijiyangguangyuan | Community |
| 310112101061 | 春申复地城 | Chunshenfudicheng | Community |
| 310112101062 | 春申万科城 | Chunshenwankecheng | Community |
| 310112101063 | 东苑新天地 | Dongyuanxintiandi | Community |
| 310112101064 | 东苑利华苑 | Dongyuanlihuayuan | Community |
| 310112101065 | 沁春园第三 | Qinchunyuandisan | Community |
| 310112101066 | 都市星城 | Dushixingcheng | Community |
| 310112101067 | 上海康城第二 | Shanghaikangchengdier | Community |
| 310112101068 | 邻里苑 | Linliyuan | Community |
| 310112101069 | 康城第三 | Kangchengdisan | Community |
| 310112101070 | 康城第四 | Kangchengdisi | Community |
| 310112101071 | 莘东两湾苑 | Xindongliangwanyuan | Community |
| 310112101203 | 青春 | Qingchun | Village |

== Transport ==
The Xinzhuang Metro Station is located in the east of Xinzhuang, providing access to Metro Line 1 and Line 5, and will provide access to Jinshan Railway in the near future. To the north and south of the station are 2 squares. In the northern square there was a bus terminal providing services to the local Xinzhuang areas (Now is under re-construction because of the Project Tianhui); at the southern square there is a bus terminal connects Xinzhuang with a number of surrounding regional areas.

== Religion ==
A Three-Self Patriotic Movement Protestant Church is located in the south of Xinzhuang.
