= Pingzhuang Highway station =

Metro station in Shanghai, China

Pingzhuang Highway 平庄公路

General information
- Location: Pingzhuang Road and Jinhai Highway; Fengxian District, Shanghai; China
- Coordinates: 30.890373°N 121.497287°E
- Operated by: Shanghai No. 1 Metro Operation Co. Ltd.
- Line: Line 5

Construction
- Structure type: Elevated
Location

Pingzhuang Highway (simplified Chinese: 平庄公路; traditional Chinese: 平莊公路; pinyin: Píngzhuāng Gōnglù) is a future reserved station on an unopened section of Line 5 of the Shanghai Metro. Located at Pingzhuang Road and Jinhai Highway in the city's Fengxian District, the station is located on the main branch of Line 5 and resides on the southern extension of the line, which opened on 30 December 2018. However, the station did not open at the same time with the rest of the extension. The construction of the tracks through this station has been completed, but the station will not be built until a future date, pending completion of a transportation hub in the vicinity. When opened, it will become the southern terminus of the main branch of Line 5.
