= Line 5 (Shanghai Metro) =

Metro line in Shanghai, China

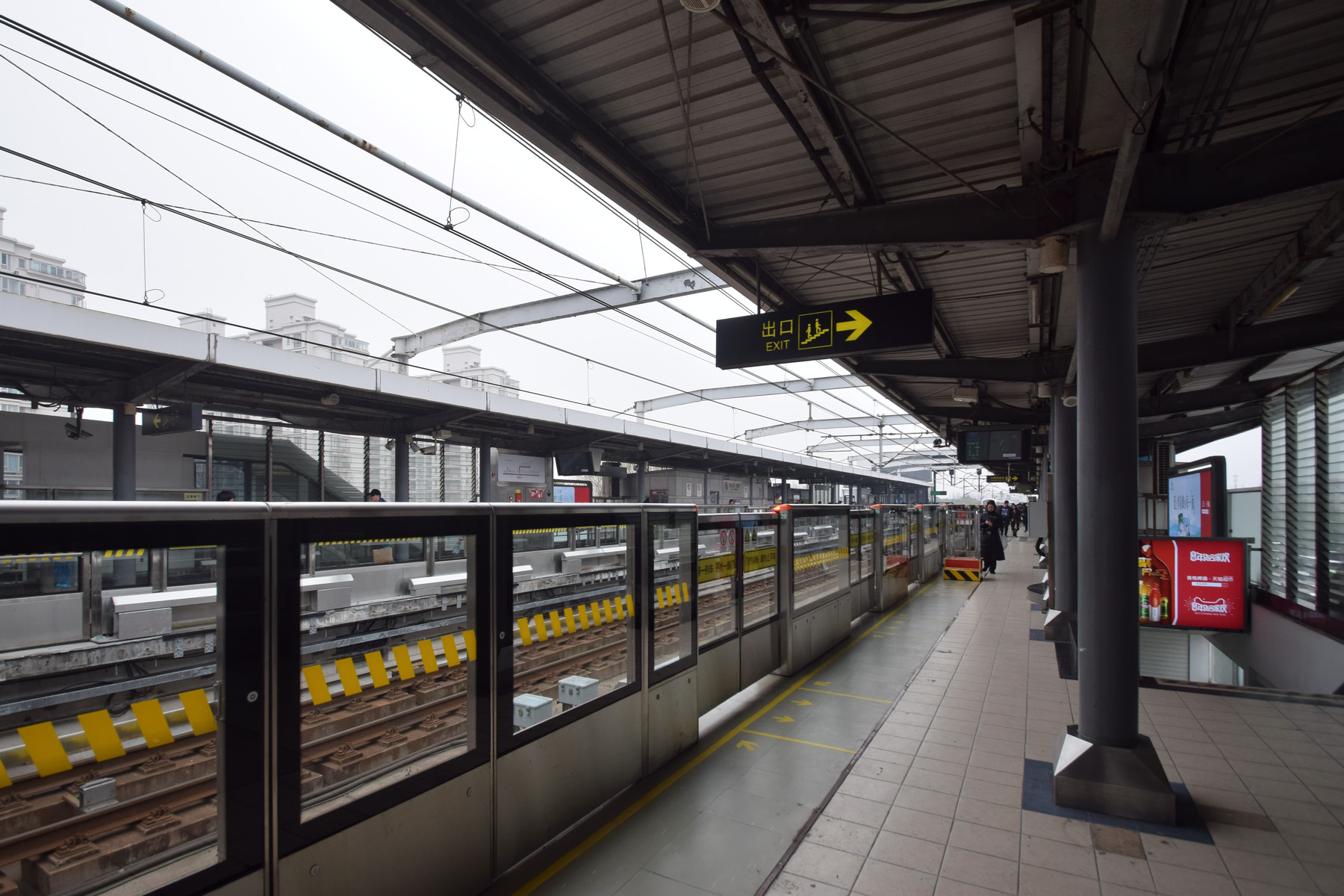
- The platform of Zhuanqiao station

Overview
- Other name(s): R1a (planned name); Xinmin line (Chinese: 莘闵线); Xinmin light rail (Chinese: 莘闵轻轨)
- Native name: 上海地铁5号线
- Status: Operational; Reserved southern extension to Pingzhuang Highway
- Owner: Shanghai Xinmin Rail Transit Line Development Co., Ltd. (phase 1); Shanghai Rail Transit Line 5 South Extension Development Co., Ltd. (phase 2)
- Locale: Minhang and Fengxian districts, Shanghai, China
- Termini: Xinzhuang; Minhang Development Zone / Fengxian Xincheng
- Stations: 19

Service
- Type: Rapid transit
- System: Shanghai Metro
- Services: Mainline: Xinzhuang ↔ Fengxian Xincheng; Branchline: Xinzhuang ↔ Minhang Development Zone
- Operator: Shanghai No. 1 Metro Operation Co. Ltd.
- Depot(s): Jianchuan Road Depot; Pingzhuang Highway Depot; Xinzhuang Yard
- Rolling stock: 05C01; 05C02
- Daily ridership: 222,000 (2019 peak)

History
- Work began: 28 February 1999; 27 years ago
- Opened: 25 November 2003; 22 years ago
- Last extension: 30 December 2018; 7 years ago

Technical
- Line length: 32.7 km (20.32 mi)
- Number of tracks: 2
- Character: Elevated & Underground
- Track gauge: 1,435 mm (4 ft 8 1/2 in)
- Electrification: Overhead lines (1500 volts)
- Operating speed: 80 km/h (50 mph); Average speed: 36.3 km/h (23 mph) (mainline); 35.5 km/h (22 mph) (branchline)
- Signalling: Thales, Shanghai Electric TSTCBTC2.0
Route map
Route on the Shanghai map:
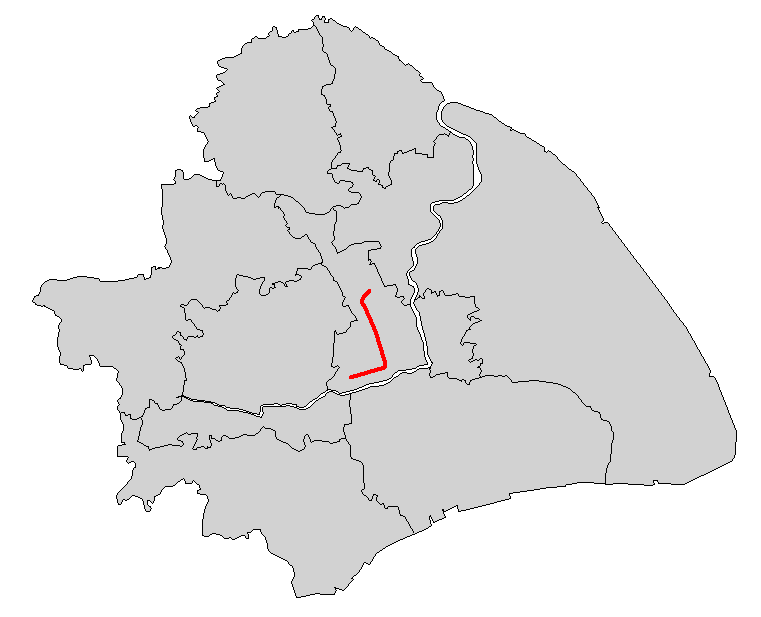
To scale geographic map:

Line 5 is a north–south rapid transit line of the Shanghai Metro network, running from Xinzhuang station in Minhang District in the north to Fengxian Xincheng in Fengxian District. The line was originally planned as the Minhang and Fengxian sections of line 1 extending south to Minhang. Despite its numeric designation, it was the fourth Shanghai Metro line to enter passenger service, opening on 25 November 2003. The line is colored violet on system maps.

== History ==
Line 5 was originally built under the direction of Minhang District and remains the only line in Shanghai Metro system that was originally built under the supervision of a county-level government.

In 1998, Minhang District authorities signed a contract with Shanghai Jiushi Group to build the line. In 2000, Shanghai Jiushi Group signed a contract between Alstom to purchase trains and started its construction. In 2002, Shanghai Modern Rail Transit Incorporated, a subsidiary of former Shanghai Bashi (Group), was given management of the line. The line entered passenger operations on 25 November 2003, on an initial segment between Xinzhuang and Minhang Development Zone stations, entirely within Minhang District.

Prior to integration with the rest of the Shanghai Metro network, it used its own ticketing system. In 2005, it was integrated with Shanghai Metro's ticketing system, which enabled an in-station interchange to line 1 at Xinzhuang station. At the same time, management and operation of the line was taken over by Shanghai No. 1 Metro Operation Co. Ltd.

=== Phase II extension and renovation ===
Phase two of the line, which would extend the line further south into Fengxian District, began construction on 30 July 2014. On 1 April 2015, a feasibility study for the extending of line 5 platforms, upgrading signals to support the use of higher-capacity six-car trains and renovation of tail tracks at Xinzhuang was approved. Due to these system upgrades, service on the existing line was cut back from Minhang Development Zone station to Jinping Road on 20 August 2018. Full service was restored on 20 October 2018. At the same time, the line began to operate as two separate services, being split at Dongchuan Road station, due to the anticipated opening of the phase two extension of line 5, which would create two branches of the line. Six-car trains began to run on the service between Xinzhuang and Dongchuan Road station. Passengers wishing to travel the entire length of the line needed to interchange at Dongchuan Road station.

On 30 December 2018, the extension from Dongchuan Road station to Fengxian Xincheng station opened, becoming the first Shanghai Metro line to provide access to Fengxian District. The extension crosses the Huangpu River using the Minpu Second Bridge, the first Shanghai Metro line which crosses the river by bridge. The total length of the extension is 19.505 kilometres (12.120 mi) in length, with 7.74 kilometres (4.81 mi) underground and the remainder being elevated. As a result of the extension, the segment of line 5 between Dongchuan Road and Minhang Development Zone stations was designated as a branch service, while the main service ran from Xinzhuang to Fengxian Xincheng stations. The branch line was operated as a separate service from the main line, thus still necessitating a transfer at Dongchuan Road station. This was due to the fact that four-car trains ran on the branch service, while six-car trains ran on the main line. This arrangement ended on 26 December 2020, now service on the branch line continues straight through to Xinzhuang With four-car trains from the branch line and six-car trains from the mainline running in mixed operation in the joint section between Xinzhuang and Dongchuan Road stations. Additionally, the fare system of the line reverted to a pricing similar to other Shanghai Metro Lines.

Shanghai Metro Line 5 opening history
Segment	Commencement	Opened	Length	Station(s)	Name	Investment
Xinzhuang — Minhang Development Zone	28 Feb 1999	25 Nov 2003	16.61 km (10.32 mi)	11	Initial phase	¥3.437 billion
Dongchuan Road — Fengxian Xincheng	30 Jun 2014	30 Dec 2018	16.1 km (10.00 mi)	8	Southern extension (phase two)	¥10.619 billion

=== Controversy ===
During the trial operation of the southern extension section Shanghai Metro received complaints from residents of Pujiang Building on noise. In order to effectively control the impact of the noise caused by the train operation, on the premise of not affecting the overall capacity of line 5, a speed limit of 20 km/h (12 mph) was implemented between Dongchuan Road Station and Xidu Station.

== Stations ==
=== Service routes ===
Shanghai Metro Line 5 service routes
M - Mainline: Xinzhuang ↔ Fengxian Xincheng; B - Branch line: Xinzhuang ↔ Minhang Development Zone
Routes		Station name		Connections	Distance			Location	Open- ing	Plat- form
M	P	English	Chinese	Connections	km		min	Location	Open- ing	Plat- form
Mainline
●	●	Xinzhuang	莘庄	1 Jinshan XZH (Note: Xinzhuang station on the Jinshan line is currently under reconstruction. Expected reopening: 2024.)	0.00	0.00	0	Minhang	25 Nov 2003	At-grade Side
●	●	Chunshen Road	春申路		1.58	1.58	3	Minhang	25 Nov 2003	Elevated Side
●	●	Yindu Road	银都路		1.08	2.66	5	Minhang	25 Nov 2003	Elevated Side
●	●	Zhuanqiao	颛桥		2.70	5.36	9	Minhang	25 Nov 2003	Elevated Side
●	●	Beiqiao	北桥		2.55	7.91	12	Minhang	25 Nov 2003	Elevated Side
●	●	Jianchuan Road	剑川路		2.17	10.08	16	Minhang	25 Nov 2003	Elevated Side
●	●	Dongchuan Road	东川路		0.97	11.05	18	Minhang	25 Nov 2003	Elevated Double Island
Branchline
｜	●	Jinping Road	金平路		1.47	12.52	20	Minhang	25 Nov 2003	Elevated Side
｜	●	Huaning Road	华宁路		1.48	14.00	23	Minhang	25 Nov 2003	Elevated Side
｜	●	Wenjing Road	文井路		1.45	15.45	25	Minhang	25 Nov 2003	Elevated Side
｜	●	Minhang Development Zone	闵行开发区		1.10	16.55	28	Minhang	25 Nov 2003	Elevated Side
Mainline
●		Jiangchuan Road	江川路		1.50	18.05	22	Minhang	30 Dec 2018	Elevated Side
●		Xidu	西渡		2.04	20.09	28	Fengxian	30 Dec 2018	Elevated Side
●		Xiaotang	萧塘		2.69	22.78	32	Fengxian	30 Dec 2018	Elevated Side
●		Fengpu Avenue	奉浦大道		2.99	25.77	35	Fengxian	30 Dec 2018	Elevated Island
●		Huanchengdong Road	环城东路		2.28	28.05	38	Fengxian	30 Dec 2018	Underground Island
●		Wangyuan Road	望园路		1.85	29.90	41	Fengxian	30 Dec 2018	Underground Island
●		Jinhai Lake	金海湖		1.35	31.25	43	Fengxian	30 Dec 2018	Underground Island
●		Fengxian Xincheng	奉贤新城		1.48	32.73	45	Fengxian	30 Dec 2018	Underground Island
		Pingzhuang Highway (Note: Pingzhuang Highway is a reserved station, it didn't open with the rest of the southern extension.)	平庄公路		3.06	35.79

=== Future expansion ===
There is currently a reserved and unopened station on the phase two extension of the line, which would be named Pingzhuang Highway station, located south of the current terminus at Fengxian Xincheng station. A further expansion of the second phase may see the line extended further south via Nanqiao town, Zhelin town to Haiwan town.

The branch line between Dongchuan Road and Minhang Development Zone stations is expected to be replaced by Line 23, entirely underground, running to Shanghai Indoor Stadium station. Line 23 is expected to extend west from Minhang Development Zone to Chedun on the Jinshan line.

A north extension was planned to Hongqiao Railway Station. Plans have been abandoned as this extension is now part of the under construction Jiamin line.

== Headways ==
Shanghai Metro Line 5 headway
Time		Xinzhuang - Dongchuan Road	Dongchuan Road - Fengxian Xincheng	Dongchuan Road - Minhang Development Zone
Monday-Friday (Working days)
AM peak	7:00-9:30	About 2 min and 30 sec	About 3 min and 45 sec	About 7 min and 30 sec
Off-peak	9:30-17:00	About 4 min and 30 sec	About 9 min	About 9 min
PM peak	17:00-20:00	About 3 min	About 4 min and 30 sec	About 9 min
Other hours	Before 7:00 After 20:00	About 7 min and 30 sec - 10 min
Saturday-Sunday (Weekends)
Peak	7:00-20:00	About 4 min	About 8 min	About 8 min
Other hours	Before 7:00 After 20:00	About 7 min and 30 sec - 10 min

== Technology ==
=== Signaling ===
Between 2014 and 2018 the signalling system of line 5 has been updated from the Siemens ZUB 200 to Thales SEC Transport TSTCBTC®2.0 (also deployed on Line 14). It is a unique dual CBTC system that features full redundancy and allows higher level of availability. This is China's first metro line that was deployed with a dual CBTC system.

The line 5 is China's first metro line where operation, renovation and construction were fulfilled at the same time. The project consisted of resignaling and expanding platforms of the existing section and adding a new south extension. To ensure no interruption to normal service, all the resignalling and commissioning was conducted in only a few hours during the night. Both before and after the commissioning, a switchover was made between the old and the new signaling system to ensure normal operation on the next day. After over 500 days, and more than 1,000 switchovers, line 5 had a seamless cutover to the new signalling system with no interruption to normal service at the end of 2018.

=== Rolling Stock ===
In 2017, Alstom has modernised 68 metro cars (05C01) in service on the Shanghai metro line 5 and to supplied traction and train control management systems for 198 new metro cars due to circulate on the existing line and its extension for 46 million euros. Alstom had modernised the 68 metro cars that it supplied in 2003 with its Chinese joint venture SATCO (Shanghai Alstom Transport Co. Ltd.). The modernisation will increase the reliability of the cars and adapt them to a new signalling system that will be implemented on the line. Alstom supplied traction systems for 198 new cars that have been ordered for the line and its extension. All traction drives were manufactured by Alstom's joint venture SATEE (Shanghai Alstom Transport Electrical Equipment Co. Ltd.).

The designed speed of the train is 80 km/h, the length (Class A carriages are longer at 23 meters) is 19.49 meters (Tc)/19.44 meters (Mp, M), and the width (Class A carriages are wider at 3.0 meters) is 2.6 meters. It is a VVVF AC drive and has a design life of 30 years. 05C01 stocks has 4 carriages with 172 seats which could accommodate 1170 people (compared to a six carriage Class A car which can accommodate 1860 people which is 60% higher than a four carriage Class C car). Despite using Class C cars, there are no reports of overcrowding on Line 5 due to the low ridership.

Shanghai Metro Line 5 rolling stock
Fleet numbers	Manufacturer	Time of manufac- turing	Class	No of car	Assembly (Note: Tc: Trailer with cab; Mp: EMU with pantograph; M: EMU without pantograph.)	Rolling stock	Number	Notes
68	SATCO (Note: SATCO (Shanghai Alstom Transportation Equipment Co., Ltd.) is a joint venture between Alstom Metropolis and Shanghai Electric.)	2002-2004	C (Note: Class C carriage: 19.44m in length, 2.6m in width and 3.8m in height; Capacity: about 200 people.)	4	Tc+Mp+Mp+Tc	05C01	501-513 and 515-518 (02011-02041, 03011-03401 and 04011-04241.)	Original name: AC11. Used on the branchline. Only sets without gangway connection between the carriages.
198	CRRC Changchun Railway Vehicles Co., Ltd.	2017-2019	C	6	Tc+Mp+M+M+Mp+Tc	05C02	0519-0551 (050691-052661)	Used on the mainline.

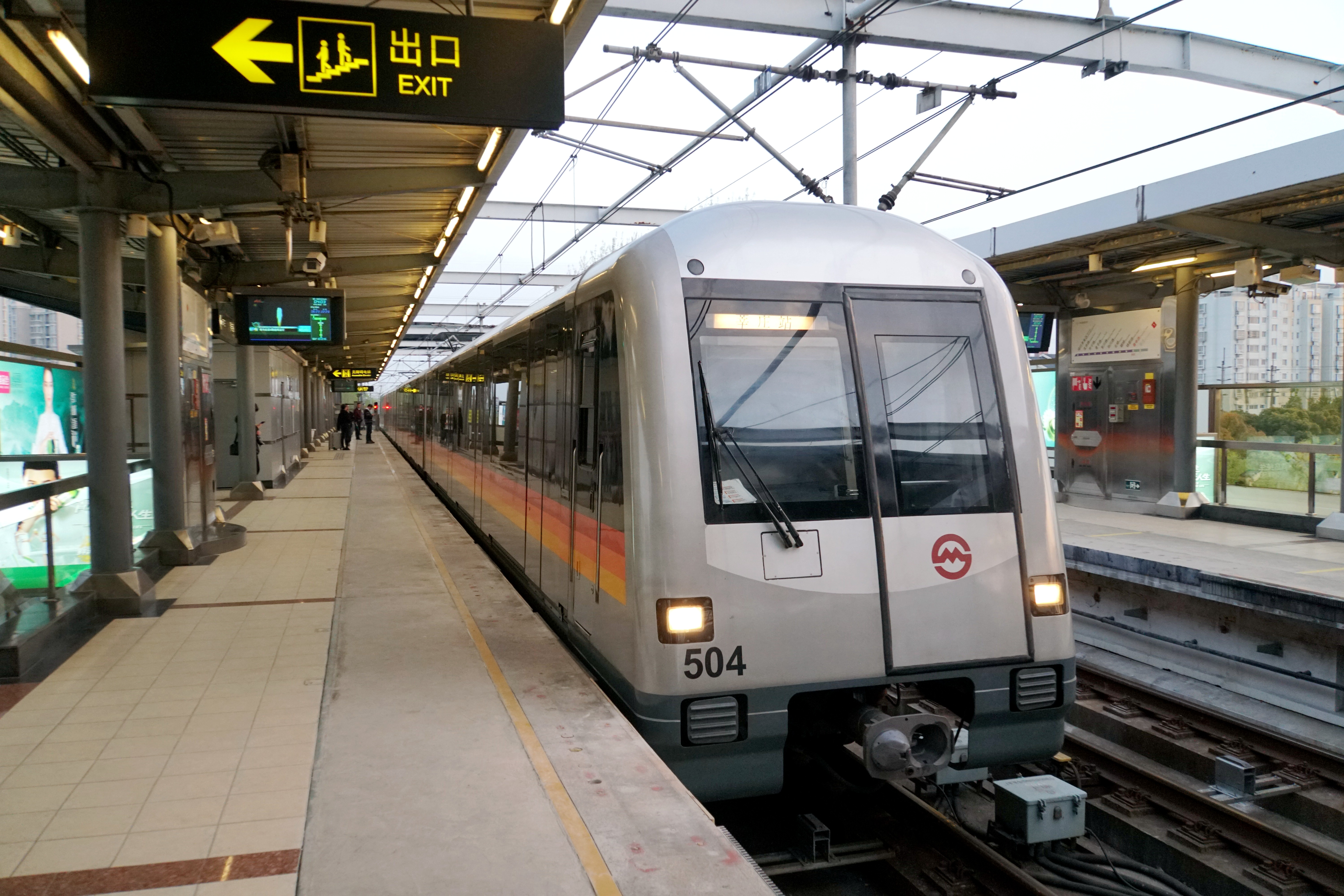
05C01 train

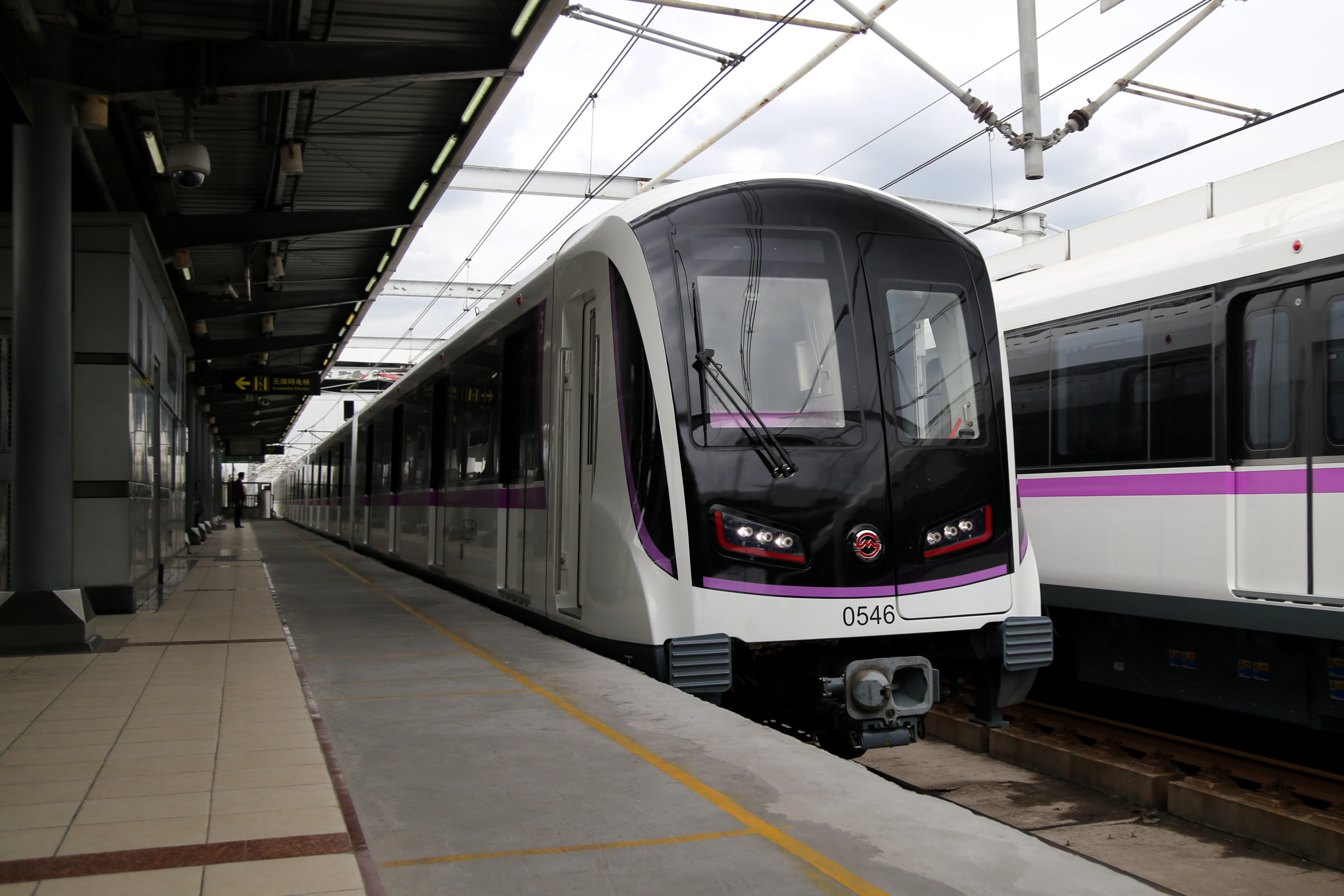
05C02 train
