= Minhang, Shanghai =

Minhang 闵行区; 閔行區
- District
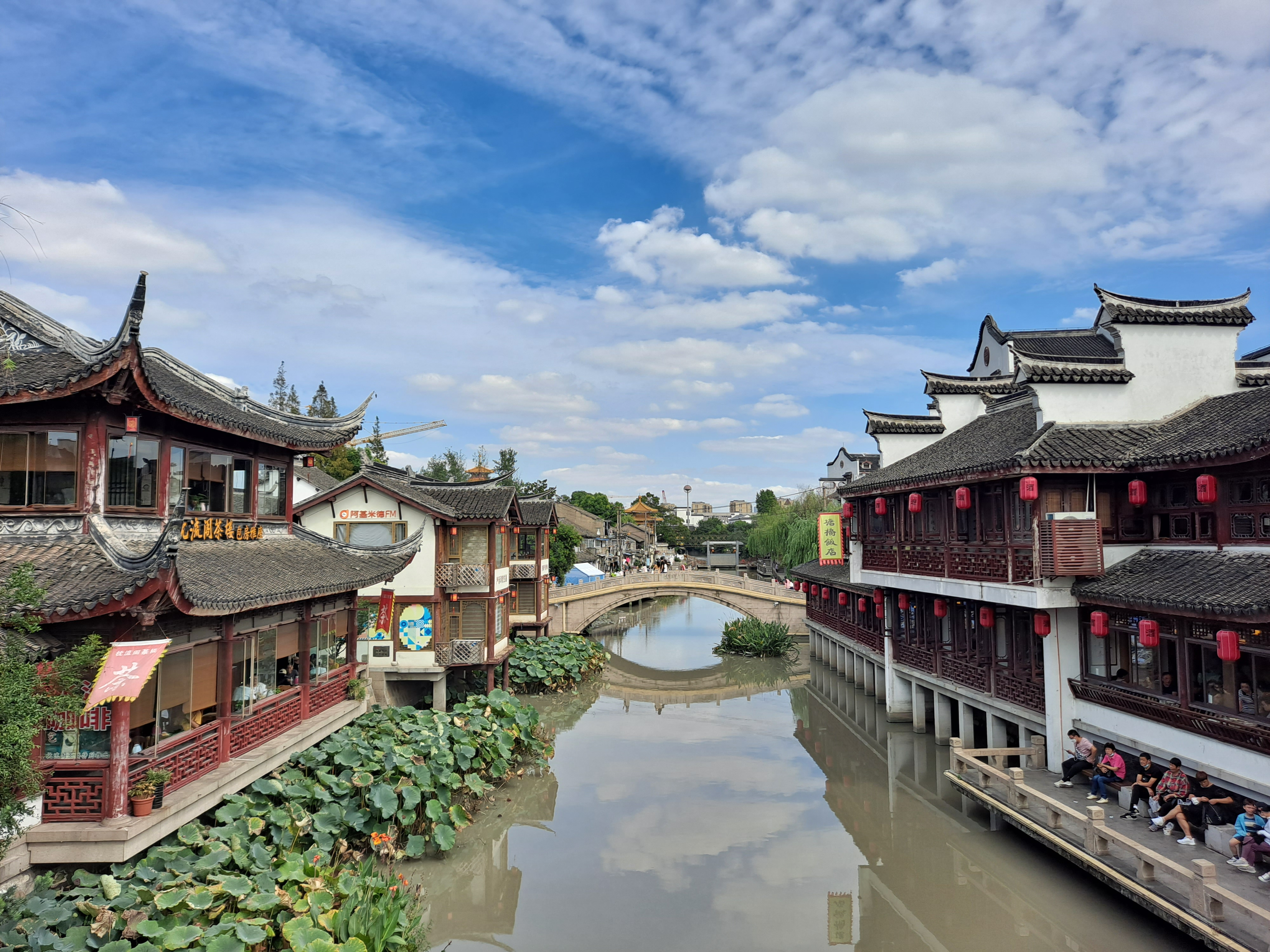
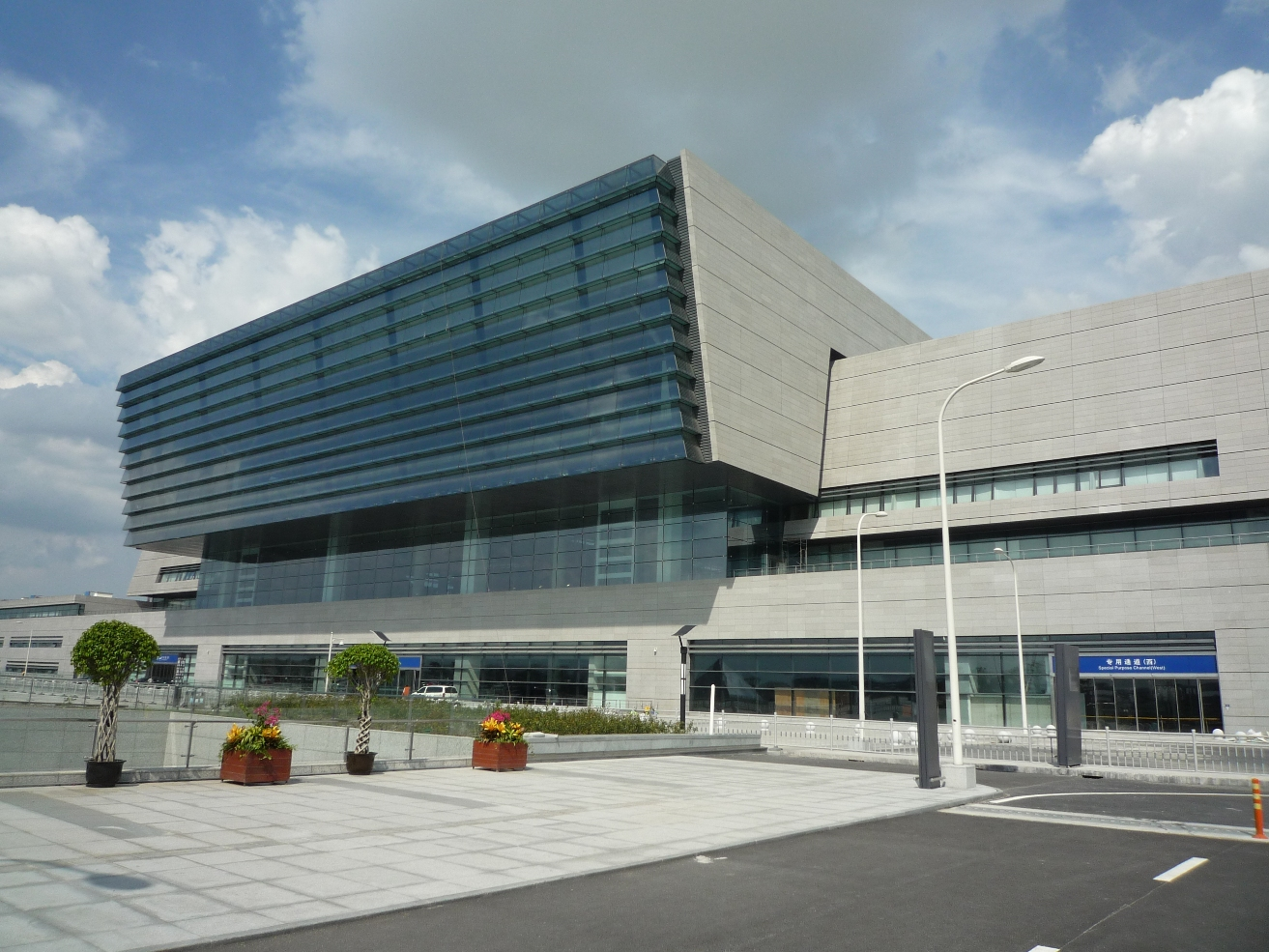
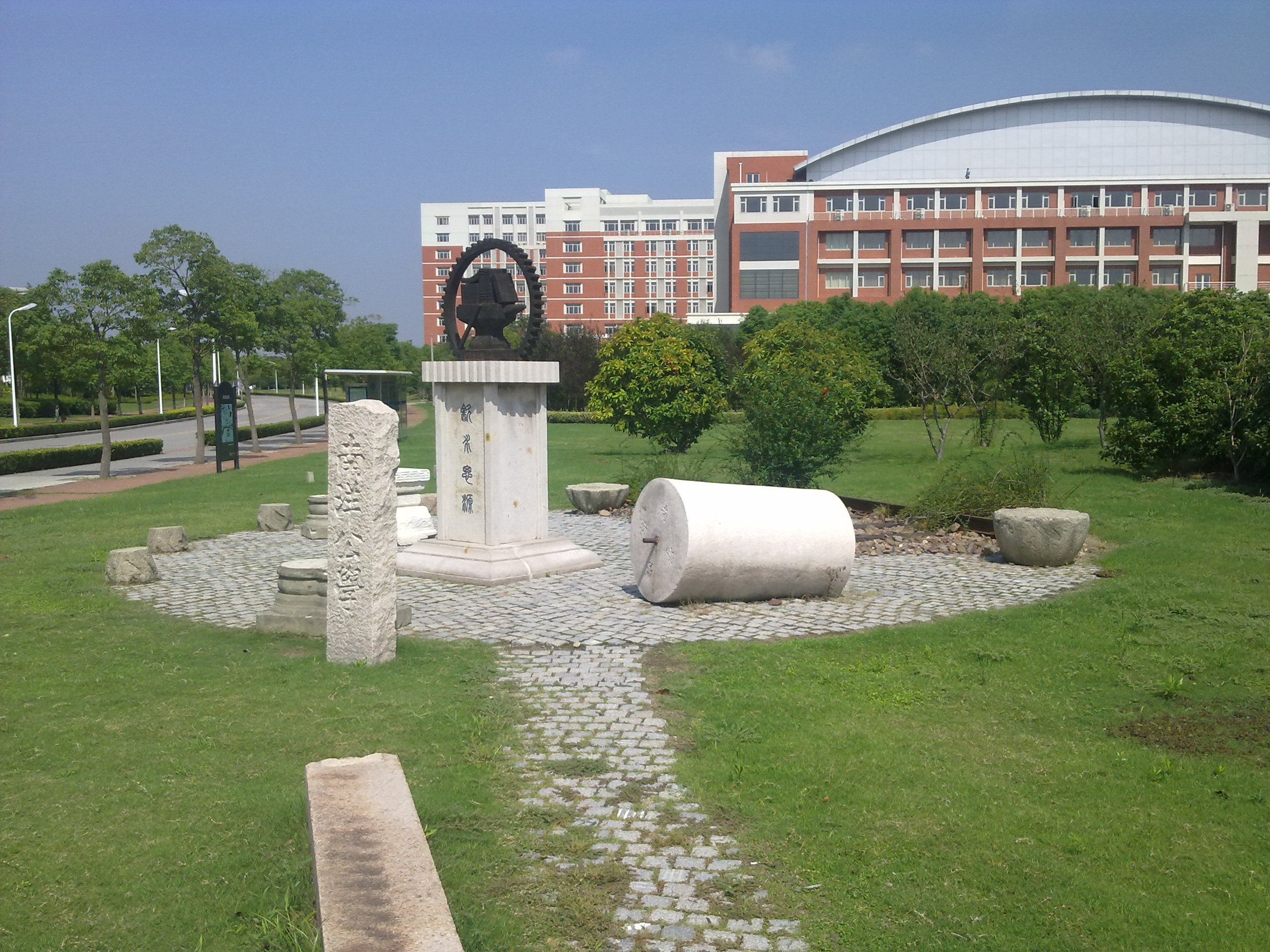
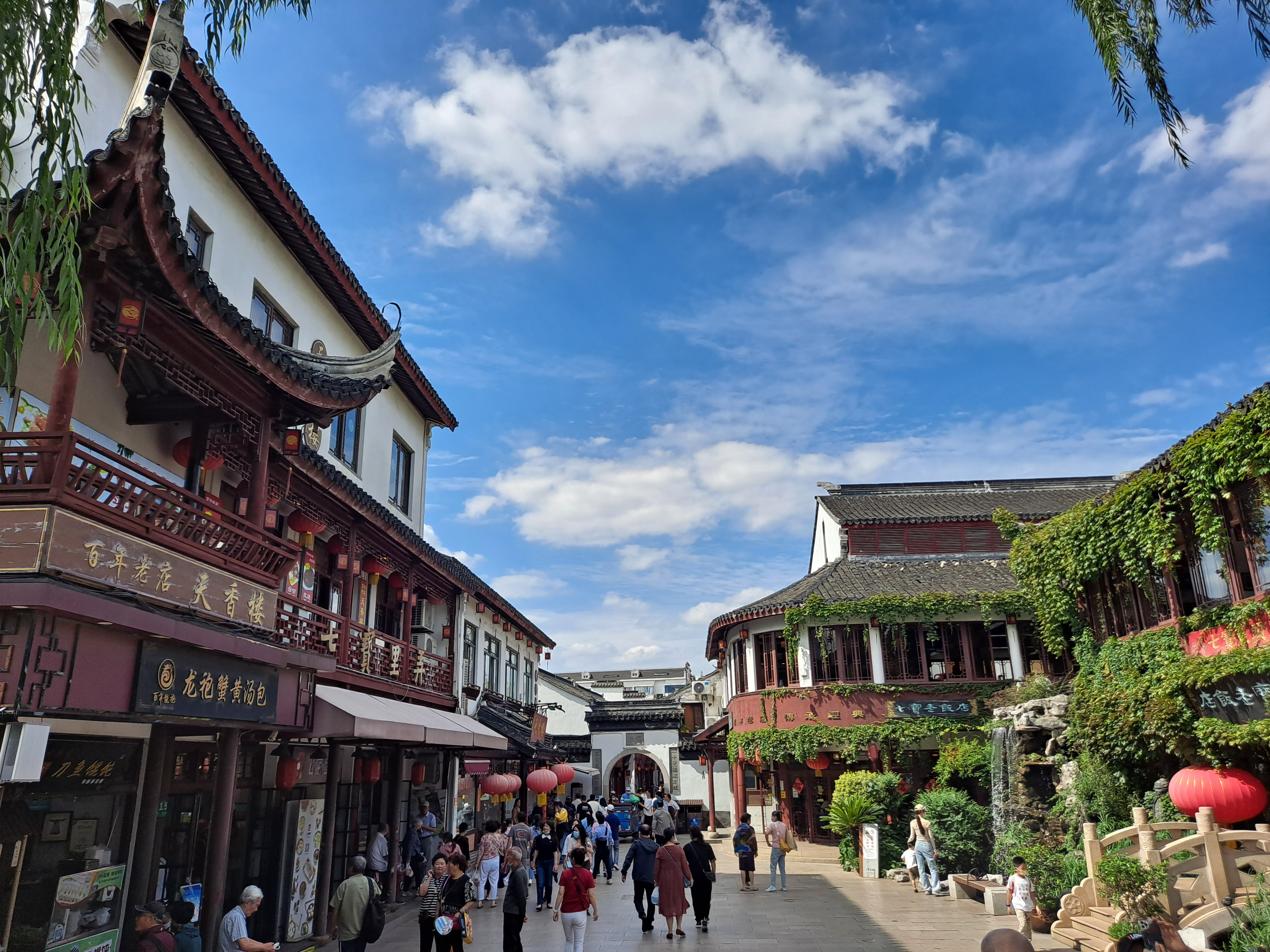
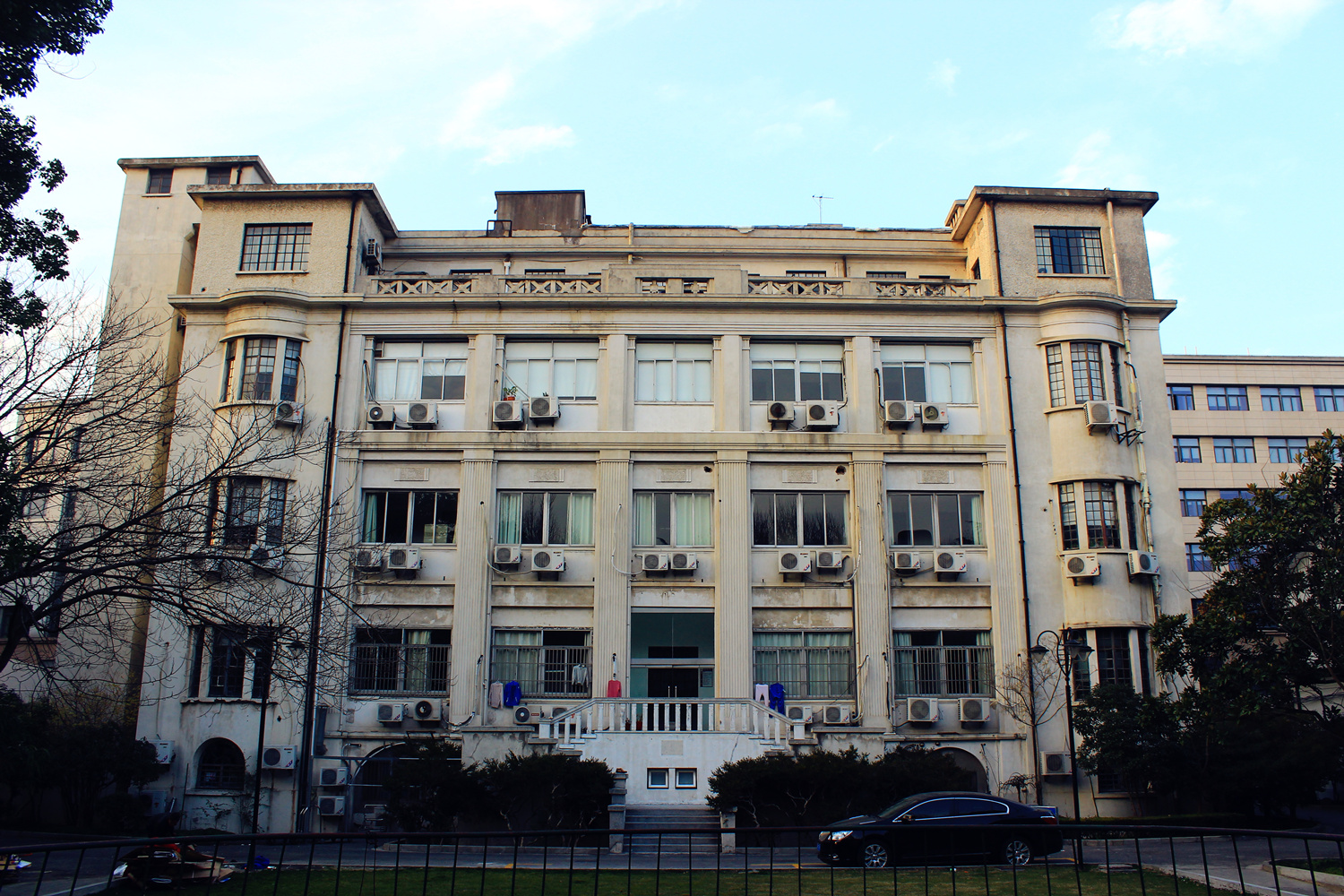
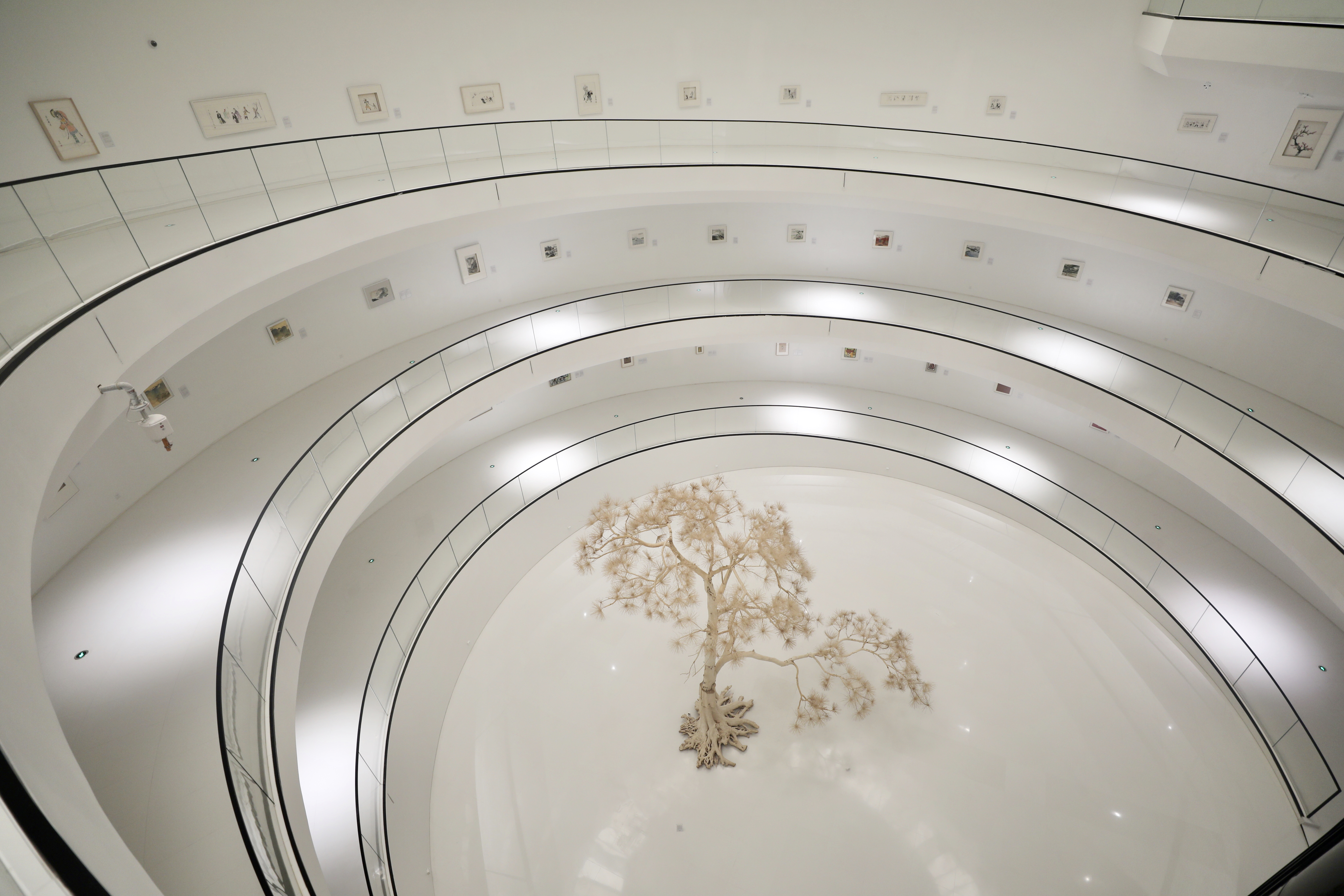
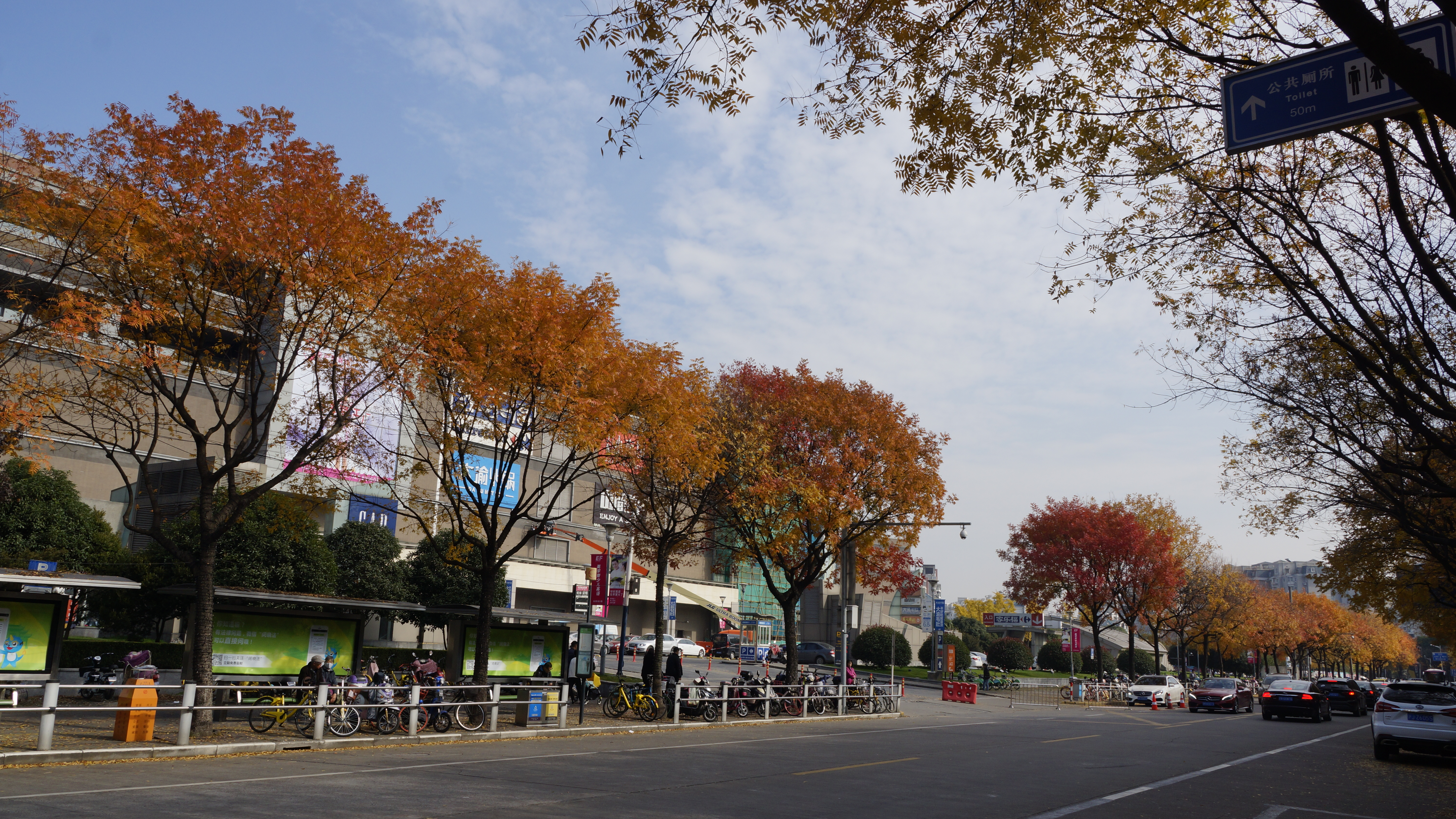
- Qibao Old Town along Puhui River Shanghai Hongqiao Railway Station Jiaotong University Campus Qibao Old Street Eye and ENT Hospital of Fudan University Powerlong Art Museum Mingdu Road and Sky Mall at Xinzhuang
- Motto: The Charming Green Community
- Location in Shanghai
- Interactive map of Minhang
- Coordinates: 31°06′46″N 121°22′54″E
- Country: People's Republic of China
- Municipality: Shanghai

Area
  - Total: 371.7 km^{2} (143.5 sq mi)

Population (2020)
  - Total: 2,653,489
  - Density: 7,139/km^{2} (18,490/sq mi)
- Time zone: UTC+8 (China Standard)
- Area code: 021
- Website: www.shmh.gov.cn

Minhang, Shanghai
- Simplified Chinese: 闵行区
- Traditional Chinese: 閔行區
- Wugniu: min^{4} ghaon^{2} chiu^{1}
- Postal: Minhong
Transcriptions
Standard Mandarin
- Hanyu Pinyin: Mǐnháng Qū
Wu
- Wugniu: min^{4} ghaon^{2} chiu^{1}
- IPA: Shanghainese: [min˩ ɦɑ̃˦ tɕʰy˩]
Yue: Cantonese
- Jyutping: man^{5} hong^{4} keoi^{1}

The Logo of Minhang District

Minhang District is a suburban district of Shanghai with a land area of 371.57 km^{2} (143.46 sq mi) and population of 2,653,489 residents as of 2020. The original Minhang consist of present-day Jiangchuan Road Subdistrict (Former Minhang Town) and the eastern strip of Wujing along the Huangpu River in 1992, the surrounding Shanghai County merged with Minhang.

It is mostly a residential district, though it is also home to some of the many factories and production facilities in Shanghai. Residential housing development is the main source of local government revenue. Qizhong Forest Sports City Arena (旗忠森林体育城) is located in Maqiao Town (马桥镇). The Aerospace Museum is being constructed at Pujiang Town.

Shanghai Jiao Tong University and East China Normal University both have campuses in the southern part of Minhang District.

== Administrative divisions ==
Minhang administers 4 subdistricts and 9 towns.

Of particular note is Qibao (七宝), a tourist attraction in the northern part of the district, and Maqiao, which hosted the Shanghai ATP Masters tennis tournament and is the site of the Neolithic Ruins of Maqiao. The town of Hongqiao also overlaps with Hongqiao Subdistrict in Changning District, and is next to the location of Shanghai Hongqiao International Airport, the city's older commercial airport and which is used primarily for domestic flights.

Name	Chinese (S)	Hanyu Pinyin	Shanghainese Romanization	Population (2010)	Area (km^{2})
Jiangchuan Road Subdistrict	江川路街道	Jiāngchuān lù Jiēdào	kaon tseu lu ka do	185,991	30.27
Gumei Road Subdistrict	古美路街道	Gǔměi lù Jiēdào	ku mhe lu ka do	149,141	6.51
Xinhong Subdistrict	新虹街道	Xīnhóng Jiēdào	sin ron ka do	65,256	19.26
Pujing Subdistrict	浦锦街道	Pǔjǐn Jiēdào	phu cin ka do	292,750	23.99
Pujiang town	浦江镇	Pǔjiāng Zhèn	phu kaon tzen	292,750	78.51
Xinzhuang town	莘庄镇	Xīnzhuāng Zhèn	sen tzaon tzen	277,934	19.12
Qibao town	七宝镇	Qībǎo Zhèn	tsiq po tzen	283,352	18.10
Zhuanqiao town	颛桥镇	Zhuānqiáo Zhèn	tzeu djio tzen	189,604	20.97
Huacao town	华漕镇	Huácáo Zhèn	rau dzo tzen	193,777	46.28
Hongqiao town	虹桥镇	hóngqiáo Zhèn	ron djio tzen	165,877	8.98
Meilong town	梅陇镇	Méilǒng Zhèn	me lon tzen	344,434	25.71
Wujing town	吴泾镇	Wújīng Zhèn	wu cin tzen	121,164	37.64
Maqiao town	马桥镇	Mǎqiáo Zhèn	mau djio tzen	103,989	33.20
Xinzhuang Industrial Zone	莘庄工业区	Xīnzhuāng Gōngyèqū	sen tzaon kon gniq chiu	56,103	17.88

== Economy ==
The hotel chain Huazhu Hotels Group is headquartered in Minhang District. The fast food chain Yonghe King has its headquarters in Minhang District. Want Want China, the milk manufacturer, has its headquarters in the district.

== Education ==
Experimental schools:

- Shanghai Minhang High School

International schools include:

- British International School Puxi Campus
- Nord Anglia Chinese International School
- Shanghai American School Puxi Campus
- Shanghai Japanese School Hongqiao Campus (elementary school)
- Shanghai Korean School
- Shanghai Singapore International School Minhang Campus
- Dulwich College Shanghai Puxi Campus

Closed:

- Shanghai Rego International School

== Transportation ==
- Public bicycle share scheme, with more than 20,000 bikes available for free use, after a registration process.
- Luheng Road Comprehensive Passenger Transport Hub Project Luheng Road Comprehensive Passenger Transport Hub, located at Puxing Road NO. 569 Minhang District, is taking up a land of 27,612 square meters and connected to Metro Line 8 at Luheng Road Stop. It is one of the two Park and Ride testing Transportation Hubs in Shanghai, boasting departure and terminal stops of 6 bus lines connecting to downtown Shanghai and 500 parking spaces. Commuters can save the expensive parking fee in the downtown area and park their cars here and transfer to the Metro or bus lines for work. The project was started in 2011 and the hub has been put into use in 2016.

=== Metro ===
Minhang is currently served by six metro lines operated by Shanghai Metro:

- Line 1 - Xinzhuang Station 5 , Waihuanlu, Lianhua Road
- Line 2 - Hongqiao Railway Station 10 17 , Hongqiao Airport Terminal 2 10
- Line 5 - Xinzhuang Station 1 , Chunshen Road, Yindu Road, Zhuanqiao, Beiqiao, Jianchuan Road, Dongchuan Road, Jinping Road, Huaning Road, Wenjing Road, Minhang Development Zone
- Line 8 - Luheng Road, Pujiang Town, Jiangyue Road, Lianhang Road, Shendu Highway
- Line 9 - Zhongchun Road, Qibao, Xingzhong Road, Hechuan Road
- Line 10 - Hangzhong Road, Ziteng Road, Longbai Xincun / Hongqiao Railway Station 2 17 , Hongqiao Airport Terminal 2 2 (Hongqiao Airport Terminal 1 is in Changning District)
- Line 17 - Hongqiao Railway Station 2 10
- Pujiang Line - Shendu Highway 8 , Sanlu Highway, Minrui Road, Puhang Road, Dongchengyi Road, Huizhen Road

== Gallery ==
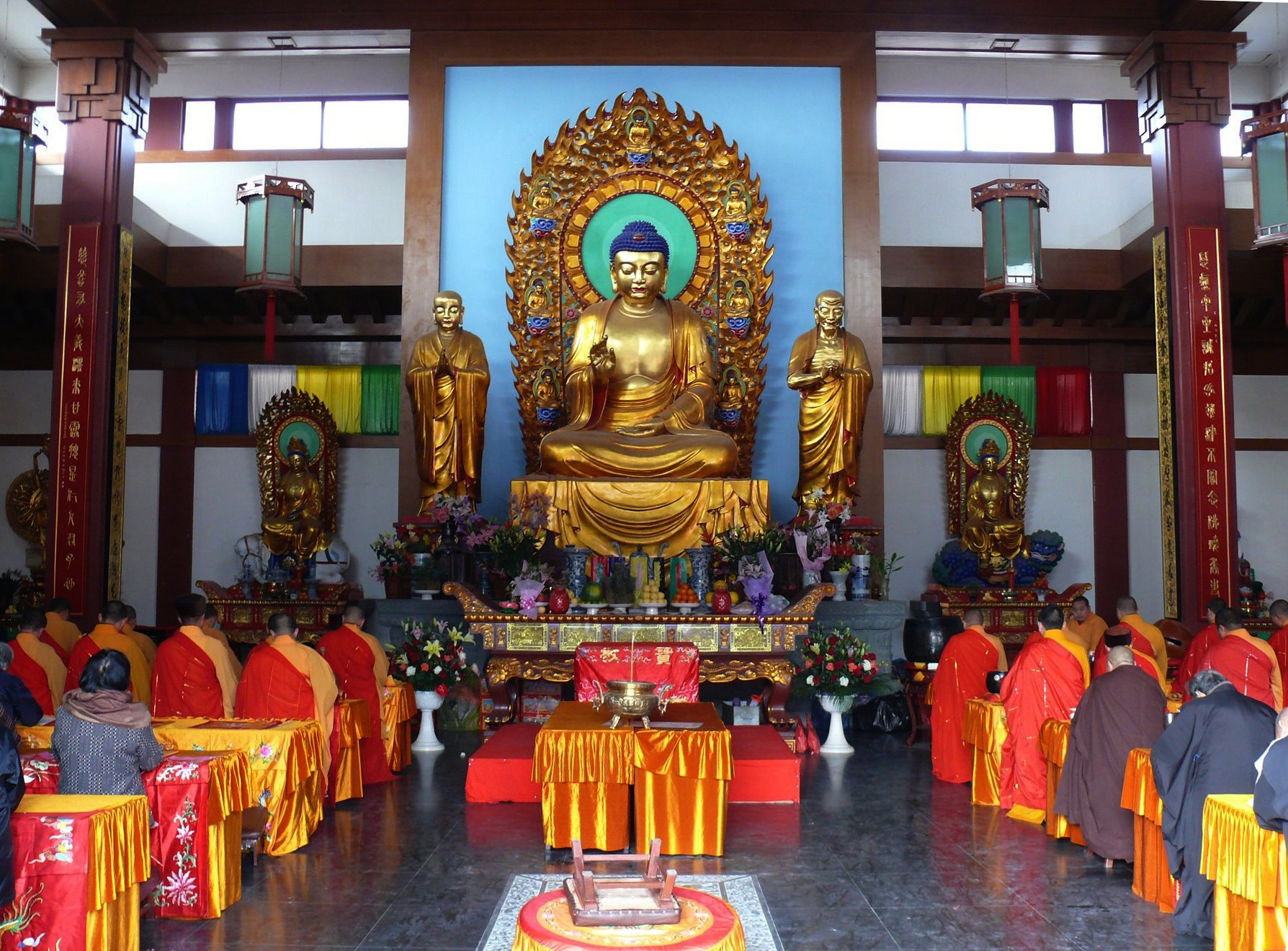
Buddhist Temple at Qibao

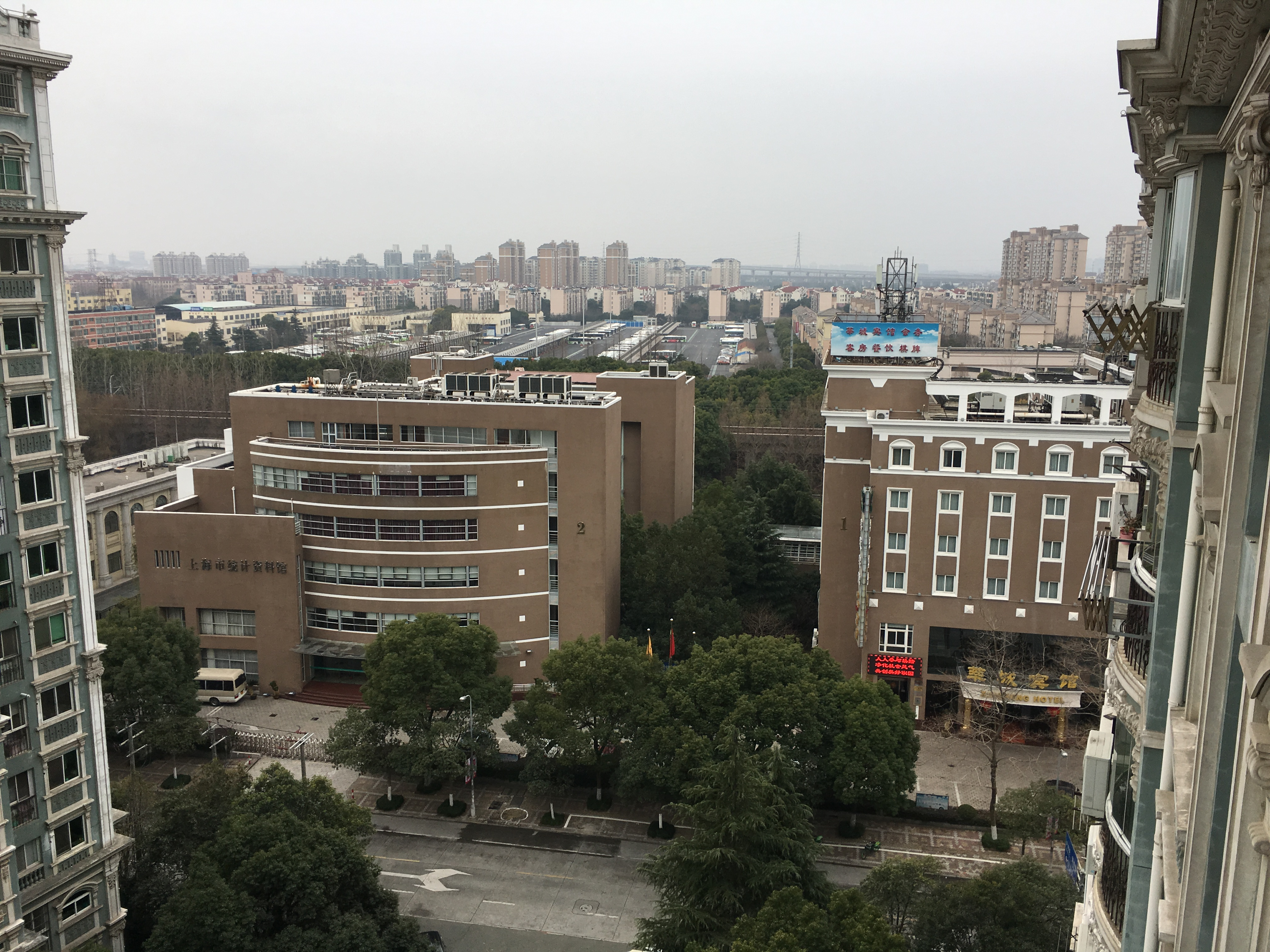
Residential area in Minhang

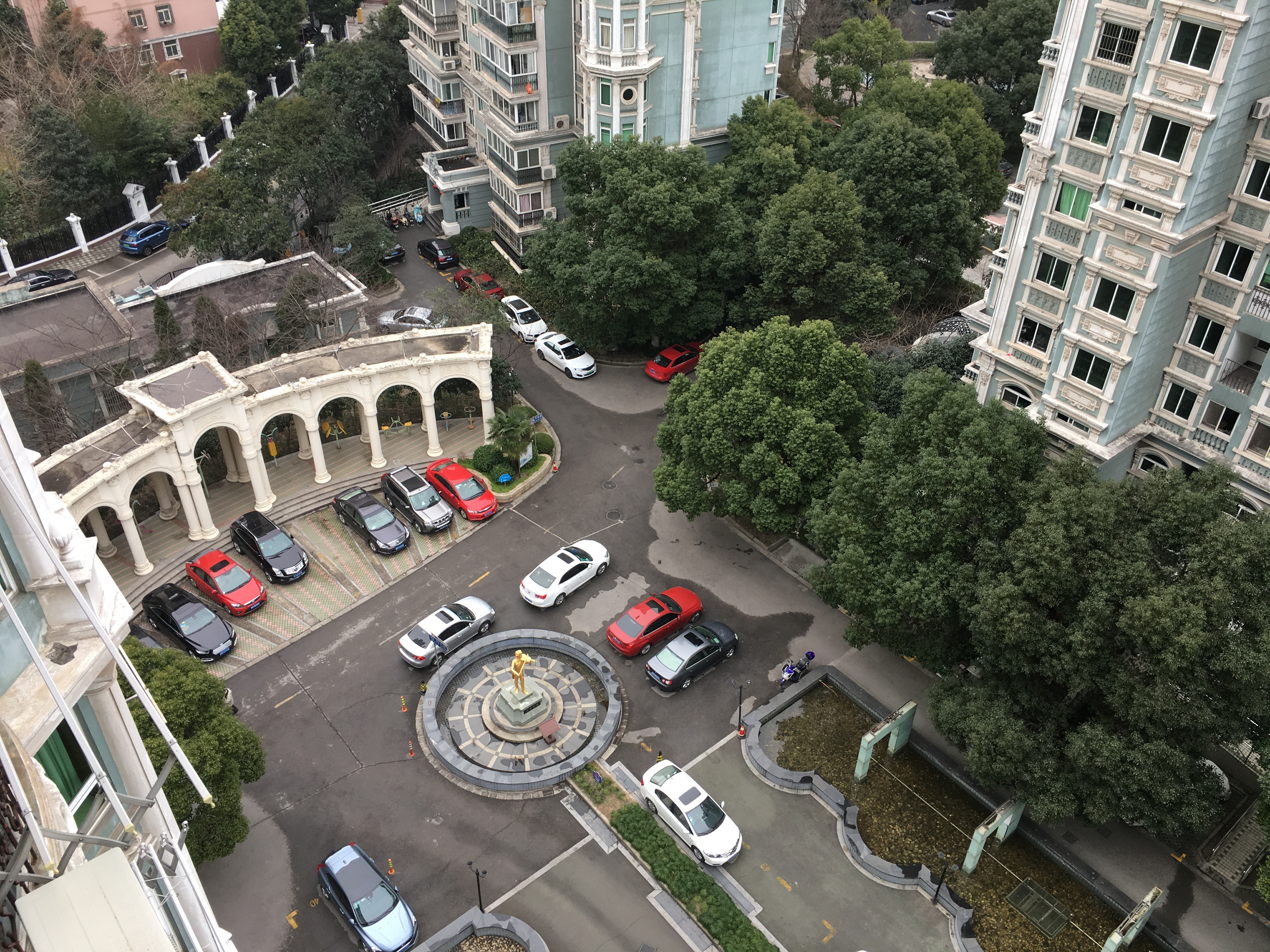
Residential compound on Zhucheng Road

== Climate ==
Minhang has a humid subtropical climate (Köppen climate classification Cfa). The average annual temperature in Minhang is 16.5 °C (61.7 °F). The average annual rainfall is 1,180.7 mm (46.48 in) with July as the wettest month. The temperatures are highest on average in July, at around 28.8 °C (83.8 °F), and lowest in January, at around 4.9 °C (40.8 °F).

Climate data for Minhang District, elevation 6 m (20 ft), (1991–2020 normals, extremes 1951–present)
Month	Jan	Feb	Mar	Apr	May	Jun	Jul	Aug	Sep	Oct	Nov	Dec	Year
Record high °C (°F)	24.0 (75.2)	27.2 (81.0)	31.5 (88.7)	33.3 (91.9)	37.5 (99.5)	37.3 (99.1)	40.8 (105.4)	40.9 (105.6)	37.4 (99.3)	35.7 (96.3)	29.7 (85.5)	23.9 (75.0)	40.9 (105.6)
Mean daily maximum °C (°F)	8.7 (47.7)	10.7 (51.3)	14.8 (58.6)	20.6 (69.1)	25.5 (77.9)	28.3 (82.9)	32.8 (91.0)	32.3 (90.1)	28.5 (83.3)	23.6 (74.5)	17.9 (64.2)	11.5 (52.7)	21.3 (70.3)
Daily mean °C (°F)	4.9 (40.8)	6.6 (43.9)	10.4 (50.7)	15.8 (60.4)	20.9 (69.6)	24.4 (75.9)	28.8 (83.8)	28.5 (83.3)	24.7 (76.5)	19.5 (67.1)	13.7 (56.7)	7.3 (45.1)	17.1 (62.8)
Mean daily minimum °C (°F)	1.9 (35.4)	3.3 (37.9)	6.8 (44.2)	11.9 (53.4)	17.2 (63.0)	21.5 (70.7)	25.8 (78.4)	25.7 (78.3)	21.6 (70.9)	15.9 (60.6)	10.1 (50.2)	3.9 (39.0)	13.8 (56.8)
Record low °C (°F)	−11.0 (12.2)	−8.5 (16.7)	−5.2 (22.6)	−0.6 (30.9)	6.0 (42.8)	12.4 (54.3)	16.6 (61.9)	18.5 (65.3)	10.3 (50.5)	2.3 (36.1)	−4.7 (23.5)	−8.8 (16.2)	−11.0 (12.2)
Average precipitation mm (inches)	70.4 (2.77)	65.4 (2.57)	95.4 (3.76)	82.5 (3.25)	93.2 (3.67)	207.3 (8.16)	148.0 (5.83)	187.1 (7.37)	118.1 (4.65)	68.4 (2.69)	59.4 (2.34)	50.3 (1.98)	1,245.5 (49.04)
Average precipitation days (≥ 0.1 mm)	10.9	10.2	12.9	11.3	11.2	14.5	11.7	12.4	9.8	7.4	9.1	8.3	129.7
Average snowy days	1.8	1.4	0.4	0	0	0	0	0	0	0	0.1	0.7	4.4
Average relative humidity (%)	74	73	72	71	73	80	78	78	76	73	74	72	75
Mean monthly sunshine hours	114.8	117.9	143.8	168.1	176.8	131.2	209.4	202.3	163.7	162.1	131.1	129.7	1,850.9
Percentage possible sunshine	36	37	39	43	41	31	49	50	45	46	42	41	42
Source: China Meteorological Administration All-time October high
