= Fengxian Xincheng station =

Metro station in Shanghai, China

Fengxian Xincheng 奉贤新城
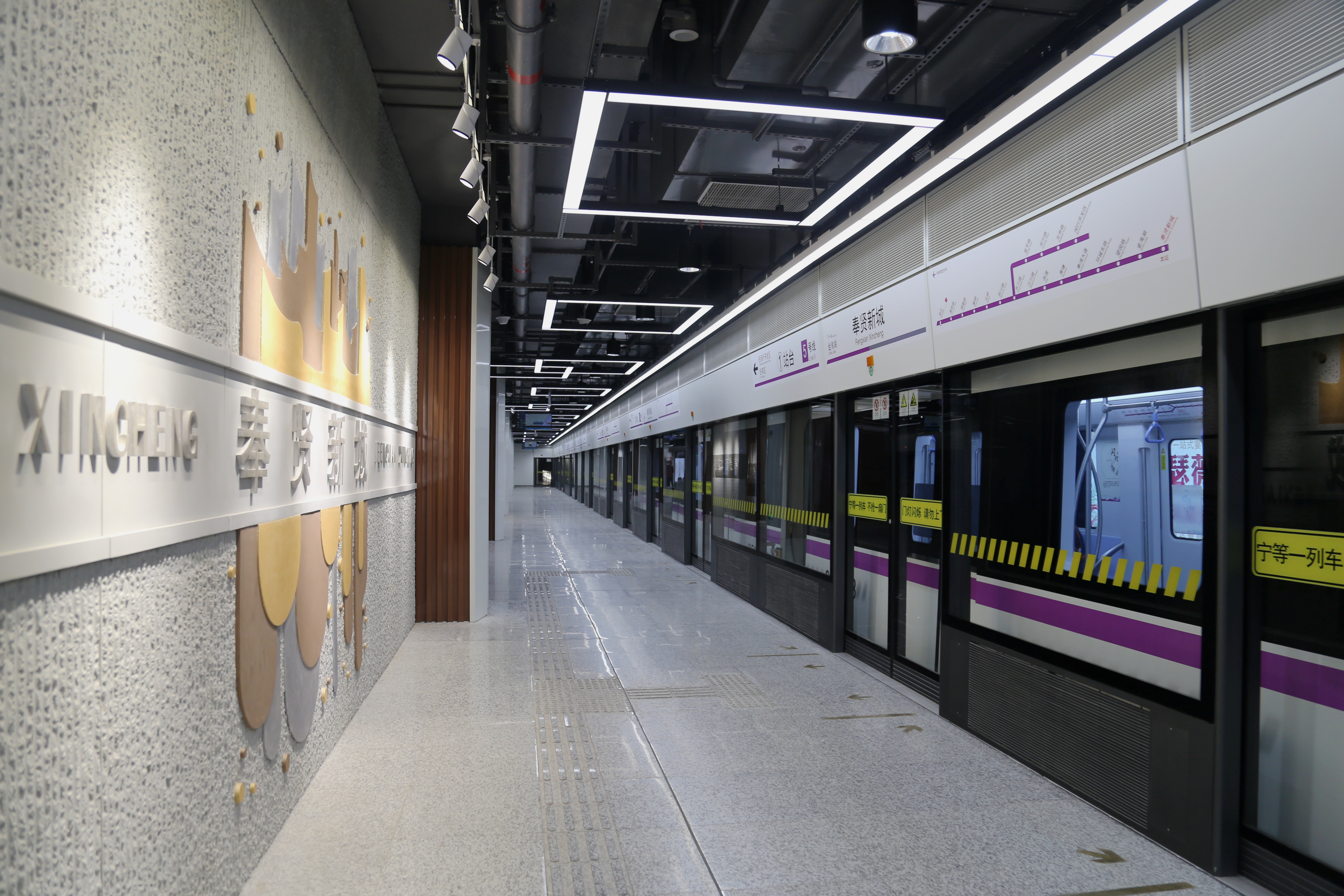
- Station platform

General information
- Other names: Nanqiao Xincheng (former)
- Location: Baixiu Road and Jinhai Highway; Fengxian District, Shanghai; China
- Coordinates: 30.919027°N 121.490876°E
- Operated by: Shanghai No. 1 Metro Operation Co. Ltd.
- Line: Line 5
- Platforms: 2 (1 island platform)
- Tracks: 2

Construction
- Structure type: Underground
- Accessible: Yes

History
- Opened: 30 December 2018

Services
Preceding station	Shanghai Metro	Following station
Jinhai Lake towards Xinzhuang	Line 5	Terminus
Location

Fengxian Xincheng (simplified Chinese: 奉贤新城; traditional Chinese: 奉賢新城; pinyin: Fèngxián Xīnchéng; lit. 'Fengxian New City') is a station on Line 5 of the Shanghai Metro. Located at Baixiu Road and Jinhai Highway in the city's Fengxian District, the station is located on the main branch of Line 5 and opened as part of the southern extension of Line 5 on 30 December 2018. It is an underground station and will serve as the southern terminus of the line until the future opening of Pingzhuang Highway. During the planning and construction stages, this station was known as Nanqiao Xincheng (南桥新城; 南橋新城; Nánqiáo Xīnchéng; 'Nanqiao New City').

To the north, the next station on the line is Jinhai Lake. To the south, the tracks ascend above ground to the Pingzhuang rail yard. A future station named Pingzhuang Highway is reserved between this station and the rail yard.

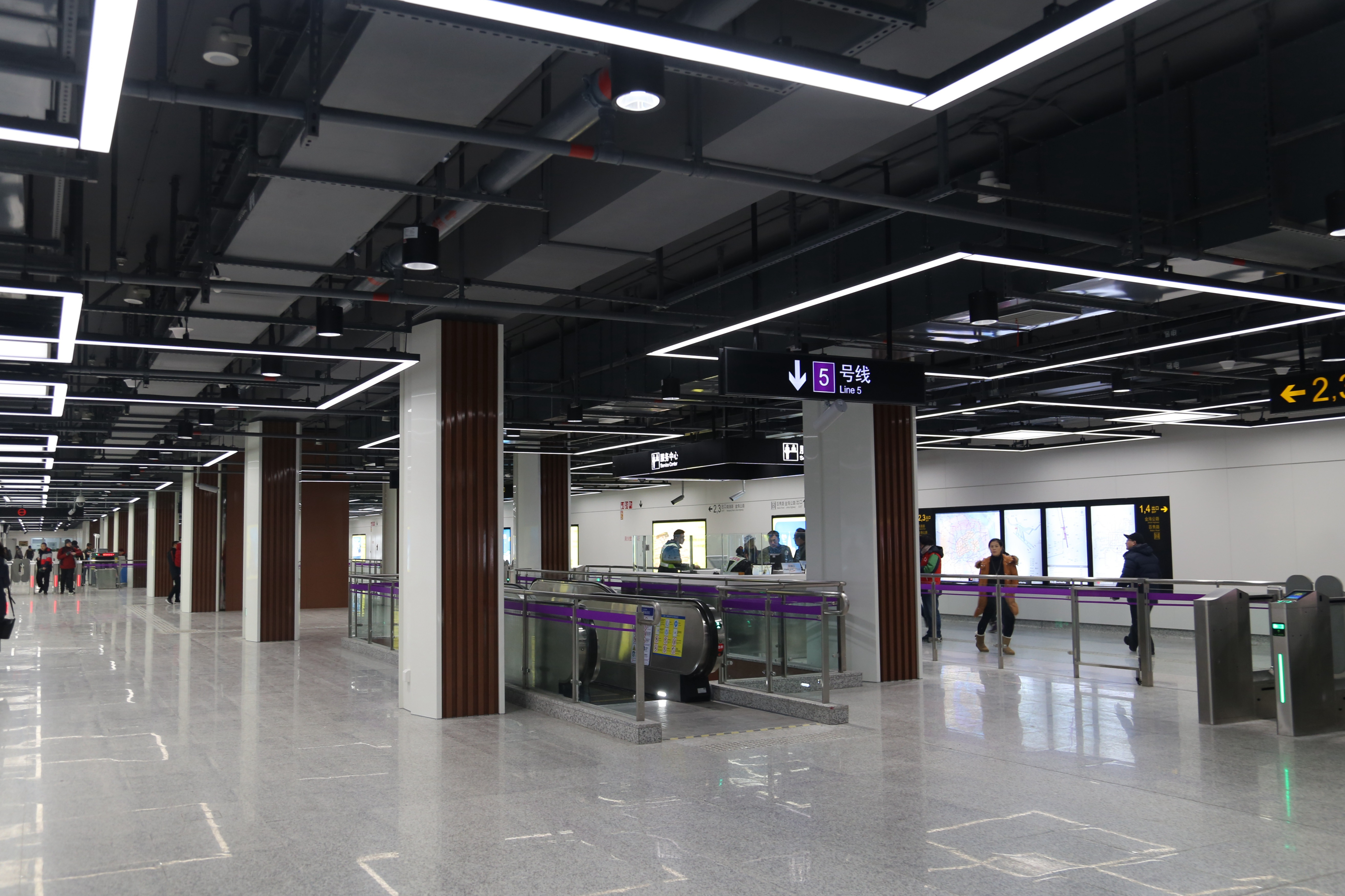
Station concourse
