= Fengxian, Shanghai =

Coordinates: 30°52′59″N 121°34′01″E

Fengxian 奉贤区; 奉賢區 Fengsien
- District
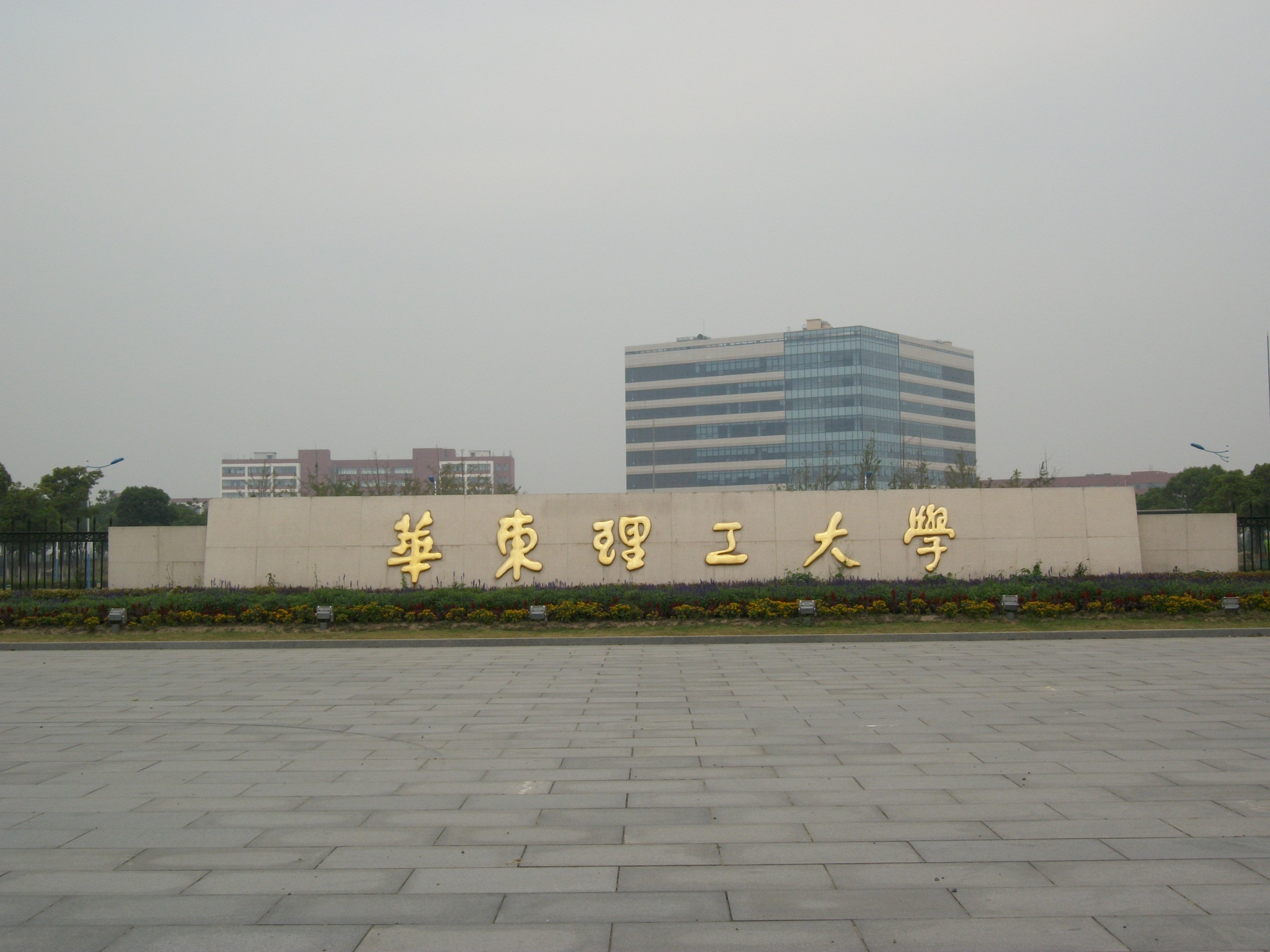
- East China University of Science and Technology Fengxian Campus

- Fengxian in Shanghai
- Interactive map of Fengxian
- Country: People's Republic of China
- Municipality: Shanghai

Area
  - Total: 704.68 km^{2} (272.08 sq mi)

Population (2020 Census)
  - Total: 1,140,872
  - Density: 1,619.0/km^{2} (4,193.2/sq mi)
- Time zone: UTC+8 (China Standard)

Fengxian, Shanghai
- Simplified Chinese: 奉贤区
- Traditional Chinese: 奉賢區
- Wugniu: von^{6} ye^{2} chiu^{1}
- Postal: Fengsien
Transcriptions
Standard Mandarin
- Hanyu Pinyin: Fèngxián Qū
Wu
- Wugniu: von^{6} ye^{2} chiu^{1}
- IPA: Shanghainese: [voŋ˩ ɦi˦ tɕʰy˩]
Yue: Cantonese
- Jyutping: fung^{6} jin^{4} jyun^{6}
- IPA: [fʊŋ˨.jin˩ jyn˨]

Fengxian County
- Simplified Chinese: 奉贤县
- Traditional Chinese: 奉賢縣
- Wugniu: von^{6} ye^{2} yoe^{6}
Transcriptions
Standard Mandarin
- Hanyu Pinyin: Fèngxián Xiàn
- IPA: [fə̂ŋ.ɕjɛ̌n ɕjɛ̂n]
Wu
- Wugniu: von^{6} ye^{2} yoe^{6}
- IPA: Shanghainese: [voŋ˩ ɦi˦ ɦyø˩]
Yue: Cantonese
- Jyutping: fung^{6} jin^{4} jyun^{6}
- IPA: [fʊŋ˨.jin˩ jyn˨]

Fengxian District, is a suburban district in the south of Shanghai with a land area of 704.68 km^{2} (272.08 sq mi), a registered population (as of 2020) of 1,140,872, and 1.5 to 2 times more migrants. It is known for its relative rusticity, as well as its beaches and ocean resorts along the Hangzhou Bay. Bihai Jinsha (Chinese: 碧海金沙; lit. 'Green Sea', 'Golden sand') is a common place for Shanghainese to spend their weekend.

In 2019 some senior citizens in Fengxian District still used the pronunciation "Hongxian".

Metro Line 5 connects Fengxian to central Shanghai.

== Overview ==
Nanqiao is a major town in Fengxian district, which recent development has more than doubled in size. Of particular interest is Guhua Park which contains the "Three Women Temple" or "Ancestral Hall" (三女祠; Sān Nǚ Cí). During the Zhou dynasty, the King of Wu's three daughters hanged themselves rather than be caught by the King of Yue's soldiers. The town is also a short taxi ride from Xinghai Beach and its resorts, also slated for development. Nanqiao has a 1000-bed medical center, the Fengxian District Central Hospital, which is an all-discipline tertiary hospital.

Nanqiao is about 30 minutes from downtown Shanghai by car or about 1–2 hours by public transit. It can be reached by taking the Line 1 subway to Xinzhuang and transferring to the Line 5 subway to Dongchuan Road. Alternatively, one can transfer to the Xinnan Bus at Xinzhuang, the Nanmei Line (南梅线) from Jinjiang Park to Nanqiao Bus Station (南桥汽车站), or the Shangfeng Bus at the Shanghai South Railway Station Station's South Square.

== Towns ==
Name	Chinese (S)	Hanyu Pinyin	Shanghainese Romanization	Population (2010)	Area (km^{2})
Xidu Subdistrict	西渡街道	Xīdù Jiēdào	sij du ka do	361,185	28.77
Nanqiao town	南桥镇	Nánqiáo Zhèn	neu djio tzen	361,185	114.68
Fengcheng town	奉城镇	Fèngchéng Zhèn	von zen tzen	176,938	110.65
Zhuanghang town	庄行镇	Zhuāngháng Zhèn	tzaon raon tzen	62,388	70.00
Jinhui town	金汇镇	Jīnhuì Zhèn	cin we tzen	108,264	71.72
Situan town	四团镇	Sìtuán Zhèn	sy deu tzen	65,389	74.10
Qingcun town	青村镇	Qīngcūn Zhèn	tsin tsen tzen	89,163	74.31
Zhelin town	柘林镇	Zhèlín Zhèn	tzau lin tzen	62,589	73.50
Haiwan town	海湾镇	Hǎiwān Zhèn	he ue tzen	28,457	100.60
Fengpu Community	奉浦社区	Fèngpǔ Shèqū	von phu zau chiu	57,341	20.80
Shanghai Fengxian Bay Tourism Zone	上海市奉贤区海湾旅游区	Shànghǎi Shì Fèngxián Qū Hǎiwān Lǚyóuqū	zaon he zy von yi chiu he ue liu yoe chiu	29,151	13.20
Jinhai Community	金海社区	Jīnhǎi Shèqū	cin he zau chiu	32,123	18.49
Shanghai Seaport Comprehensive Economic Development Zone	上海海港综合经济开发区	Shànghǎi Hǎigǎng Zònghé Jīngjì Kāifāqū	zaon he kaon tzon keq cin tzij khe faq chiu	10,475	15.00

== Climate ==
Climate data for Fengxian District, elevation 5 m (16 ft), (1991–2020 normals, extremes 1951–present)
Month	Jan	Feb	Mar	Apr	May	Jun	Jul	Aug	Sep	Oct	Nov	Dec	Year
Record high °C (°F)	23.3 (73.9)	27.6 (81.7)	30.0 (86.0)	33.1 (91.6)	35.8 (96.4)	36.5 (97.7)	39.6 (103.3)	40.3 (104.5)	36.5 (97.7)	33.9 (93.0)	28.7 (83.7)	24.9 (76.8)	40.3 (104.5)
Mean daily maximum °C (°F)	8.5 (47.3)	10.3 (50.5)	14.0 (57.2)	19.5 (67.1)	24.3 (75.7)	27.3 (81.1)	31.7 (89.1)	31.4 (88.5)	27.9 (82.2)	23.2 (73.8)	17.7 (63.9)	11.3 (52.3)	20.6 (69.1)
Daily mean °C (°F)	4.5 (40.1)	6.1 (43.0)	9.7 (49.5)	14.9 (58.8)	20.1 (68.2)	23.8 (74.8)	28.1 (82.6)	28.0 (82.4)	24.0 (75.2)	18.8 (65.8)	13.1 (55.6)	7.9 (46.2)	16.6 (61.9)
Mean daily minimum °C (°F)	1.2 (34.2)	2.6 (36.7)	6.1 (43.0)	11.2 (52.2)	16.5 (61.7)	21.0 (69.8)	25.4 (77.7)	25.3 (77.5)	20.9 (69.6)	15.0 (59.0)	9.2 (48.6)	5.3 (41.5)	13.3 (56.0)
Record low °C (°F)	−10.1 (13.8)	−9.6 (14.7)	−5.3 (22.5)	−0.4 (31.3)	6.9 (44.4)	10.4 (50.7)	17.0 (62.6)	17.5 (63.5)	10.5 (50.9)	1.2 (34.2)	−5.0 (23.0)	−9.3 (15.3)	−10.1 (13.8)
Average precipitation mm (inches)	70.5 (2.78)	66.0 (2.60)	100.8 (3.97)	85.0 (3.35)	97.8 (3.85)	220.7 (8.69)	128.3 (5.05)	181.6 (7.15)	112.5 (4.43)	63.1 (2.48)	61.9 (2.44)	50.4 (1.98)	1,238.6 (48.77)
Average precipitation days (≥ 0.1 mm)	11.0	10.5	13.1	12.0	11.6	15.0	10.9	12.0	10.1	7.2	9.3	8.8	131.5
Average snowy days	2.3	1.6	0.5	0.1	0	0	0	0	0	0	0.1	0.8	5.4
Average relative humidity (%)	78	78	78	78	79	85	82	83	82	79	79	69	79
Mean monthly sunshine hours	117.2	119.5	142.6	168.2	177.5	134.2	225.5	216.3	173.8	166.5	136.3	133.7	1,911.3
Percentage possible sunshine	36	38	38	43	42	32	53	53	47	48	43	43	43
Source: China Meteorological Administration

== Economy ==
M&G Stationery formerly had its corporate headquarters in the district. Tesla Gigafactory 3 touches the eastern district border.
