= Xinzhuang station (Shanghai Metro) =

Shanghai Metro interchange station

Xinzhuang 莘庄
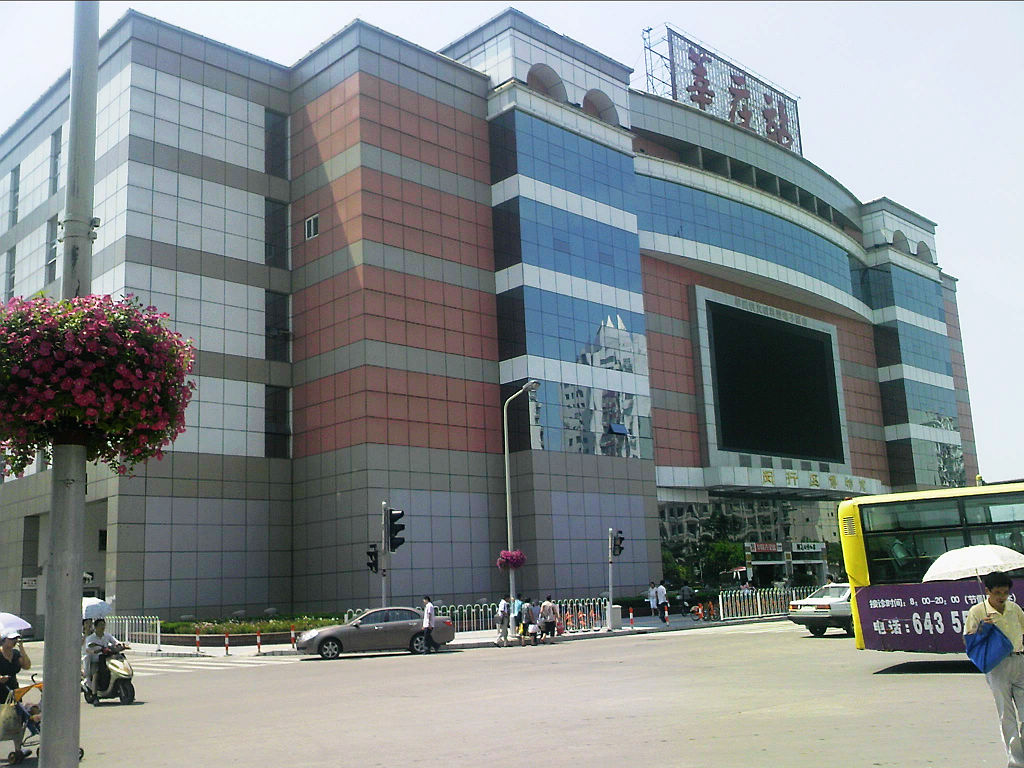
- Old station building

General information
- Location: Xinzhuang, Minhang District, Shanghai; China
- Coordinates: 31°06′40″N 121°23′07″E
- System: Shanghai Metro
- Operator: Shanghai No. 1 Metro Operation Co. Ltd.
- Lines: Line 1; Line 5
- Platforms: 4 (2 side platforms for Line 1, 2 side platforms for Line 5)
- Tracks: 4
- Connections: Xinzhuang Railway station (XZH)

Construction
- Structure type: At-grade
- Accessible: Yes

Other information
- Station code: L01/01

History
- Opened: 28 December 1996; 29 years ago (Line 1); 25 November 2003; 22 years ago (Line 5)

Services
Preceding station	Shanghai Metro	Following station
Waihuanlu towards Fujin Road	Line 1	Terminus
Terminus	Line 5	Chunshen Road towards Fengxian Xincheng or Minhang Development Zone
Location
- Location within Shanghai

Xinzhuang (Chinese: 莘庄; pinyin: Xīnzhuāng) is an interchange station on the Shanghai Metro. It is the southern terminus of Line 1 and the northern terminus of Line 5. It is one of the busiest stations in the Shanghai Metro, serving 230,000 passengers every day. Both Line 1 and Line 5's stations have two side platforms and two tracks, with a wall separating the Line 1 and the Line 5 platforms.

The station opened on Line 1 on 28 December 1996, with the Line 5 interchange having opened on 25 November 2003.

== Station Layout ==
2F	Concourse	Faregates, Station Agent
2F	Entrances and Exits	North/South exits
1F	Side platform, doors open on the right
1F	Northbound	← Line 1 towards Fujin Road (Waihuanlu)
1F	Southbound	Line 1 termination track →
1F	Side platform, doors open on the right
1F	Side platform, doors open on the right
1F	Northbound	← Line 5 termination track
1F	Southbound	Line 5 towards Fengxian Xincheng or Minhang Development Zone (Chunshen Road) →
1F	Side platform, doors open on the right

== Exits ==
The current exits of the station are not the original exits before the reconstruction of Xinzhuang station, and will be replaced with formal ones (after the completion of the reconstruction).

Xinzhuang station Exit List
Exit No.	Location
North 1st Exit (Temporary)	South of East Xinjian Road, west of South Shuiqing Road
North 2nd Exit (Temporary)	South of East Xinjian Road, east of South Shuiqing Road
South Exit (Temporary)	North of Xinzhu Road, northwest of Dushi Road

== Bus Connections ==
As an important terminal of Shanghai Metro system, Xinzhuang station has various bus connections, with local bus routes connecting residence areas around, and longer-distance bus routes serving suburban districts including Fengxian, Jinshan and Songjiang.

== Future Development ==
Xinzhuang station is now undergoing reconstruction, which is contributed by Sun Hung Kai Properties and local official developers. The reconstruction will include the building of new metro stations for Line 1 and 5, new railway station for Shanghai–Kunming Railway and Jinshan Railway and indoor bus and taxi terminals. Commercials and residences will also be built on the platform holding the new station complex.

== Gallery ==
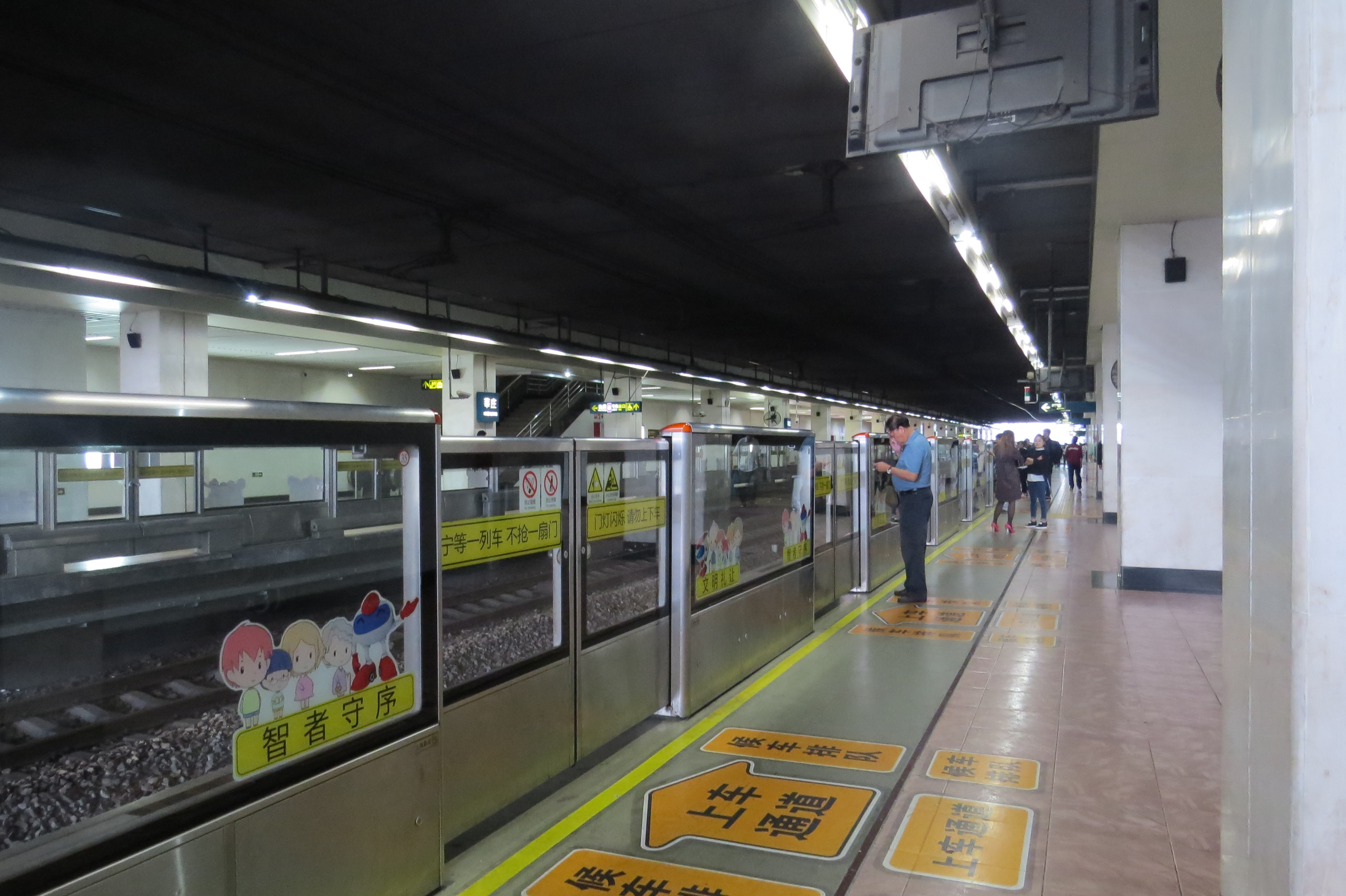
Line 1 platform

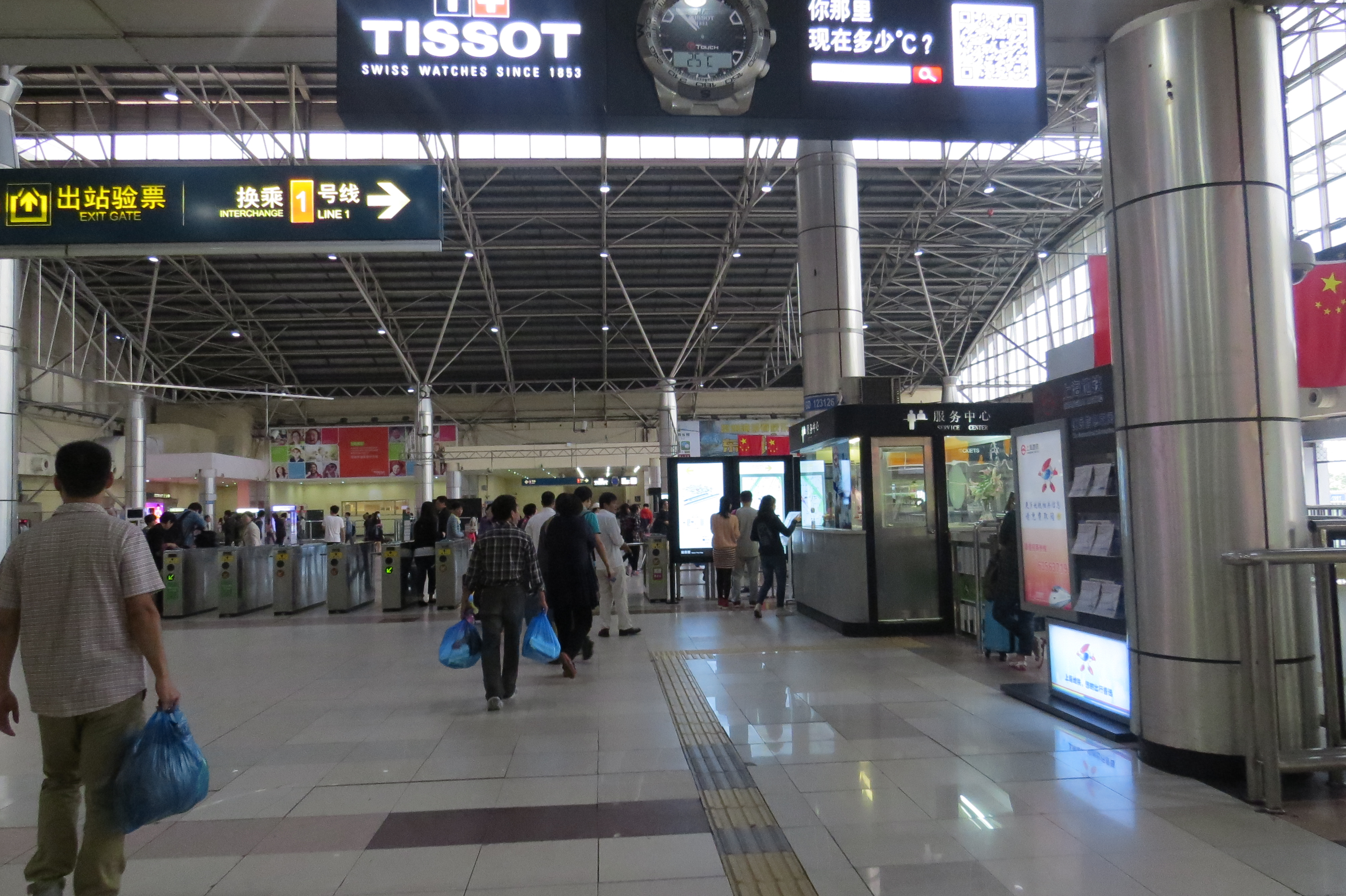
Concourse
