= East Kangqiao station =

Railway station in Shanghai, China

East Kangqiao 康桥东
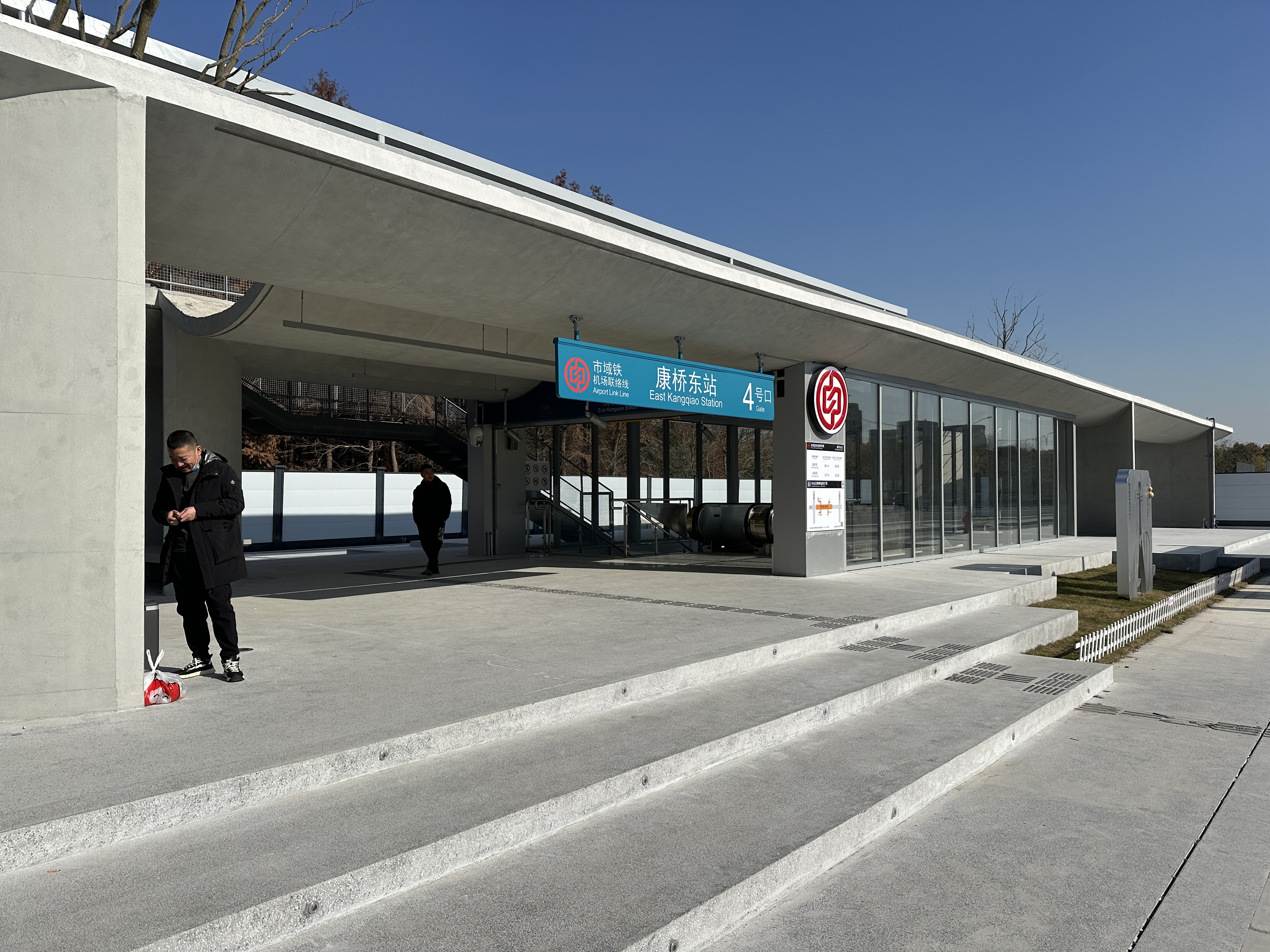
- Exit 4 of the station

General information
- Location: East of intersection of Kangren Road & Kangxin Highway; Kangqiao, Pudong, Shanghai; China
- Coordinates: 31°08′56.6″N 121°36′38.5″E
- Owner: Shentong Metro Group
- Operator: Shanghai Suburban Railway
- Lines: Airport Link Line; Line 21 (Under construction)
- Platforms: 2 (2 side platforms)
- Tracks: 4

Construction
- Structure type: Underground

History
- Opened: 27 December 2024
- Former names: Zhangjiang

Services
Preceding station	Shanghai Suburban Railway	Following station
South Sanlin towards Hongqiao Airport Terminal 2	Airport Link Line	Shanghai International Resort towards Pudong Airport Terminal 1&2
Location

East Kangqiao station (Chinese: 康桥东站; pinyin: Kāng qiáo dōng zhàn) is an underground railway station on the Airport Link Line of the Shanghai Suburban Railway. It is located in Kangqiao, Pudong district, at the future intersection of Kangren Road and Ciqiao Road. The planning name of the station was Zhangjiang station (Chinese: 张江站; pinyin: Zhāng jiāng zhàn). The station opened with the first phase of the Airport Link Line on 27 December 2024 and is planned to become an interchange station with Line 21 of the Shanghai Metro.

== Design ==
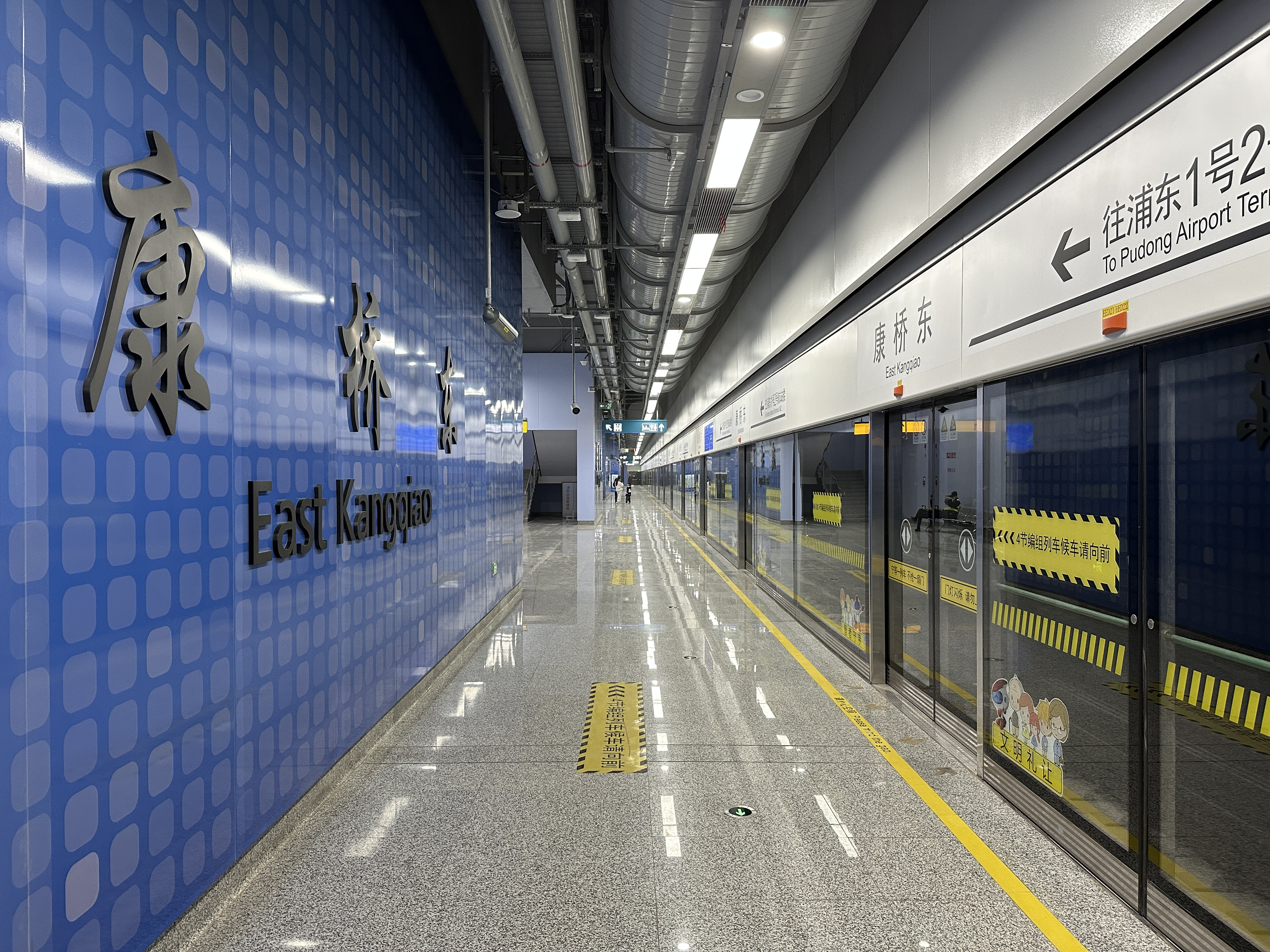
Platform towards Pudong Airport Terminal 1&2

The station was initially planned as an elevated station, before it was changed to an underground station during feasibility studies for "planning reasons". The station has a total area of 49,453 square metres (532,310 sq ft), with a length of 691.20 metres (2,267.7 ft) and a width of 37.2 metres (122 ft). The station is located within the Shanghai Outer Ring Expressway Protected Green Space, surrounded by dense water works. It is located south of Zhangjiang Hi-Tech Park. The entrances and exits connect with leisure facilities outside the station and are designed in the form of a semi-arched canopy in the shape of a water wave. An open view allows those within the station concourse to view the wetlands outside. The theme of the station design was "entering the waters" (Chinese: 入水) and attempts to reflect both the technological innovations and progress made by Zhangjiang and the dense waterworks surrounding the station. The Airport Link Line station has four exits and will be connected to the Line 21 metro station through an underpass, with fare gates to separate the two paid zones. The floor plans included a COVID-19 testing booth to be built near exit 2.

The subsequent development plan in the surrounding area is part of the 2023 Shanghai Urban Design Challenge, hosted by the Shanghai Municipal Planning and Natural Resources Bureau. Muhe Landscape Design Company and MANDAWORKS Aktiebolag won the Outstanding Design award for their design titled "Porous Forest" (Chinese: 多孔森林). Under the winning design, some fast-growing trees were removed to allow space for the construction of public facilities such as a library and exercise facilities, while the majority of the forested area is retained.

== Operations ==
East Kangqiao station is equipped with arrival and departure lines and a single crossing line and is able to accommodate passing and returning trains. During the preparations for the opening of the Airport Link Line, there was a proposal to operate a partial route from Hongqiao Airport Terminal 2 to Zhangjiang in the early stage of operation; these plans were never followed through. According to calculations made in Song et al. (2024), if the airport link line operates with both express and local trains, the crossing point for the express trains towards both Hongqiao and Pudong Airport will be at East Kangqiao station. The Airport Link Line will only operate with local trains stopping at all stops between the two airports at the start of operations.

After the Shanghai South station branch line to Shanghai East is opened in the future, China Railway trains will pass through this station without stopping.

The station opened on 27 December 2024 along with the first phase of the Airport Link Line.
