= Shanghai International Resort station =

Suburban railway station in Shanghai

Shanghai International Resort 上海国际旅游度假区
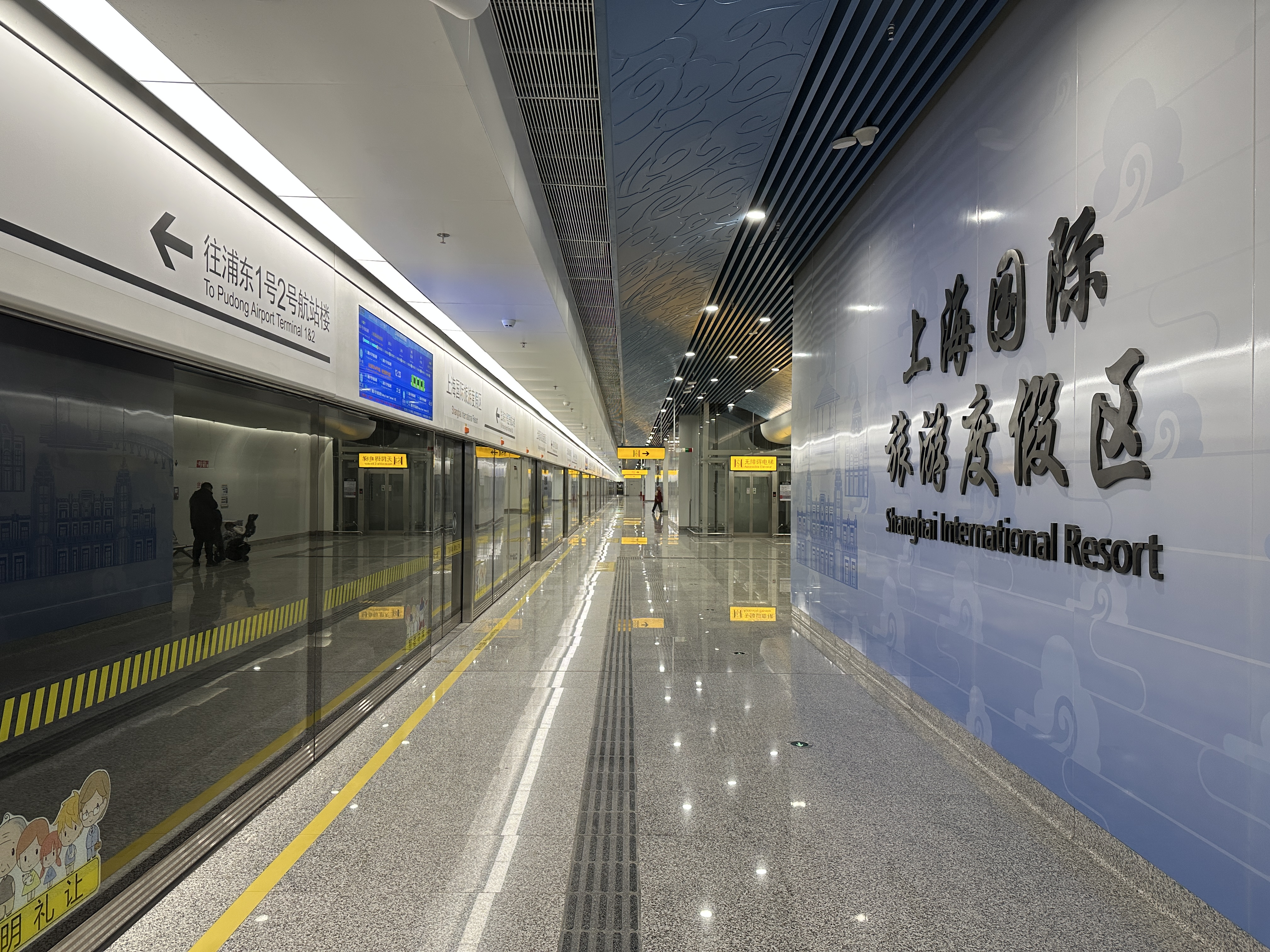
- Platform towards Pudong Airport Terminal 1&2

General information
- Location: Intersection of Chuanzhan Road and Tanghuang Road, Chuansha; Pudong, Shanghai; China
- Coordinates: 31°09′31″N 121°40′33″E
- Owner: Shentong Metro Group
- Operator: Shanghai Suburban Railway
- Line: Airport Link Line
- Platforms: 2 (2 island platforms)
- Tracks: 2

Construction
- Structure type: Underground

Other information
- Status: Operational

History
- Opened: 27 December 2024

Services
Preceding station	Shanghai Suburban Railway	Following station
East Kangqiao towards Hongqiao Airport Terminal 2	Airport Link Line	Pudong Airport Terminal 1&2 Terminus
Location

Shanghai International Resort station (simplified Chinese: 上海国际旅游度假区站; traditional Chinese: 上海國際旅游度假區站; pinyin: Shànghǎi guójì lǚyóu dùjià qū zhàn) is an underground station of Airport Link Line, located on the town of Chuansha in Pudong, Shanghai. The station is built for the future expansion area of Shanghai Disney Resort. It is located at the intersection of Chuanzhan Road and Tanghuang Road, about 2 kilometres (1.2 mi) from Disney Resort metro station. It opened on December 27, 2024.
