= South Sanlin station =

Suburban railway station in Shanghai

South Sanlin 三林南
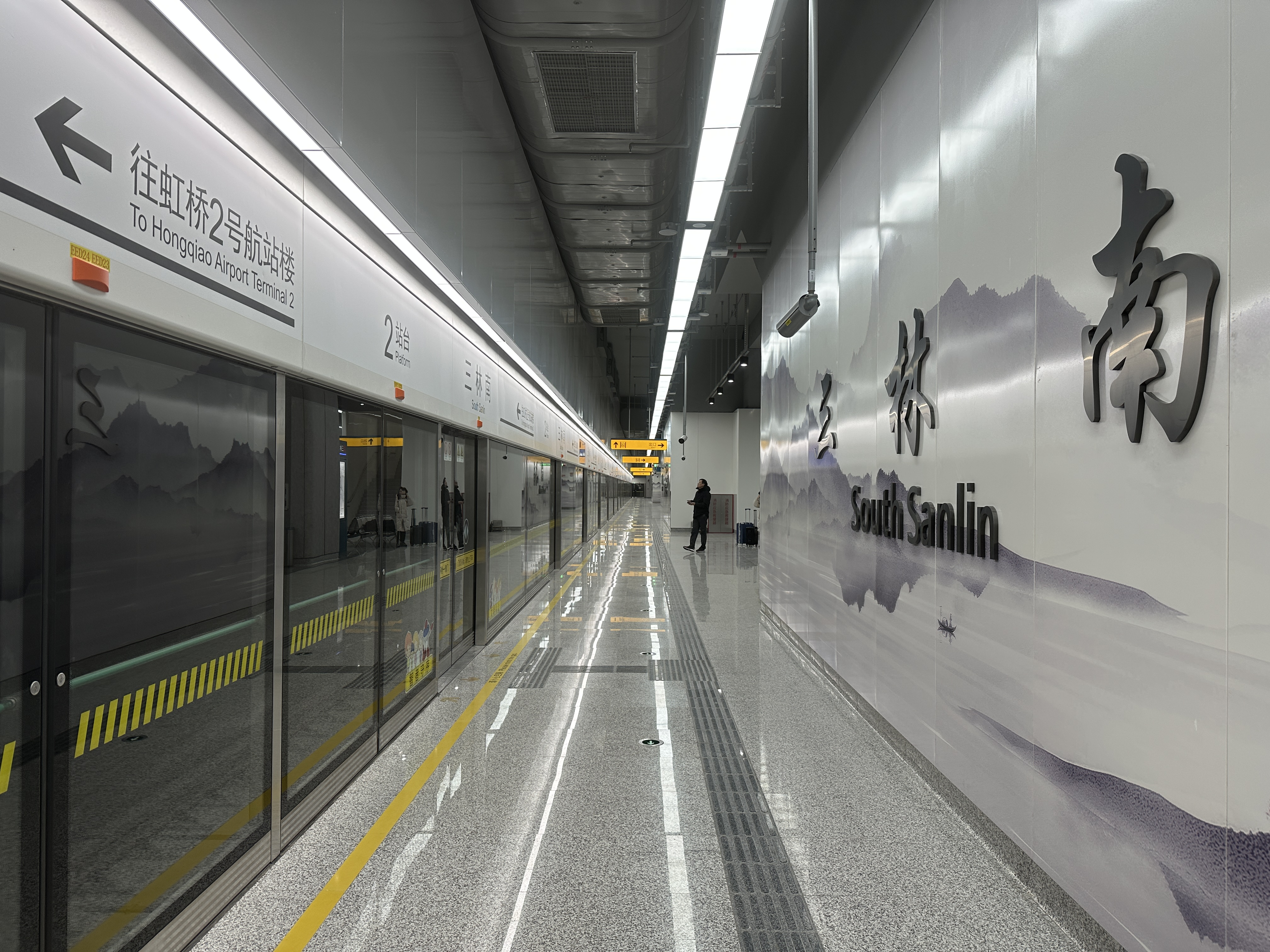
- Platform towards Hongqiao Airport Terminal 2

General information
- Location: Intersection of Yunmian Road and Pujin Road; Sanlin, Pudong, Shanghai; China
- Coordinates: 31°7′41.8″N 121°29′00.5″E
- Owner: Shentong Metro Group
- Operator: Shanghai Suburban Railway
- Lines: Airport Link Line; Line 19 (Under construction)
- Platforms: 2(2 side platforms)
- Tracks: 4

Construction
- Structure type: Underground

Other information
- Status: Under operation

History
- Opened: 27 December 2024

Services
Preceding station	Shanghai Suburban Railway	Following station
Jinghong Road towards Hongqiao Airport Terminal 2	Airport Link Line	East Kangqiao towards Pudong Airport Terminal 1&2
Location

South Sanlin station (Chinese: 三林南站; pinyin: Sān lín nán zhàn) is an underground station located on the intersection of Wanting Road and Yunmian Road in the town of Sanlin, Pudong, Shanghai.

It opened on 27 December 2024 following the commencement of the Airport Link Line of the Shanghai Suburban Railway. The station is due to serve as an interchange station with Line 19 of Shanghai Metro.
