= Hongqiao transportation hub =

Major intermodal passenger transport hub in Shanghai

- Simplified Chinese: 虹桥综合交通枢纽
- Traditional Chinese: 虹橋綜合交通樞紐
Transcriptions
Standard Mandarin
- Hanyu Pinyin: Hóngqiáo Zōnghé Jiāotōng Shūniǔ

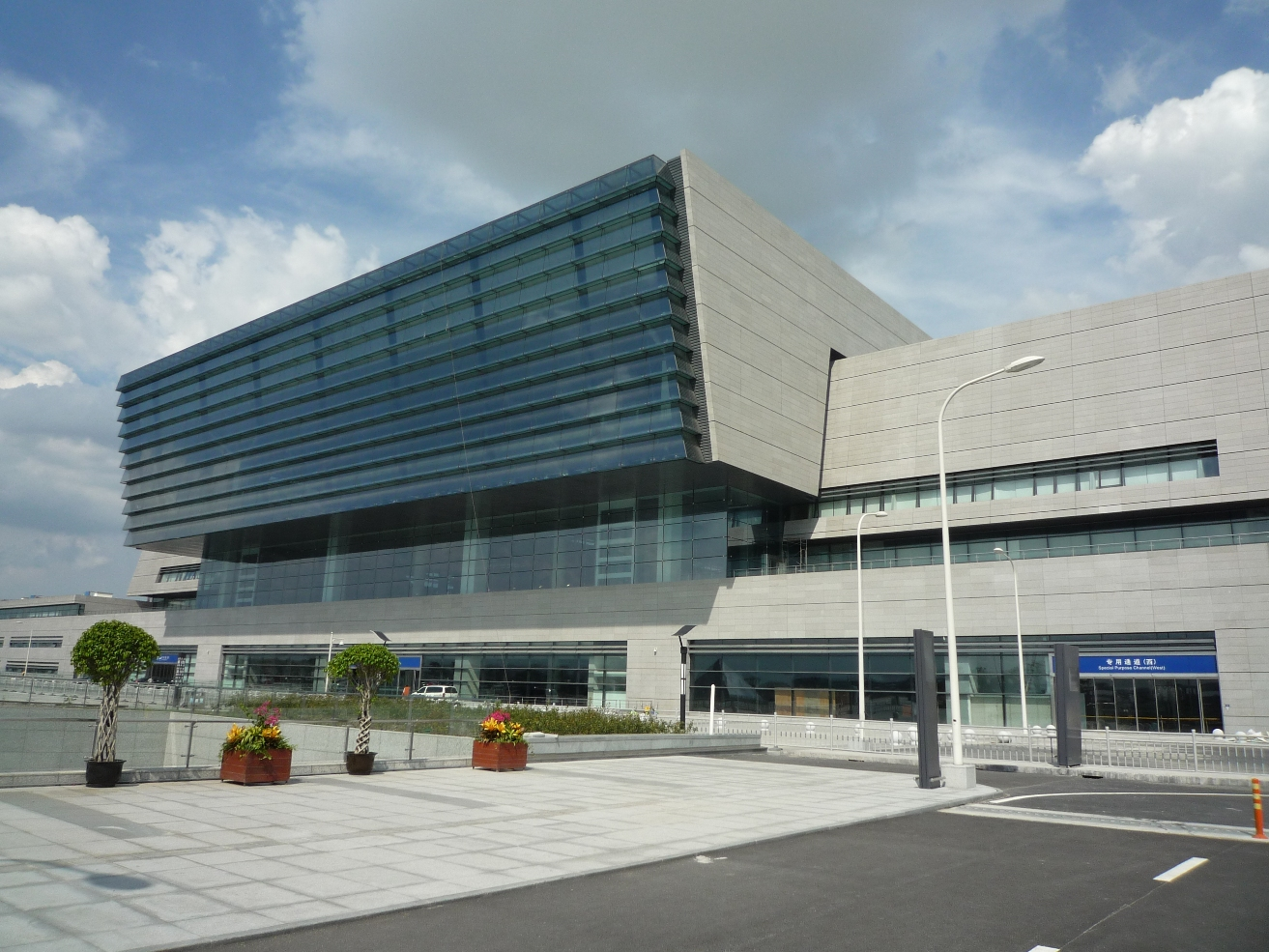
Shanghai Hongqiao railway station, a major component of the hub

The Hongqiao comprehensive transportation hub (Chinese: 虹桥综合交通枢纽; pinyin: Hóngqiáo Zōnghé Jiāotōng Shūniǔ) is a major intermodal passenger transport hub situated in the western suburb district of Changning and Minhang of Shanghai. The hub consists of Shanghai Hongqiao International Airport, the intercity high-speed Shanghai Hongqiao railway station, three metro lines, buses, taxicabs and a reserved maglev station for future uses. Hongqiao hub is the first of its kind in China and the model has been followed by various other Chinese cities, including Hangzhou, Guangzhou and Shenzhen.

== History ==
Prior to the intermodal transportation center, Hongqiao Airport was refurbished in 1964 as then Shanghai's new major airport. In 2005, the idea of Hongqiao comprehensive transportation hub was officially put forward by Ministry of Railways of China and Shanghai municipal government. Shanghai Rainbow Investment Corp. was founded in 2006 by Shanghai government to be the sole authorized entity in charge of the construction and development project of the hub. As part of the infrastructure plan of World Expo 2010, the hub was completed before the end of 2009 and was put into use before the expo in 2010.

== Modes of transport ==
=== Air ===
Shanghai Hongqiao International Airport mainly serves domestic flights and regional flights to Japan and South Korea. In 2016, Hongqiao Airport handled 40,460,135 passengers, making it the 7th busiest airport in China and the 45th busiest in the world.

=== High-speed rail ===
Shanghai Hongqiao railway station is one of the three major railway stations of Shanghai and the largest railway station in Asia. It offers intercity high-speed railway services to all of the major Chinese cities. Most important and well-known rail lines includes the Shanghai–Nanjing intercity railway, the Shanghai–Hangzhou high-speed railway (the first section of the future Shanghai–Kunming high-speed railway), and the Beijing–Shanghai high-speed railway.

=== Metro ===
There are currently three metro lines serving the hub: Line 2, Line 10 and Line 17. Line 2 is an east–west line, connecting the hub to old city center, Lujiazui financial district, Zhangjiang Hi-Tech Park and Shanghai Pudong International Airport. Line 10 is a southwest–northeast line, offering connections to the dense residential districts of Yangpu and Hongkou via downtown Shanghai. Line 17 runs further westward, serving the suburban Qingpu District.

- Line 2: from Panxiang Road · Shanghai National Accounting Institute to Pudong Airport Terminal 1&2
- Line 10: from Hongqiao Railway Station to Jilong Road
- Line 17: from Xicen to Hongqiao Railway Station

=== Suburban railway ===
Hongqiao Airport Terminal 2 is currently served by the Airport Link Line, and in the future, the Jiamin Line and the Demonstration Area Line will also be introduced. It is located between Hongqiao Airport and Hongqiao railway station, and was originally planned for maglev train use. After the maglev project was postponed, part of the reserved space was used for the construction of the suburban railway. The Airport Link Line connects Shanghai's two major airports, Hongqiao and Pudong, providing faster access between them. In addition, it also passes through the Shanghai International Resort, where Shanghai Disneyland is located.

=== Other means ===
Bus services and taxicab services are available inside the terminal building of airport and the railway station.

Elevated roads are constructed and have been put into service, offering access to various destinations in Shanghai and neighboring cities.

== Remarks ==
Various other major Chinese cities are currently investing to build similar transportation hub in their cities, including Hangzhou, Guangzhou and Shenzhen. Shanghai government is committed to construct another such hub in eastern Shanghai. Based on Shanghai Pudong International Airport, the planned "Pudong transportation hub" consists of the existing airport and a maglev station, with an additional high-speed railway station and multiple metro lines.

== Future ==
Shanghai Intercity Maglev Station is currently in hibernation until the new maglev created by local engineers are ready. The new maglev technology developed by CRRC in Qingdao is currently under testing at Shanghai Tongji University. So far the maglev managed to reach a maximum speed of 600km/h.
