= Nanhui Line =

Commuter rail line on the Shanghai Suburban Railway

Nanhui Line (南汇线)

Overview
- Other names: Nanhui Branch Line (南汇支线), Lianggang Express Line (两港快线) and Free Trade Zone Express Line
- Status: Under construction
- Locale: Pudong, Shanghai, China
- Termini: Lingang Industrial Park; Mainline: Shanghai East railway station; Branch: Pudong International Airport T3 Terminal
- Connecting lines: 2 21 Maglev Airport Link
- Stations: 6

Service
- Type: Regional Rail
- System: Shanghai Suburban Railway
- Operator(s): Shentong Metro Group
- Depot(s): Xiayan Road Depot
- Rolling stock: 4 car/8 car Class C (Express train) trains

History
- Commenced: January 4, 2022; 4 years ago
- Planned opening: December 31, 2025; 3 months ago

Technical
- Line length: Main line: 26.3 km (16 mi); Branch line: 8.8 km (5 mi)
- Number of tracks: 2
- Track gauge: 1,435 mm (4 ft 8 1/2 in)
- Electrification: Overhead lines (AC 25 kV)
- Operating speed: 160 km/h (99 mph)

Nanhui Line (simplified Chinese: 南汇线; traditional Chinese: 南匯線; pinyin: Nán Huì Xiàn) is a commuter rail line currently under planning on the Shanghai Suburban Railway, and will be run by Shentong Metro Group. The Nanhui Line is an express suburban railway between the Lingang New Area and Pudong Hub, Hongqiao Hub and Shanghai's main urban area. The plan published public review between April 29 to May 28 by the Shanghai Transportation Commission. The special plan (draft) was for the selection of the Nanhui Line (Pudong Hub-Lingang Industrial Park Station).

It runs from Lingang Industrial Park in Pudong to Shanghai East railway station (mainline) or Pudong International Airport T3 Terminal (branch) in Pudong. The 26.3-kilometer (16.3 mi) express line with 8.8 km (5.5 mi) branch is expected to shorten the travel time between Lingang and Pudong International Airport to under 15 minutes upon completion in 2025. Construction is started in 2022. The line is expected to open at the end of 2025. It will achieve one-hour access to important external transportation hubs for Lingang.

Urban transit operation is adopted with operations similar rapid transit, and passengers can use the Shanghai public transport card to enter and exit the station. The line will use Class C (Express train) stocks with a maximum operating speed of 160 km/h (99 mph). The route from Pudong International Airport T3 terminal heads south along Lianggang Avenue, turns east at Dongda Highway, turns south at Qiaojiang Road, and enters the central activity area of Lingang New Area; the other line leads from Shanghai East Railway Station, and connect to Xiayan Road Station along the south side of Shenjiahu Expressway. Most of the route will be elevated.

== History ==
In 2016, the Nanhui line was included in the plan in the Shanghai 2035 general plan. In November 2019, Zhu Zhisong, Deputy Secretary-General of the Shanghai Municipal Government and Executive Deputy Director of the Management Committee of the Lingang New Area of the Pilot Free Trade Zone, revealed that the Lingang New Area is to be connected to urban Shanghai via Pudong International Airport, Hongqiao International Airport, Shanghai South railway station, as part of an express railway network. The "Pudong Comprehensive Transportation Hub Special Plan" announced in February 2020 mentioned the Nanhui Line. The "Three-year Action Plan for Traffic Improvement in the Lingang New Area of China (Shanghai) Pilot Free Trade Zone (2020-2022)" published in March 2020 proposes to accelerate the implementation of the Nanhui Line before 2022. In April 2020, the "Higher Quality Integrated Development Plan for Transportation in the Yangtze River Delta" proposed "Planning and Construction of Shanghai Nanhui Line". The development plan will last until 2025 and look forward to 2035. In June 2020, the China Railway Design Corporation began to conduct a feasibility study. The preliminary acceptance test will be completed in September 2020. From April 29 to May 28, 2021, the Municipal Transportation Commission publicized the special plan (draft) for the selection of the Shanghai Nanhui Line (Pudong Hub ~ Lingang Industrial Park Station).

== Proposed stations ==
=== Service routes ===
Routes		Station name		Connections	Distance km		Location
M	B	English	Chinese	Connections	Distance km		Location
Mainline
↑ Planned through-service to/from Fengjing via the Nanfeng ↑
●	●	North Dishuihu	滴水湖北		0	0	Pudong
●	●	Xinghaiwan Road	星海湾路		3.470	3.470	Pudong
●	●	Binhai Forest Park	滨海森林公园		4.430	7.900	Pudong
●	●	Pengxiang Road	鹏翔路		15.783	23.683	Pudong
●	|	Shanghai East railway station	上海东站	21 (planned) Airport Link (u/c) (u/c)	6.967	30.650	Pudong
Branchline							Pudong
|	●	Pudong Airport Terminal 3	浦东3号航站楼	2 21 (planned) Maglev (planned) Shanghai Pudong Airport APM Airport Link	3.653	27.336	
↓ Through-service to/from Hongqiao Railway Station via the Airport Link ↓

=== Future extensions ===
Future extension to Situan is under further planning.
