= Zhongchun Road station =

Railway and metro station in Shanghai, China

Zhongchun Road 中春路
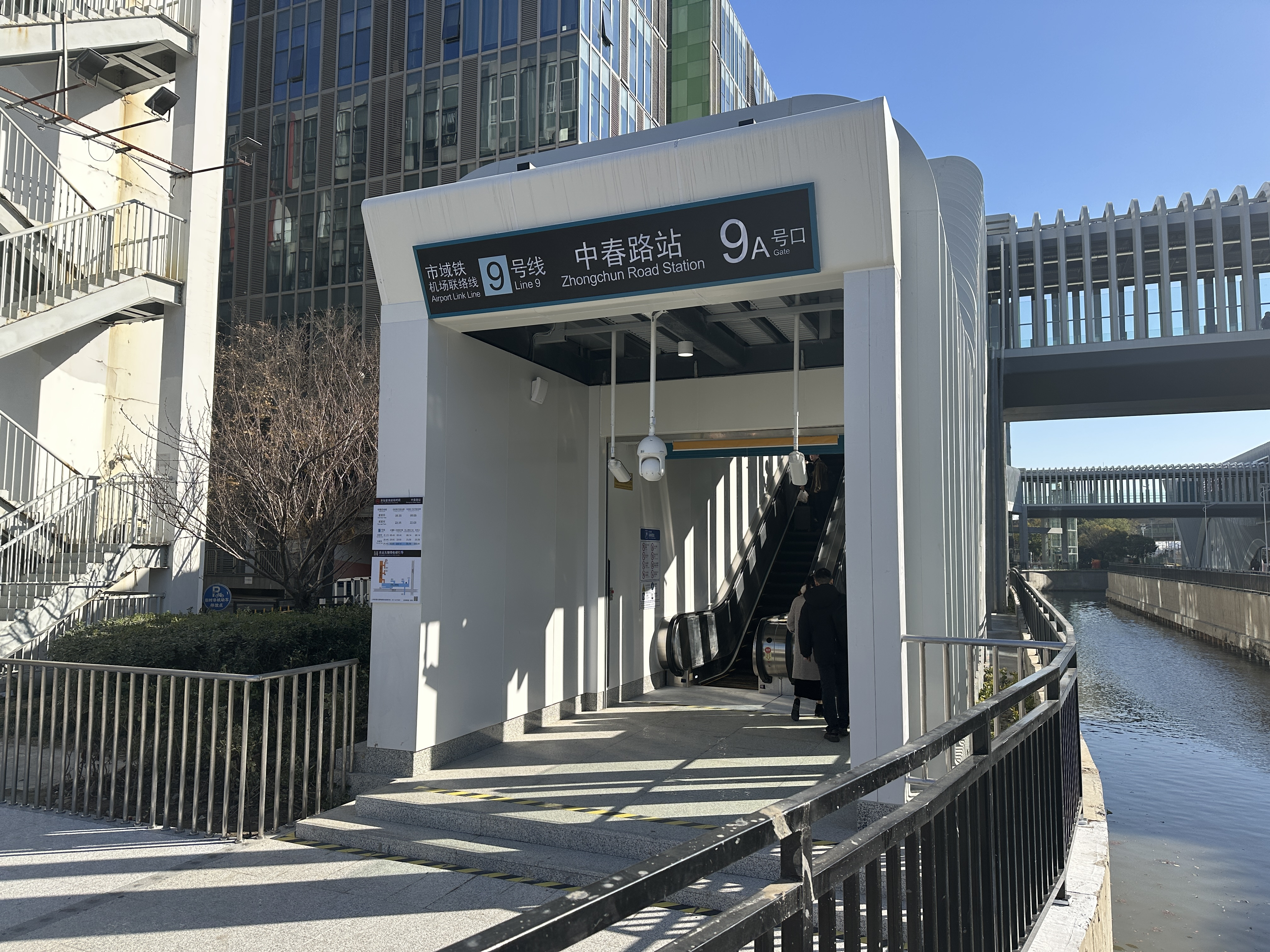
- Exit 9A of the station

General information
- Location: Husong Highway (沪松公路) and Zhongchun Road; Qibao, Minhang District, Shanghai; China
- Coordinates: 31.1503°N 121.331°E
- Operator: Shanghai No. 1 Metro Operation Co. Ltd.; Shanghai Suburban Railway
- Lines: Line 9; Airport Link Line
- Platforms: 5 (1 island and 3 side platforms)
- Tracks: 5

Construction
- Structure type: Underground
- Accessible: Yes

History
- Opened: December 29, 2007 (Line 9); December 27, 2024 (Airport Link Line)

Services
Preceding station	Shanghai Metro	Following station
Jiuting towards Shanghai Songjiang Railway Station	Line 9	Qibao towards Caolu
Preceding station	Shanghai Suburban Railway	Following station
Hongqiao Airport Terminal 2 Terminus	Airport Link Line	Jinghong Road towards Pudong Airport Terminal 1&2
Location
- Location within Shanghai

Zhongchun Road (Chinese: 中春路; pinyin: Zhōngchūn Lù) is a station on Line 9 of the Shanghai Metro, and on the Airport Link Line of the Shanghai Suburban Railway. The station is located at the intersection of Husong Highway and Zhongchun Road in Qibao, Minhang District. It was first opened on December 29, 2007, as part of Line 9. The station became an interchange station when the first phase of the Airport Link Line opened on December 27, 2024.

== History ==
Zhongchun Road was originally not part of the original Line 9 design, with only two tracks leading out of Jiuting Depot planned to the west of the current station. In March 2004, the Ministry of Railways (MOR) revised the layout for railway stations built in Shanghai, with a high-speed rail station planned in Qibao. The government of Shanghai subsequently planned to route Lines 2 and 10 to the newly proposed station, and in November Shentong Metro Group decided to insert an additional station to serve the proposed railway station. One of the tracks to Jiuting Depot, which had already started construction, was expanded to become the new station, with revisions completed by March 2005 and construction drawing design starting in May. However, the MOR decided that the high-speed rail station would be moved to Hongqiao (to become the present day Shanghai Hongqiao railway station). Shentong Metro ultimately decided to keep the newly-added Zhongchun Road station, while rerouting Line 2 and Line 10 to the new station in Hongqiao. Zhongchun Road station opened on December 29, 2007, as part of Phase 1 of Line 9.

From June until December 2024, to prepare for the opening of the Airport Link Line section of the station, several exits of the Line 9 segment of the station were closed to facilitate the construction of a walkway between the two lines. The Airport Link Line section started operations on December 27, 2024.

== Station Layout ==
The Line 9 station was constructed as a large hub station in anticipation of the originally proposed high-speed rail station, with a returning track originally planned at neighbouring Qibao station moved here. The station also includes transfer walkways to Line 2 and Line 10, which are not currently in use.

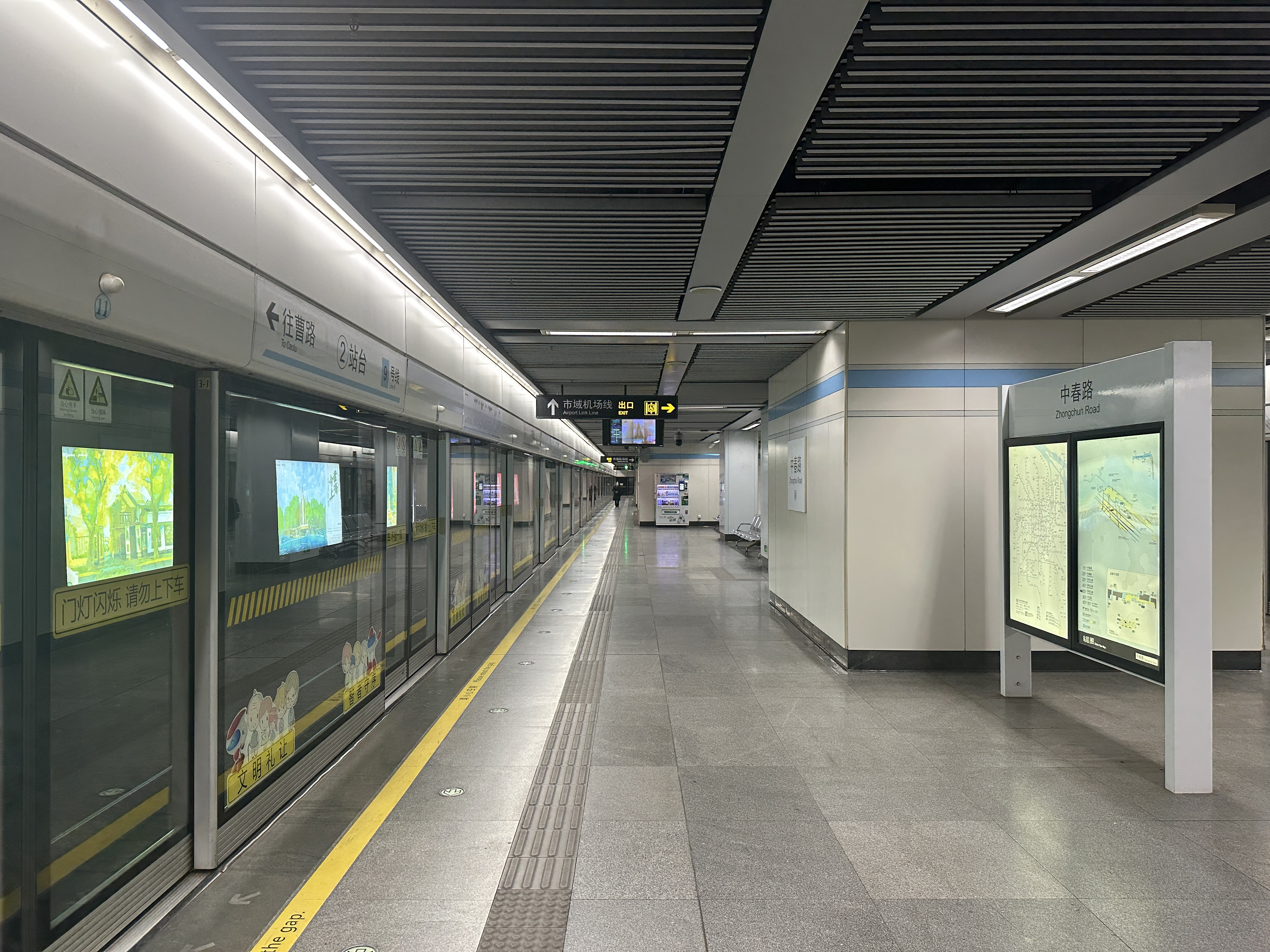
Line 9 platforms

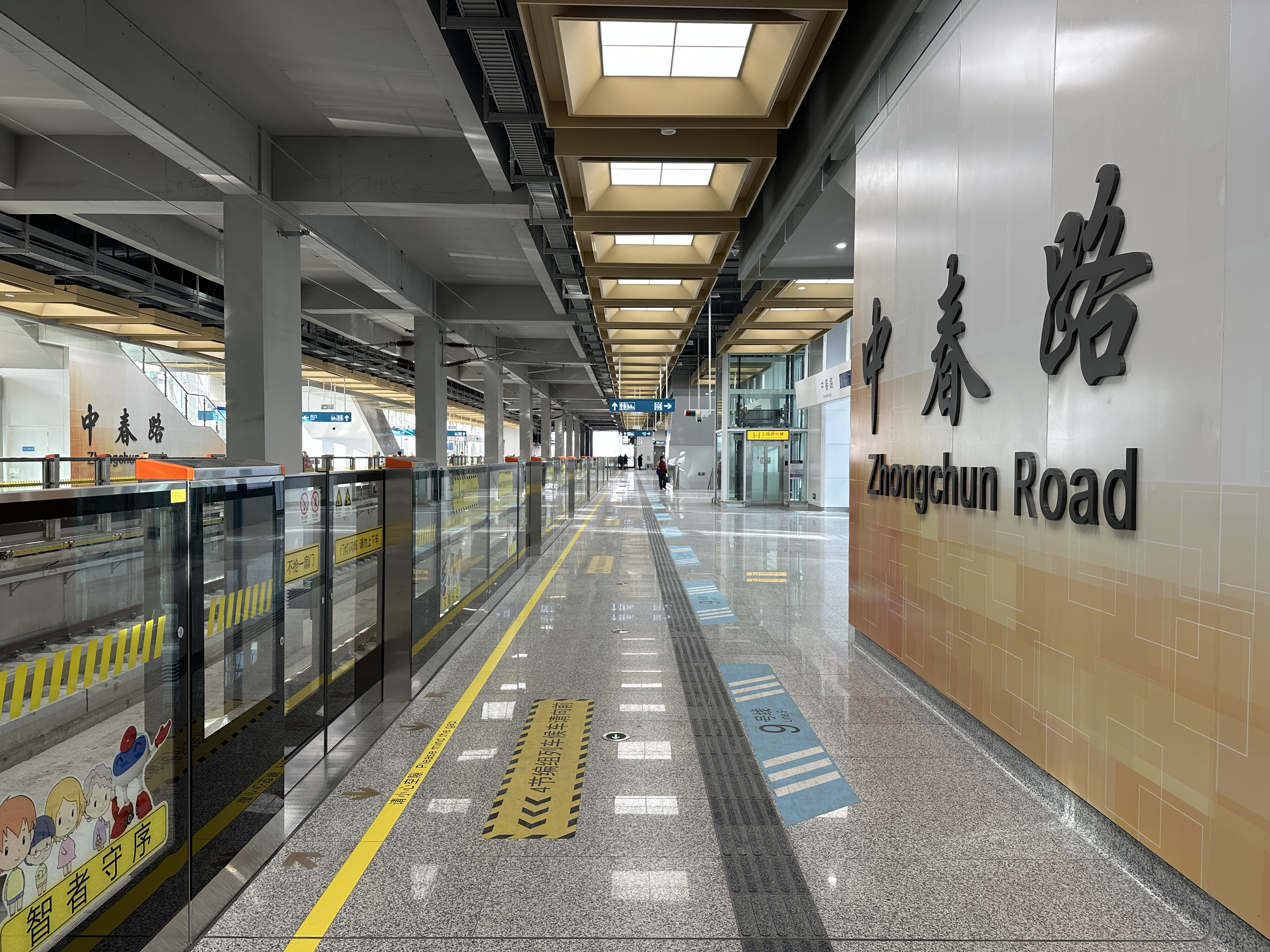
Airport Link Line platforms

2	Airport Link Line Concourse
G	Entrances and Exits	Exits 1-6, 8 & 9
G	Side platform, doors open on the right
G	← Airport Link Line towards Hongqiao Airport Terminal 2
G	Airport Link Line towards Pudong Airport Terminal 1&2 (Jinghong Road) →
G	Side platform, doors open on the right
B1	Line 9 Concourse
B2	Side platform, doors open on the right
B2	← Line 9 towards Songjiang South Railway Station (Jiuting)
B2	Not in service
B2	Island platform, doors open on the left
B2	Line 9 towards Caolu (Qibao) →
