= Kangqiao =

Coordinates: 31°21′N 105°04′E

Kangqiao 康桥
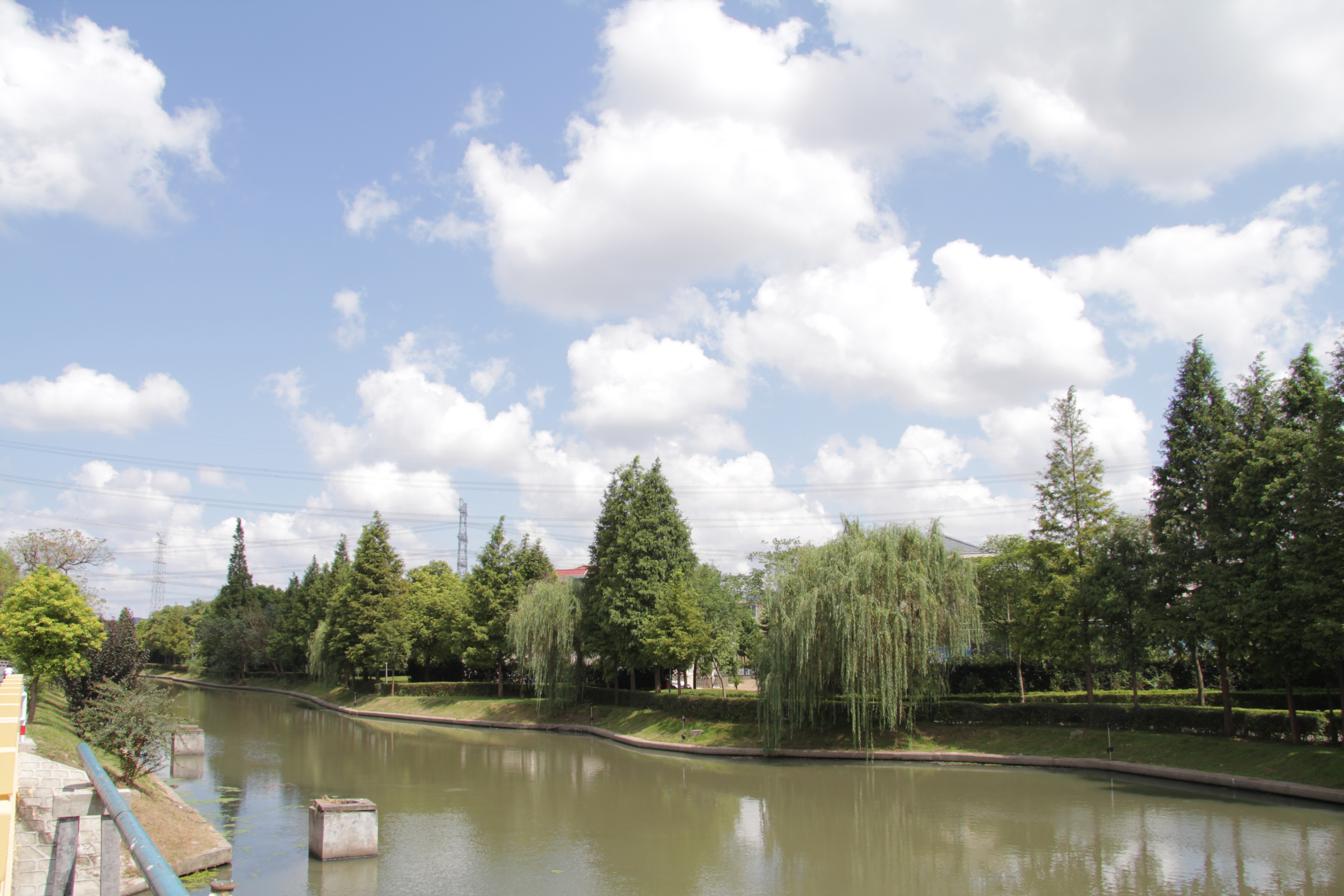
- Canals in Kangqiao at Cambridge Forest New Town
- Interactive map of Kangqiao
- Country: People's Republic of China
- Municipality: Shanghai
- Established: 1994

Government
  - Mayor: Xu Jianjun

Area
  - Total: 41.25 km^{2} (15.93 sq mi)

Population
  - Total: 174,672
  - Density: 4,234/km^{2} (10,970/sq mi)
- Time zone: UTC+8 (China Standard)
- Area code: 021

Kangqiao forms part of suburban Shanghai and has a land area of 41.25 km^{2} (15.93 sq mi) and is a subdistrict of Pudong. At the Sixth National Census the population of Kangqiao stood at 174,672.

It is mostly a residential and commercial district, though it is also home to some of the many factories and production facilities in Shanghai. The Shanghai Disney Resort is located on the outskirts of Kangqiao, and Kangqiao is also home to IKEA and the Holiday Inn Kangqiao, with a cantilevered swimming pool on the top floor.

== Education ==
International schools include:

- Nord Anglia International School Shanghai Pudong Campus.
- Shanghai Community International School.

== Residential ==
Housing compounds include;

- Emerald
- Cambridge Forest
- Tiziano
- Bellewood
- Trinity
- Forest Whisper Brook (Baoli Linyu Xi)

== Transport ==
Kangqiao is located 10 km from the city centre and is accessible via the Hunan Highway in 30 minutes.

- Shanghai Metro Line 7 reaches Fanghua Road and Longyang Road close to the Shanghai Maglev Train Terminus, both within a short distance of Kangqiao.
- Shanghai Metro Line 11 will run to East Kangqiao by the end of 2015.

== Shops & restaurants ==
In Kangqiao, businesses have been started by both Chinese nationals and foreigners. The 'Kangqiao Riviera' hosts Sebastian's French, Bakerhaus Bakery, Mata Mata Bakery and RT Mart. KFC, McDonald's, Yoshinoya are also located in Kangqiao near the Riviera.

The largest hotel in the area is the flagship Holiday Inn, with its cantilevered glass swimming pool hanging 24 stories over the street.

== Attractions ==
Kangqiao is home to the Kangqiao Taoist Temple. Built before the Sino-Japanese War, it was soon destroyed and remained this way during the Cultural Revolution. In 1993 the main hall was rebuilt, with final reconstruction taking place in 1997. Entry to the Temple costs 20RMB.

Shanghai Shenhua F.C. has its home base and training grounds in Kangqiao, on Hunan Road.

== Industry ==
Kangqiao is home to a variety of multinational companies factories. These companies include:

- Pilkington
- Aptiv
- ABB
