= Airport Link Line (Shanghai) =

Commuter rail line in Shanghai

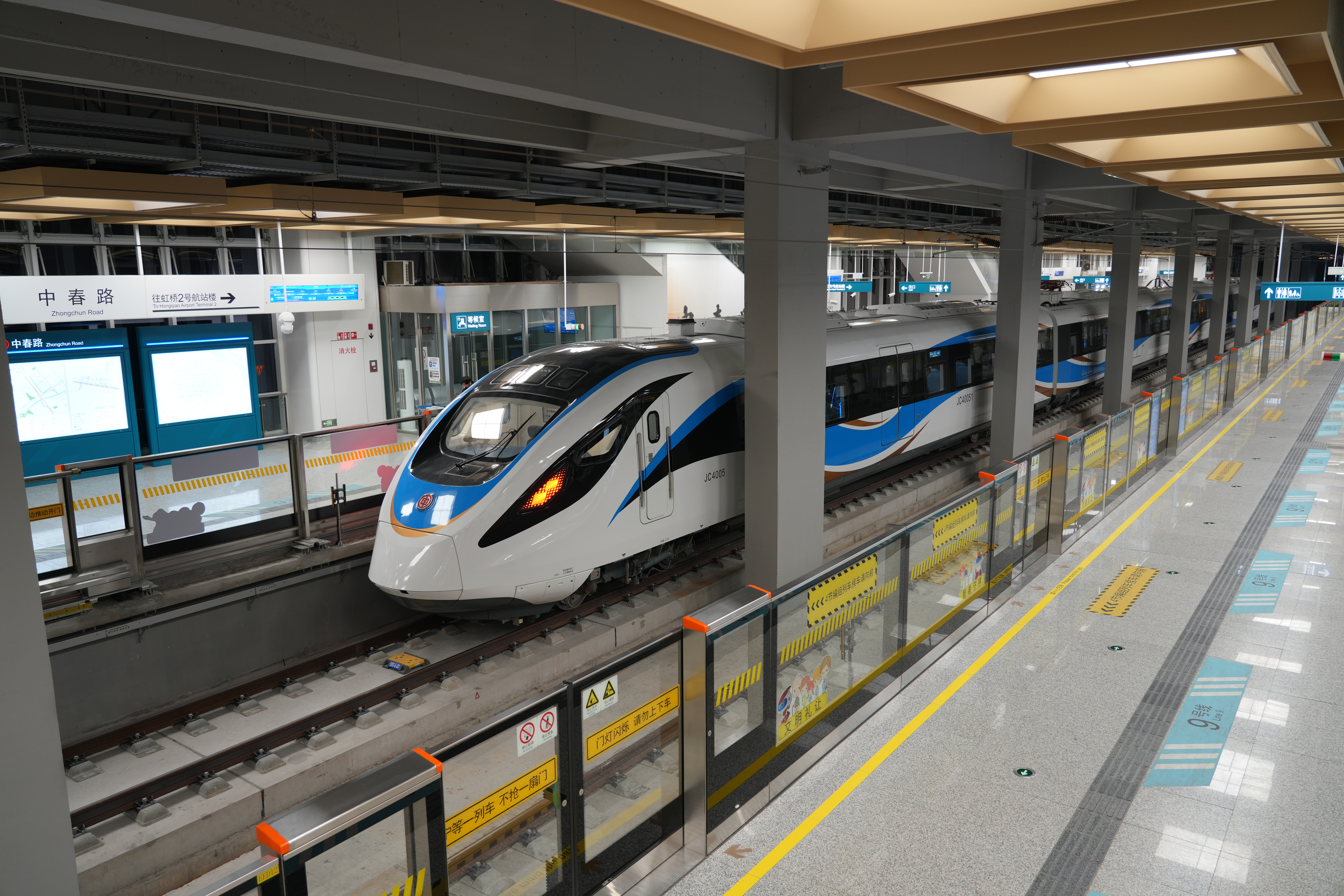
- A 4-car train at Zhongchun Road station

Overview
- Native name: 市域机场线
- Status: Completed
- Locale: Minhang, Xuhui, Pudong; Shanghai, China
- Termini: Hongqiao Airport Terminal 2; Shanghai East railway station
- Stations: 9

Service
- Type: Higher-speed rail/Airport rail link
- System: Shanghai Suburban Railway
- Operator: Shentong Metro Group
- Depot(s): Xiayan Road Depot; Shenkun Road Depot
- Rolling stock: 4-car / 8-car Class C (Express train) trains

History
- Work began: June 28, 2019; 7 years ago
- Opened: 27 December 2024; 20 months ago

Technical
- Line length: 68.6 km (42.6 mi)
- Number of tracks: 2
- Track gauge: 1,435 mm (4 ft 8 1/2 in)
- Electrification: Overhead lines (AC 25 kV)
- Operating speed: 160 km/h (99 mph)
Route map
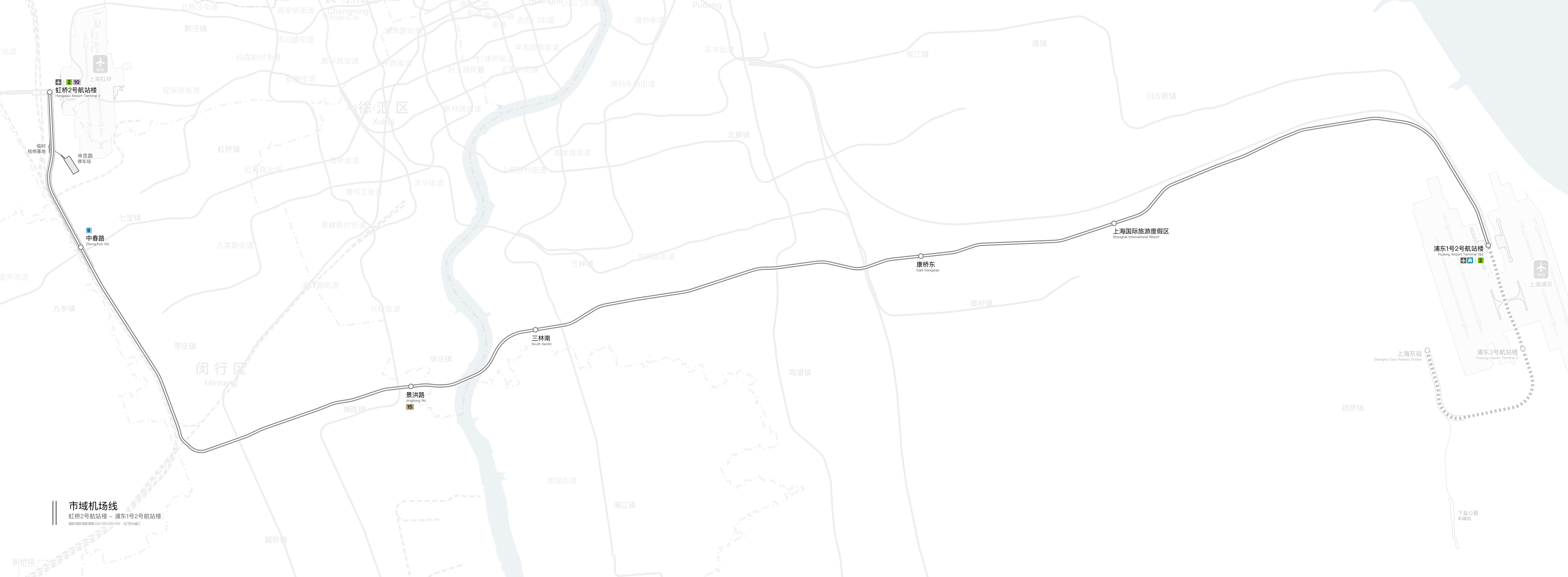

The Airport Link Line (Chinese: 市域机场线) is a commuter rail line of the Shanghai Suburban Railway, running from Hongqiao Airport Terminal 2 in Minhang District to Shanghai East railway station in Pudong. The 68.6-kilometer (42.6 mi) express line shortens the travel time between the airports of Hongqiao and Pudong from 90 minutes (by Metro Line 2) to under 40 minutes. Construction started in June 2019. The Hongqiao Airport Terminal 2 to Pudong Airport Terminal 1&2 section of the line started operations on 27 December 2024.

== Description ==
The line begins at Hongqiao Airport Terminal 2, heads south along the east side of the Shanghai-Hangzhou Passenger Dedicated Line, crosses the Shanghai-Hangzhou Railway Passage, and then turns to the east and travels along Chunshentang, 1.6 kilometers (0.99 mi) south of S20, after crossing the Huangpu River. Walk on the south side of S20 and S1, pass through Pudong International Airport, and then follow the north side of S32 into Shanghai East railway station. The line is 68.6 kilometers (42.6 mi) long, the elevated section of which is 4.313 kilometers (2.680 mi), the at-grade section 2.578 kilometers (1.602 mi), and the underground section 60.448 kilometers (37.561 mi). The project is divided into east and west construction. The west section is located in Minhang District, starting from Hongqiao Hub in the west and ending at the east end well of Huajing station in the east. It has a total investment of 9.549 billion yuan.

A large tunnel boring machine was used for construction, developed by Shanghai Tunnel Engineering Co. The shield, named Qiyue, or "swift horse", weighs around 3,200 tons and is 99 meters (325 ft) long. It has 14-meter (46 ft) diameter blades, whereas normal blades used to dig the city's metro lines are 6.9 meters (23 ft). It can dig and push 60 millimeters per minute (12 ft/h) underground.

The first section of the line opened on 27 December 2024 with seven stations in operation. Initially, passengers can only transfer without paying fares again at Zhongchun Road, from which they can travel on Line 9 and subsequently connect to other Shanghai Metro lines using the same ticket.

== Operation ==
A rail transit style service is in operation, with the platform design, train schedule, and other aspects being similar to metro lines. Customers can use public transportation cards to enter and exit the station. The interval between trains is about 15 minutes initially. First and last trains from Pudong and Hongqiao airports depart at 6 a.m. and 10 p.m. and arrive at their destination 39 minutes later. Pudong International Airport, the Resort station and the termini have platforms with lengths reserved for 16-car national railway trains while other stations can accommodate 8-car suburban railway Type C trains.

== Stations ==
=== Stopping pattern ===
- All stations: All stations from Hongqiao Airport Terminal 2 to Pudong Airport Terminal 1&2 (Future: Shanghai East railway station)
- Express: From Hongqiao Airport Terminal 2 to Pudong Airport Terminal 1&2 (Future: Shanghai East railway station), only stop at Shanghai International Resort during the journey. However, the express is only planned and won't run at the initial stage after opening until further notice.

Route		Station name		Connections	Distance km		Location
Local	Express	English	Chinese	Connections	Segment	Overall	Location
●	●	Hongqiao Airport Terminal 2	虹桥2号航站楼	Jiamin Demonstration Area (u/c, with through trains on both lines); 2 10 17 (via Hongqiao Railway Station) (Note: Out-of-system transfer with Metro and Maglev lines.); AOH; SHA	0	0	Minhang
●	|	Zhongchun Road	中春路	9	5.200	5.200	Minhang / Songjiang
●	|	Jinghong Road	景洪路	15 19 (Note: Line 19 under construction)	14.692	19.892	Minhang
●	|	South Sanlin	三林南	19	4.965	24.897	Pudong
●	|	East Kangqiao	康桥东	21 (Note: Line 21 under construction)	12.543	37.400	Pudong
●	●	Shanghai International Resort	上海国际旅游度假区		6.065	43.465	Pudong
●	●	Pudong Airport Terminal 1&2	浦东1号2号航站楼	2 Maglev; PVG	15.113	58.578	Pudong
		Pudong Airport Terminal 3	浦东3号航站楼	21 2 Maglev Nanhui (u/c, through operations); PVG (Note: All lines and connections are either planned or under construction)	3.658	62.236	Pudong
		Shanghai East Railway Station	上海东站	21 Nanhui PVG	6.444	68.680	Pudong

=== Through operations ===
- Through operations from Hongqiao Airport Terminal 2 to Chengbei Road on the Jiamin are scheduled.
- Through operations from Pudong Airport Terminal 3 to Lingang on the Nanhui are scheduled.

=== Important stations ===
In terms of operation mode, a public transit-style railway operation is adopted. The platform design, train schedule, and other aspects are similar to subways, and citizens can use the Shanghai public transport card to enter and exit the station.

Approximately 88 percent of the line will run underground while the remaining sections will be elevated. The above-ground section is between Qibao and Huajing stations. There are 7 underground stations and 2 ground level stations. It will use EMU trains with a maximum operating speed of 160 km/h (99 mph).

=== Future extensions ===
A branch line from Shanghai South Railway Station to the Airport Link Line South Sanlin Station will be constructed, so that through operations to/from Jinshan will be available.

== Technology ==
=== Rolling Stock ===
Shanghai Suburban Railway Airport link line rolling stock
Fleet numbers	Manufacturer	Time of manufac- turing	Class	No of cars	Formation (Note: TMc: Trailer car with cab and motors; Mp: car with motors and pantograph.)	Manufacturer Model	Number	Notes
80	CRRC Changchun Railway Vehicles	2023-2024	C (Express train) (Note: Class C (Express train) carriage: 24.5m in length, 3.3m in width and 3.8m in height; Capacity: about 290 people.)	4; 8	TMc+Mp+Mp+TMc; TBA	CCD2031	JC40011-JC40144 JC80011-JC80038	14 sets of 4 cars, 3 sets of 8 cars.

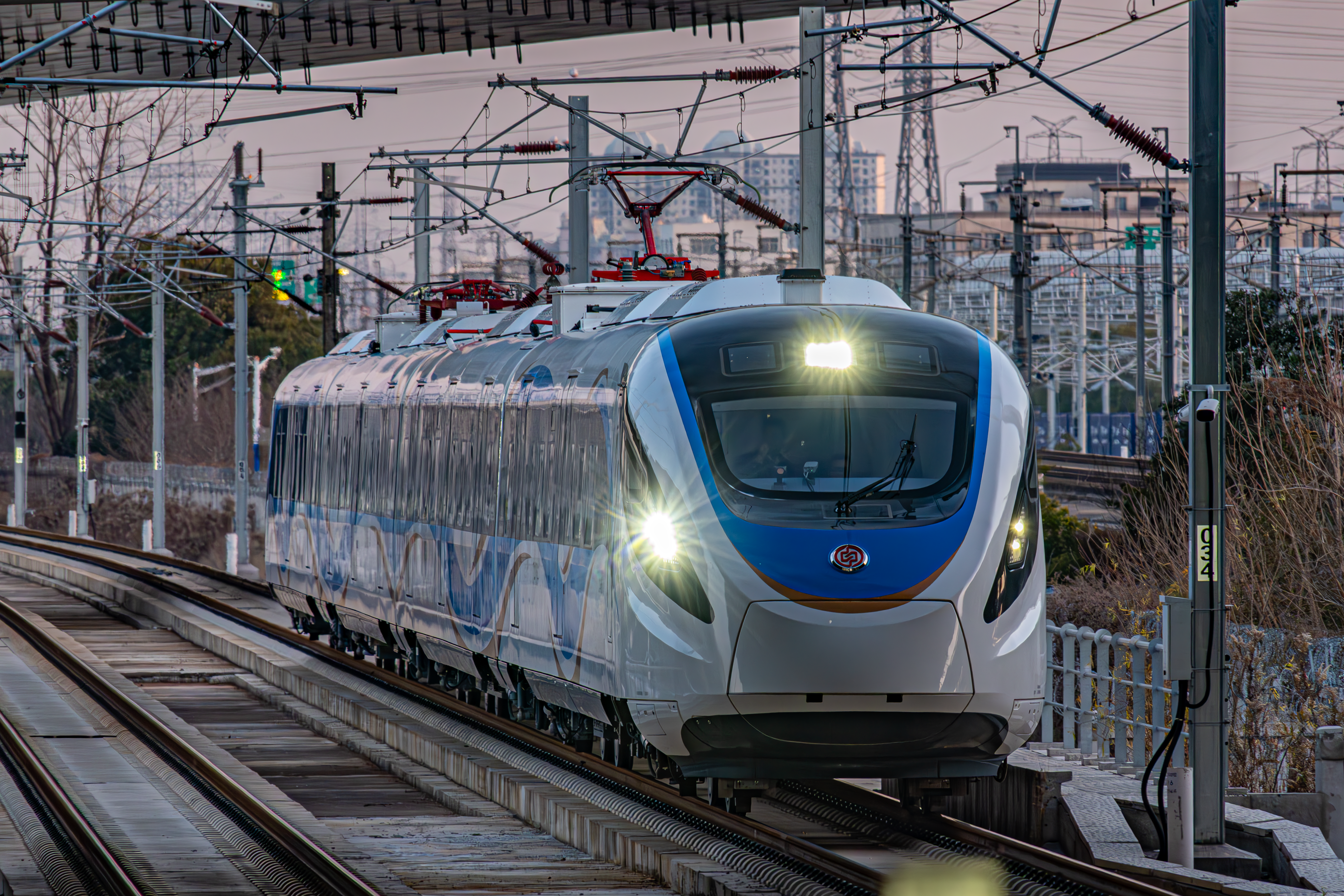
JC4001 (4-car set)

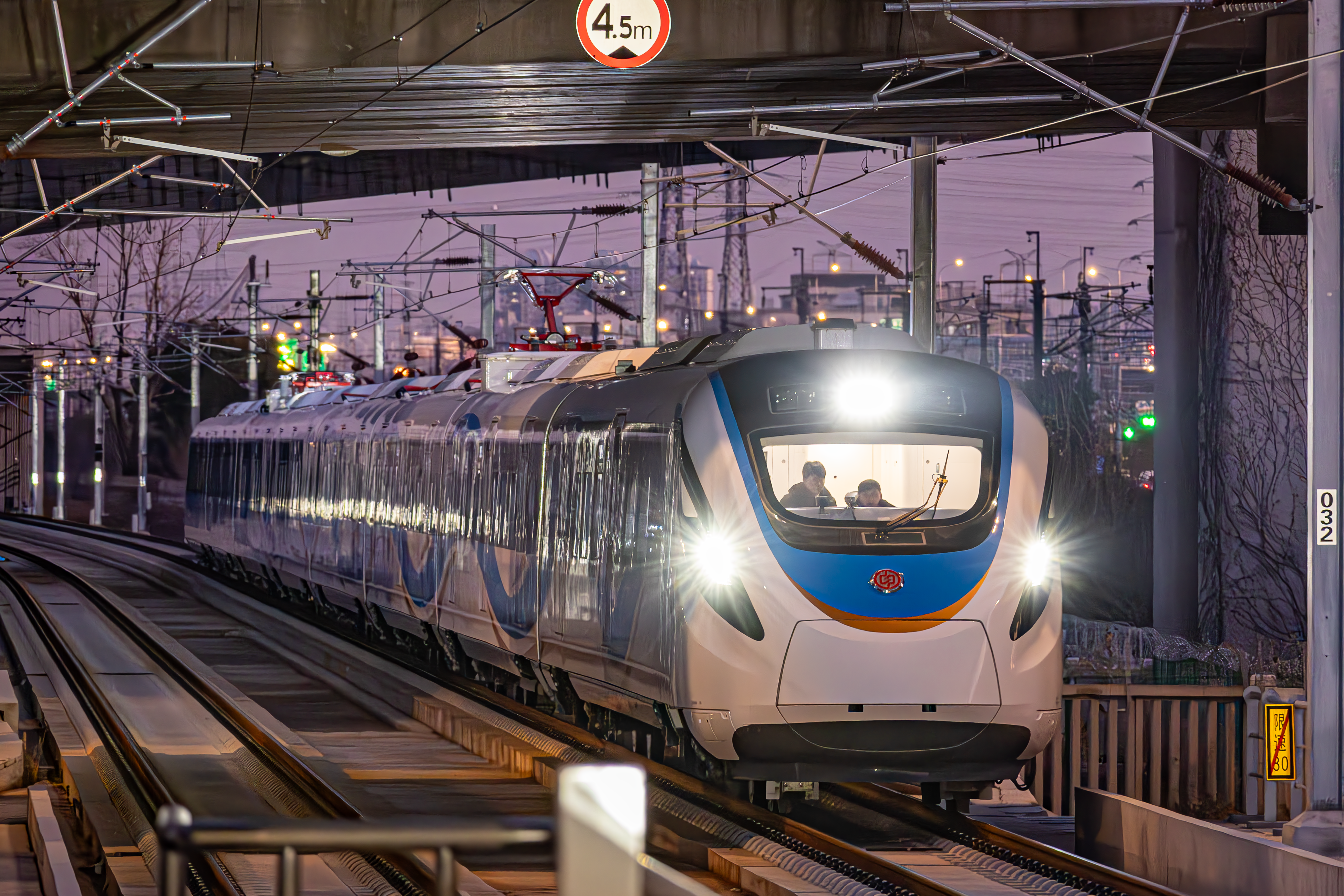
JC8001 (8-car set)
