= Shanghai East railway station =

Planned railway station

Shanghaidong 上海东站

General information
- Location: Bonded Area of Pudong International Airport, Zhuqiao Town, Pudong New District, Shanghai; China
- Coordinates: 31°07′28″N 121°46′23″E
- Operator: Shanghai Railway Bureau; China Railway Corporation
- Lines: Shanghai–Suzhou–Nantong railway; New Shanghai–Hangzhou HSR (u/c); Airport Link Line (u/c); Nanhui Line (u/c); Line 21 of the Shanghai Metro (proposed)
- Platforms: 14
- Tracks: 30 (120 pairs of trains operating daily)

Other information
- Station code: (TMIS code); (telegram code); (Pinyin code)
- Classification: Top Class station

History
- Opened: 2027 (expected)
Location
- Location within Shanghai

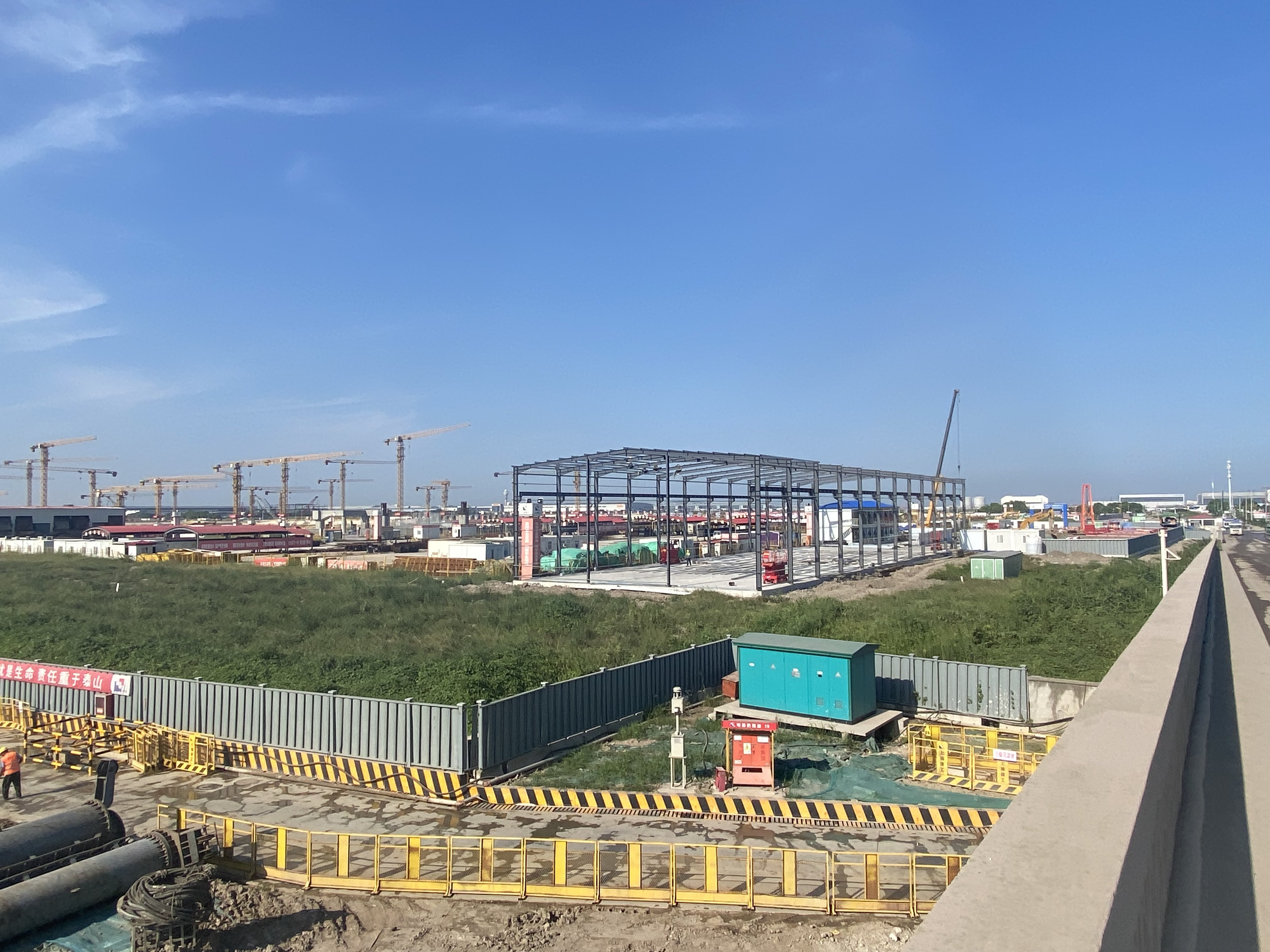
Shanghai East Railway Station under construction in August 2024.

Shanghai East railway station (simplified Chinese: 上海东站; traditional Chinese: 上海東站; pinyin: Shànghǎi Dōngzhàn) is a planned new station in the Pudong New Area of Shanghai. It will be located beside Shanghai Pudong International Airport, with which will form a future major intermodal passenger transport hub. Shanghai East Railway Station is expected to be completed and put into operation within 2027.

== Transportation ==
On December 15, 2019, construction of the second phase of the Shanghai–Suzhou–Nantong railway from Taicang to Situan began, passing through Shanghai Pudong New Area to establish Shanghai East railway station. Shanghai East railway station will be the second largest railway station in Shanghai after Shanghai Hongqiao railway station.

The first stage of the project the Airport Link line of Shanghai Metropolitan Area Intercity Railway was opened in December 2024, connecting Shanghai East railway station with Pudong Airport, Hongqiao railway station and Hongqiao Airport. The travel time between both airports has been cut from 90 minutes to less than 40 minutes.
