= Shanghai maglev train =

Railway line in Shanghai using magnetic levitation train

Coordinates: 31°12′14″N 121°33′14″E

Shanghai maglev train line

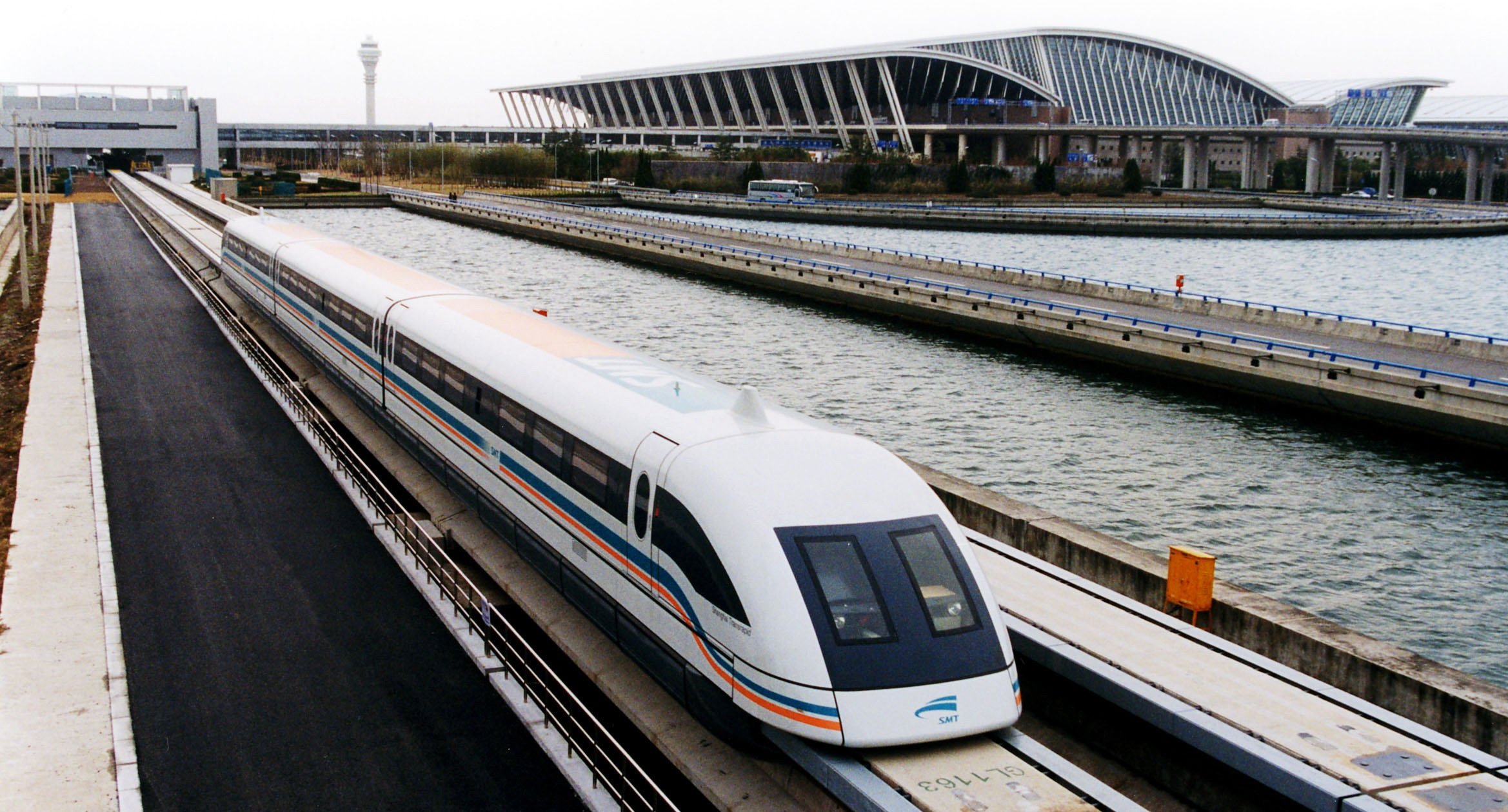
- Shanghai maglev train

Overview
- Other name(s): Shanghai Transrapid; Airport express line (with extension to Hongqiao Railway Station, not to be confused with Airport link); Shanghai–Hangzhou maglev line
- Status: Operational
- Owner: Shanghai Shentong Holdings Co., Ltd. Shenergy (Group) Co., Ltd. Shanghai International Group Co., Ltd. Shanghai Baosteel Group Co., Ltd. Shanghai Automotive Industry (Group) Co., Ltd. Shanghai Electric (Group) Co., Ltd. Shanghai Pudong Development Co., Ltd
- Locale: Pudong; Shanghai
- Termini: Longyang Road; Pudong International Airport
- Connecting lines: 2 7 16 18
- Stations: 2
- Website: www.shmetro.com www.smtdc.com/en/

Service
- Type: Maglev
- Services: Longyang Road ↔ Pudong International Airport
- Operator(s): Shanghai Maglev Transportation Development Co., Ltd.
- Depot: Shanghai Maglev Train Maintenance Base located near Pudong International Airport Station
- Rolling stock: Transrapid SMT "Electric Express"

History
- Work began: February 28, 2001; 25 years ago
- Opened: December 31, 2002; 23 years ago (preview tour only); October 10, 2003; 23 years ago (revenue service)

Technical
- Line length: 29.86 km (19 mi)
- Number of tracks: 2
- Character: Elevated
- Electrification: Magnetic levitation
- Operating speed: After May 2021: 300 km/h (186 mph); Average speed: 224 km/h (139 mph); (duration: 8 min and 10 secs); Prior to May 2021: 431 km/h (268 mph); Average speed: 249.5 km/h (155 mph); (duration: 7 min and 20 secs); Record: 501 km/h (311 mph)
- Signalling: GoA2 / STO

Chinese name
- Simplified Chinese: 上海磁浮示范运营线
- Traditional Chinese: 上海磁浮示範運營線
- Literal meaning: Shanghai Maglev Demonstration Operation Line
Transcriptions
Standard Mandarin
- Hanyu Pinyin: Shànghǎi Cífú Shìfàn Yùnyíng Xiàn
Route map
To scale geographic map:
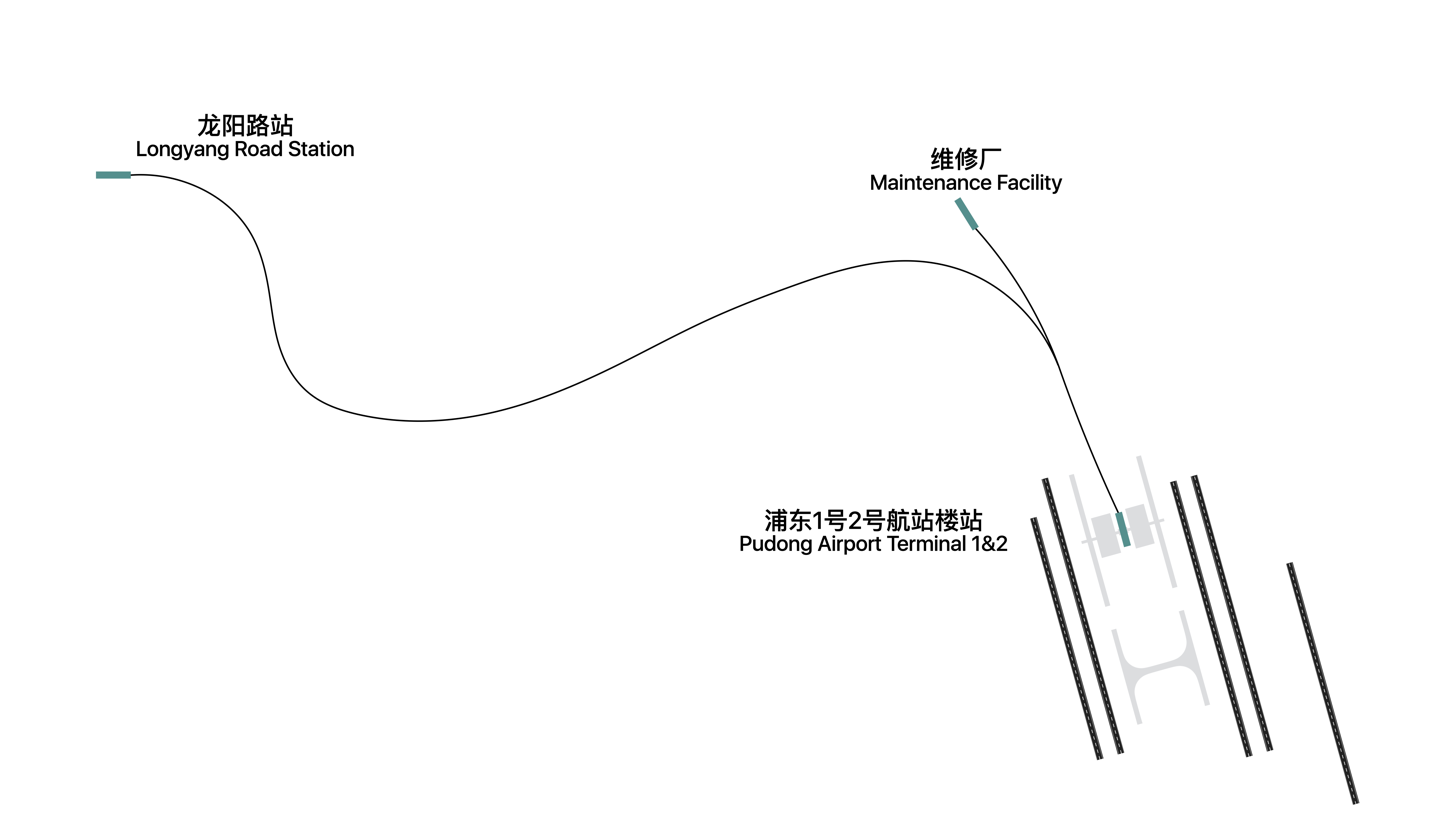
Part of a series on
Transport in Shanghai
- Roads
- Long Distance Rail
- Commuter Rail
- Maglev
- Metro
- Tram
- Trolleybus
- Bus
- Ferry
Long Distance
- Airports
  - SHA
  - PVG
- HSR
  - Huning
  - Jinghu
  - Coastal
  - Yangtze
  - Hukun
  - HuSuHu
  - HuSuTong
- Conventional Rail
  - Jinghu
  - Hukun
- Railway stations
  - Shanghai
  - Hongqiao
  - Shanghainan
  - Shanghaixi
  - Songjiang
Shanghai Suburban Railway
- Jinshan railway
- Airport Link line
Shanghai Metro
- 1 2 3 4 5 6 7 8 9 10 11 12
13 14 15 16 17 18 Pujiang
- Miscellanea
  - Trains
  - Stations
  - Timeline
Trams in Shanghai
- 1908-75
- Zhangjiang (Closed)
- Songjiang (T1
- T2)
Roads
- Municipal express roads
- Provincial expressways
- National expressways
- Yangtze River fixed crossing
Shanghai Public Transport Card

The Shanghai maglev train (SMT) or Shanghai Transrapid (Chinese: 上海磁浮示范运营线; pinyin: Shànghǎi Cífú Shìfàn Yùnyíng Xiàn; lit. 'Shanghai Maglev Demonstration Operation Line') is a magnetic levitation train (maglev) line that operates in Shanghai, China. The line uses technology developed by Transrapid, a ThyssenKrupp and Siemens joint venture. The Shanghai maglev is the world's first commercial high-speed maglev and has a maximum cruising speed of 300 km/h (186 mph). Prior to May 2021, the cruising speed was 431 km/h (268 mph), making the train service the fastest in commercial operation at the time.

The train line connects Shanghai Pudong International Airport (also on Shanghai Metro's Line 2) and Longyang Road station (in the outskirts of central Pudong district of the city, with transfers to lines 2, 7, 16, and 18), where passengers can interchange to the Shanghai Metro to continue their trip to the city center. The line is not part of the Shanghai Metro network, which operates on its own right-of-way to Pudong Airport.

The journey takes 8 minutes and 10 seconds to complete the distance of 30 km (18.6 mi). A train can reach 300 km/h (186 mph) in 2 minutes and 15 seconds, while the historical maximum operational speed of 431 km/h (268 mph) could be reached after 4 minutes.

== History ==
=== Construction ===
Construction of the line began on March 1, 2001, and public commercial service commenced on 1 January 2004. The Shanghai Transrapid project took ¥10 billion (US$1.33bn) and two and a half years to complete. The line is 30.5 km (18.95 mi) track and has a further separate track leading to a maintenance facility.

The top operational commercial speed of the Shanghai maglev was 431 km/h (268 mph), making it the world's fastest train in regular commercial service from its opening in April 2004 until its speed reduction in May 2021. During a non-commercial test run on 12 November 2003 a maglev train achieved a Chinese record speed of 501 km/h (311 mph). The Shanghai Maglev has a length of 153 metres (502 ft 0 in), a width of 3.7 metres (12 ft 2 in), a height of 4.2 metres (13 ft 9 in) and a three-class, 574-passenger configuration (End section (ES) 1st class: 56; Middle section (MS) 2nd class: 110; End section (ES) 2nd class: 78).

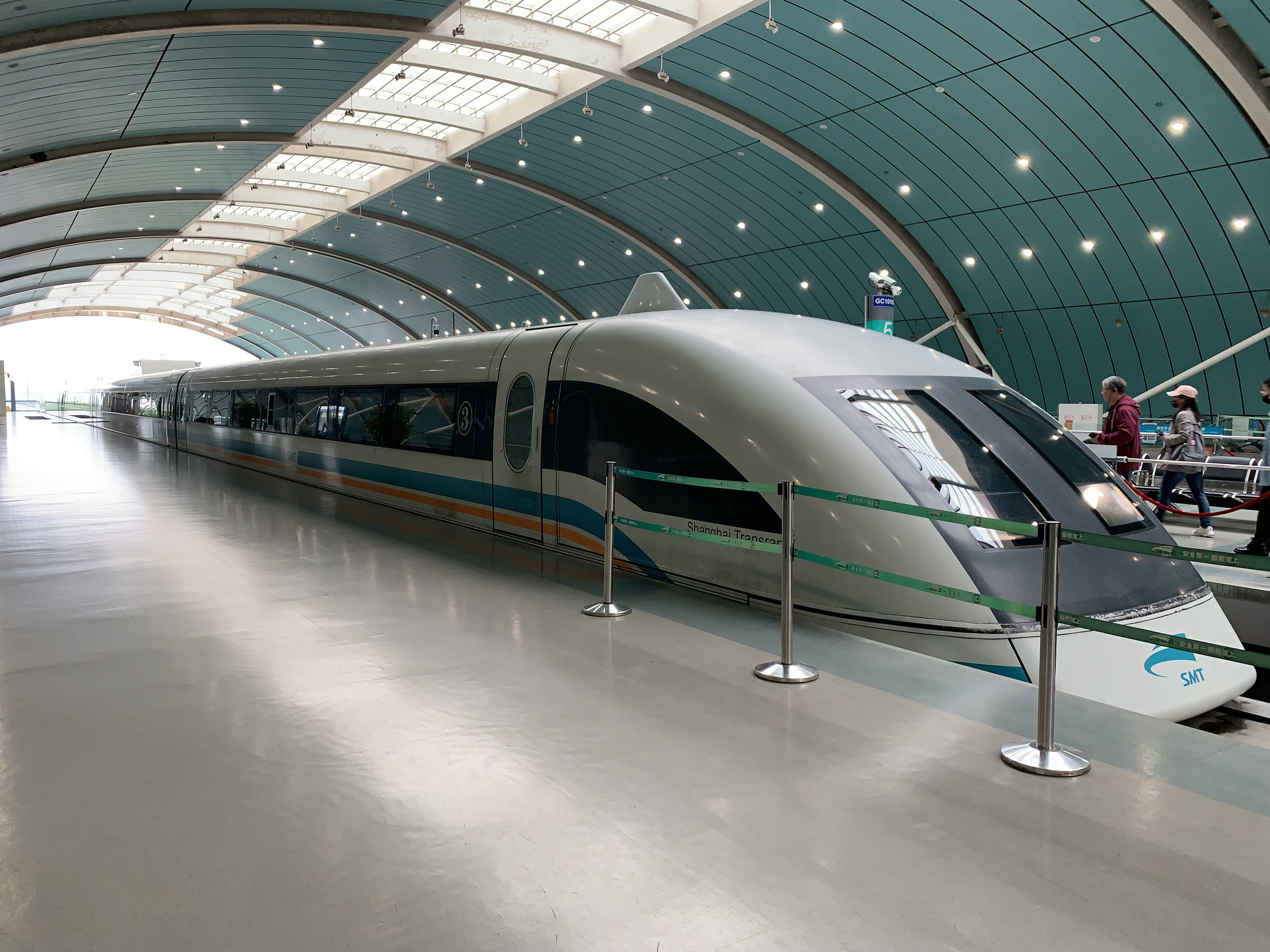
A Shanghai Maglev at Longyang Road station

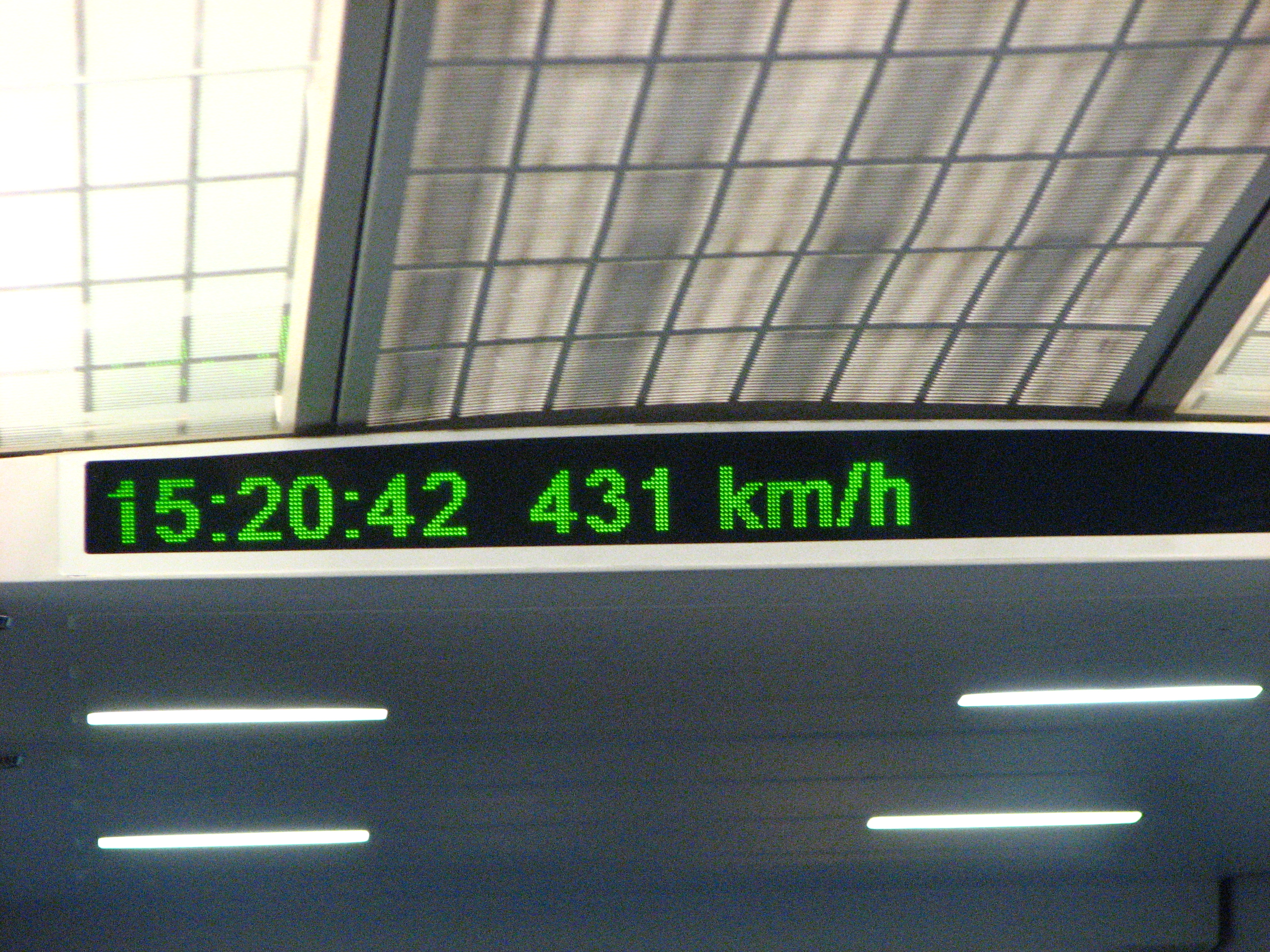
Speed indicator shown in each car

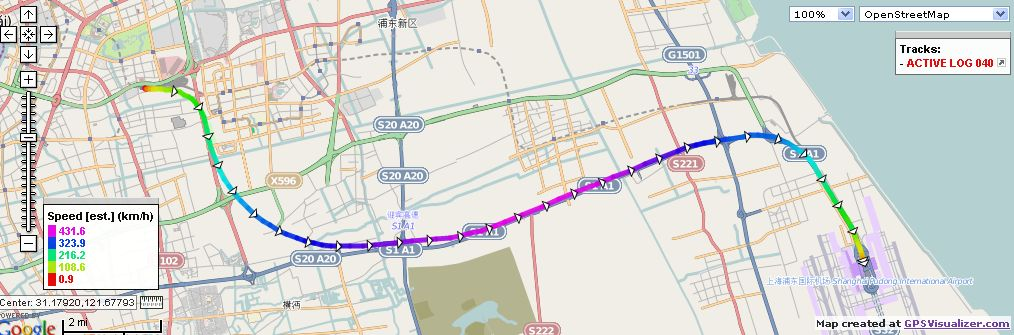
Shanghai Maglev speed

The train set model (Transrapid SMT) was built by a joint venture of Siemens and ThyssenKrupp from Kassel, Germany in 3 pieces (originally 4 pieces consisting of 6 wagons each were planned) and based on years of tests and improvements of their Transrapid maglev system, especially the Transrapid 08. The Shanghai Maglev track (guideway) was built by local Chinese companies who, as a result of the alluvial soil conditions of the Pudong area, had to deviate from the original track design of one supporting column every 50 meters (160 ft) to one column every 25 meters (82 ft), to ensure that the guideway meets the stability and precision criteria. Several thousand concrete piles were driven to depths up to 70 meters (230 ft) to attain stability for the support column foundations. A mile-long, climate-controlled facility was built alongside the line's right of way to manufacture the guideways. The train was manufactured in Germany by Siemens-Thyssenkrupp JV (Joint venture).

The electrification of the train was developed by Vahle, Inc. Two commercial maglev systems predated the Shanghai system: the Birmingham Maglev in the United Kingdom and the Berlin M-Bahn. Both were low-speed operations and closed before the opening of the Shanghai maglev train.

The train was inaugurated in December 2002 by the German chancellor, Gerhard Schröder, and the Chinese premier, Zhu Rongji. Initial opening was for tour only, providing a round trip. The train starts from Longyang Rd. Station, speed up to 431 km/h (268 mph) and arrives at Pudong Airport. After a very short break, the train returns without opening the door. The price was 150 RMB for normal seats and 300 RMB for VIP seat. The normal operation started on 10 October 2003.

Since 2010, a fourth train of Chinese production (made by Chengdou Aircraft Industries) has been added to the rolling stock. Its design slightly differs from the original Transrapid-trains: separated front lights below the shortened front-windows (instead of being placed behind the windows) and interior design.

=== Plans for a Maglev network in China ===
Hans-Dieter Bott, vice president of Siemens that won the contract to build the rail link, stated that "Transrapid views the Shanghai line, where the ride will last just eight minutes, largely as a sales tool. This serves as a demonstration for China to show that this works and can be used for longer distances, such as Shanghai to Beijing". Later, however, the decision was made to implement the Beijing–Shanghai high-speed railway with conventional high-speed technology. Plans for a shorter maglev extension from Longyang Road to Hangzhou, the Shanghai–Hangzhou maglev line, have been suspended.

Speculation that a line would be built from Shanghai to Beijing mounted in 2002. It would cover a distance of about 1,300 km (808 mi), at an estimated cost of £15.5bn. The chief executive of ThyssenKrupp, Dr Ekkehard Schulz said he was certain that not only Germany, but many countries would follow the Chinese example. The German government along with a selection of German companies sought to win more projects for their maglev technology, and highlighted that a train between Shanghai and the Chinese capital, Beijing remained a possibility. No projects have been revealed as of 2014.

In 2023 and 2024, Guangzhou proposed the Beijing-Hong Kong-Macao and Shanghai-Shenzhen-Guangzhou maglev lines, The Shanghai-Shenzhen-Guangzhou line is planned to connect with Shanghai-Hangzhou line in Ningbo railway station.

=== Plans for extensions of the Maglev line ===
In January 2006, the Shanghai–Hangzhou maglev line extension project was proposed by the Shanghai Urban Planning Administrative Bureau. The extension would continue the existing line towards Shanghai Hongqiao International Airport, running via Shanghai South railway station and the Expo 2010 site, with a possible continuation towards Hangzhou. The extension would allow transferring between the two airports—located 55 km (34 mi) apart—in approximately 15 minutes. The section between the two Shanghai airports is also referred to as Airport express line.

The plan for the extension to Hangzhou was first approved by the central government in February 2006, with a planned date of completion in 2010, to be built by Germany's Transrapid consortium (ThyssenKrupp and Siemens). Work was suspended in 2008, owing to public protests over radiation fears despite an environmental assessment by the Shanghai Academy of Environmental Sciences saying the line was safe and would not affect air and water quality, and noise pollution could be controlled. In January and February 2008, hundreds of residents demonstrated in downtown Shanghai against the line being built close to their homes. The residents were reportedly concerned about potential health hazards, noise, and loss of property value. The Shanghai scheme has a buffer zone around the track that will be 22.5 m (74 ft) wide, which compares unfavourably with German standards that require houses to be 300 m (980 ft) away from the line. Representatives of the residents filed a formal request to demonstrate with the Shanghai Public Security Bureau, which was rejected. According to China Daily, as reported on People's Daily Online 27 February 2009, the Shanghai municipal government was considering building the maglev line underground to allay the public's fear of electromagnetic pollution and the final decision on the maglev line had to be approved by the National Development and Reform commission.

The total length would have been 169 km (105 mi), of which 64 km (40 mi) would be within the City of Shanghai and 105 km (65 mi) in the province of Zhejiang. Four stations would be built: at the Expo 2010 site in east Shanghai; in south Shanghai; Jiaxing; and east Hangzhou. The proposed design speed was 450 km/h (280 mph), which would allow the train to travel the distance in just 27 minutes. The total budget of the project was to be 35 billion RMB (about US$5.0 billion as of April 2008).

Another approval was granted in March 2010, with construction to begin in late 2010. The new link was to be 199.5 km (124 mi) long, 24 km (15 mi) longer than the original plan. The top speed was expected to be 450 km/h (280 mph) but limited to 200 km/h (124 mph) in built-up areas.

In October 2010, the non-maglev Shanghai–Hangzhou High-Speed Railway was opened, bringing travelling time between the two cities down to 45 minutes. Consequently, plans for a Maglev link have been suspended again.

In 2020 and 2023, Zhejiang restarted planning for the Shanghai-Hangzhou maglev line, with an additional stop at Jiaxing North railway station.

=== Ridership ===
Following the opening, overall maglev train ridership levels were at 20% of capacity. The levels were attributed to limited operating hours, the short length of the line, high ticket prices and that it terminates at Longyang Road in Pudong – another 20 min by subway from the city centre.

- In February 2003, the Shanghai Maglev train transported 18,000 guests during the first nine days of the Lunar New Year;
- As of August 31, 2004, the total passenger capacity of Shanghai Maglev trains reached 1.45 million, and the total safe operation mileage reached 1.02 million kilometers;
- As of the end of March 2006, the cumulative safe operating mileage of Shanghai Maglev trains exceeded 2.4 million kilometers, carrying 6.23 million passengers;
- On October 1, 2007, the single-day passenger flow of Shanghai Maglev Train exceeded 20,000 for the first time; Anecdotal evidence says that the morning trains are 60-70% full each time they run;
- In 2010, due to increased tourists from World Expo 2010, the maglev had their largest passenger traffic;
- Traffic decreased significantly due to the opening of Shanghai metro line 2 east extension rail linking to Pudong Airport. Since then, annual traffic has stabilized to around 3 million in between 2011 and 2014;
- In 2014 the maglev had 6.6% sharing ratio of landside transport in Pudong International Airport, a decrease from 11.3% in 2005 (metro had a share of 33% in 2014);
- As of September 5, 2017, Shanghai Maglev trains have transported a total of 50 million passengers and safely operated 16.88 million kilometers.

== Operation ==
The line is operated by Shanghai Maglev Transportation Development Co., Ltd and runs from 06:45 to 21:42, with services every 20 minutes. Operation hours:

- Until 2005, the train ran 8:30-15:30. These hours failed to serve a high number of flights from the Pudong airport that leave and arrive early in the morning or late at night;
- Between 2005 and 2007, the operation hours were extended to 7:00-21:00;
- From October 2007, operation hours were extended to coincide with the operating hours of the Metro Line 2, 6:45-21:30. Current (2022) operating hours of line 2 are 6.30-23.00; operating hours of the maglev have not been extended.

In addition to the 57 daily two-way services, since October 2016 two additional one-way trains have been added. These depart at 10:15 pm and 10:40 pm from Pudong Airport to Longyang Road.

Interiors of a train

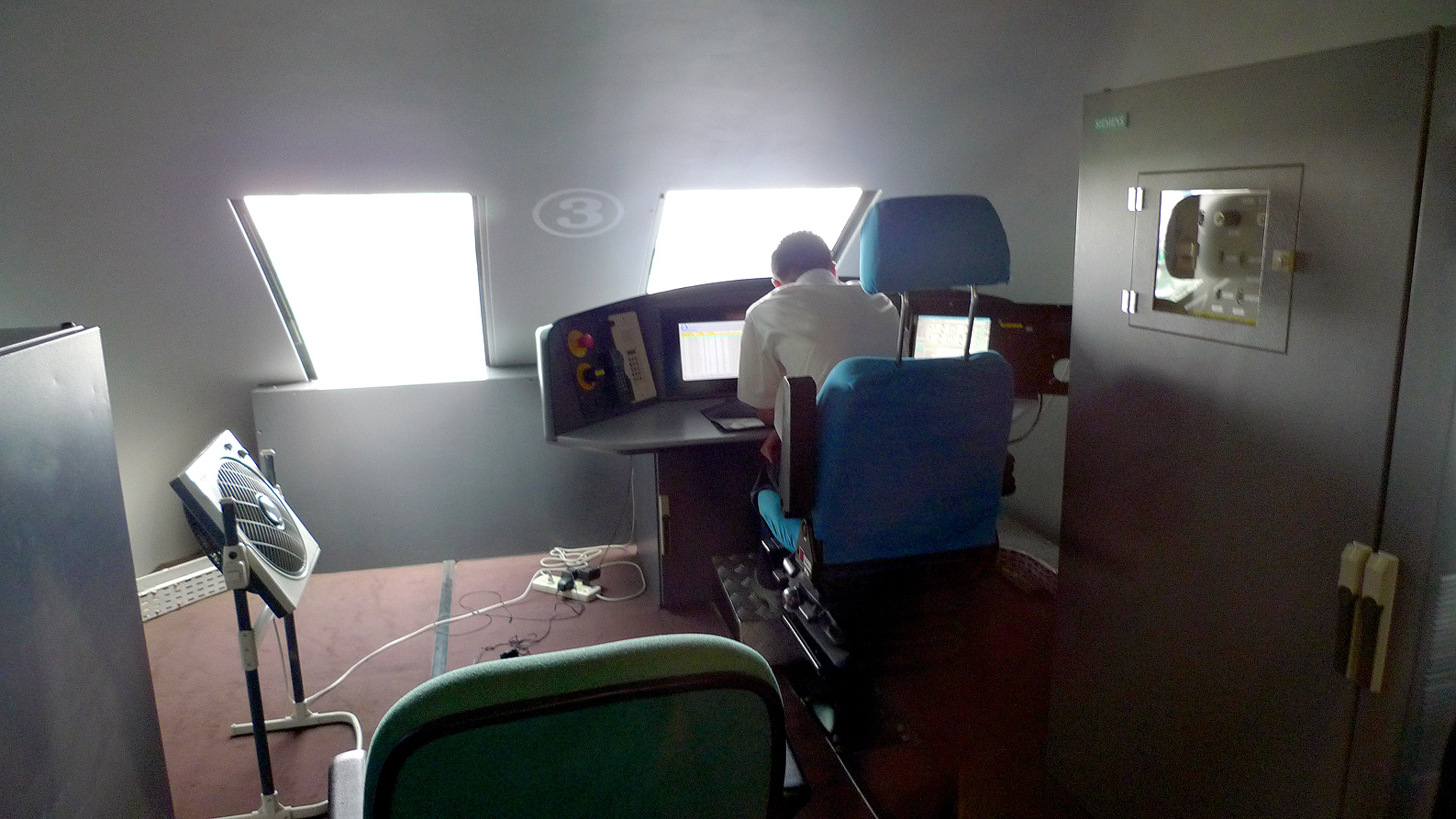
Shanghai Maglev operator in the train cabin

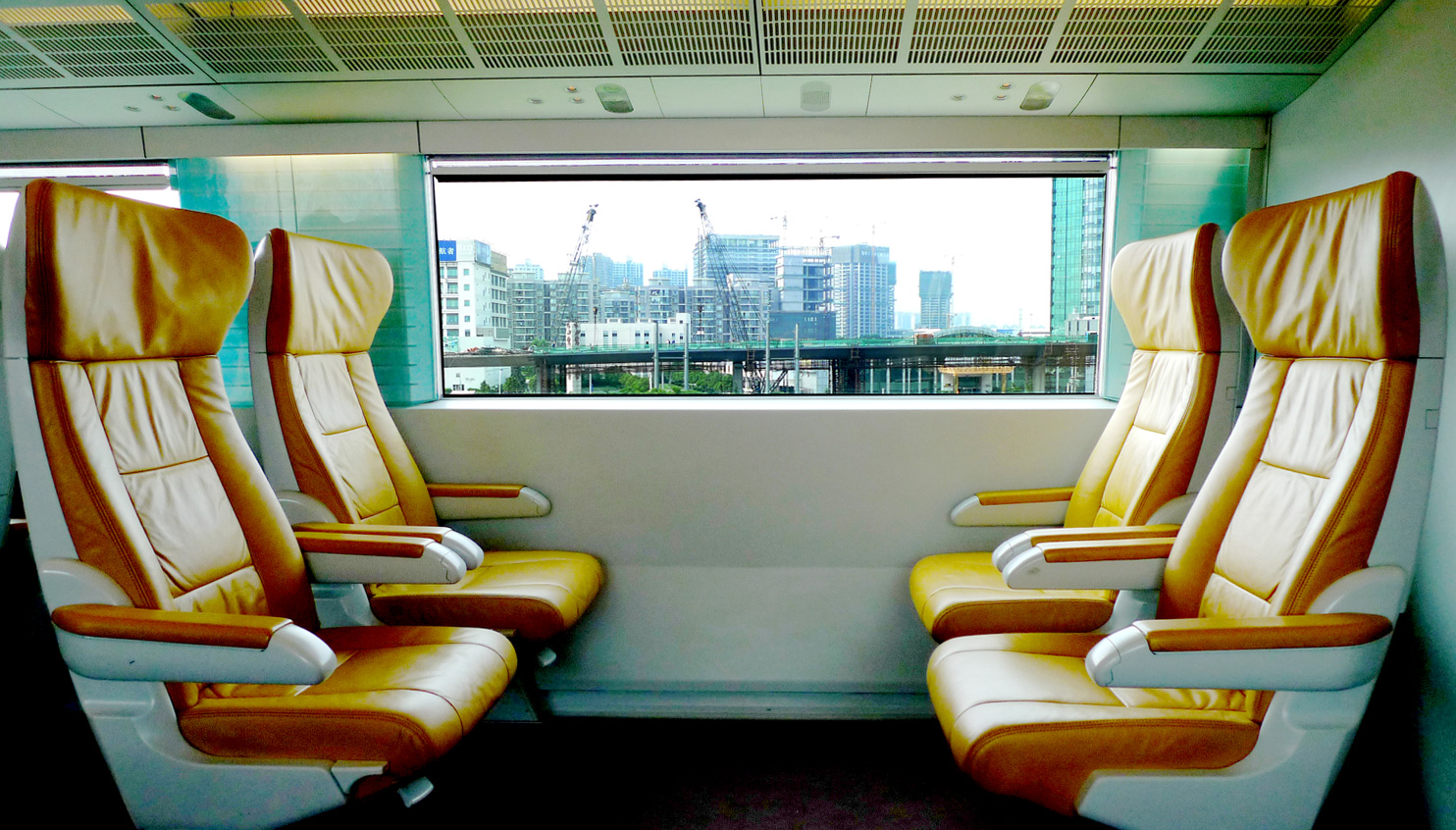
Shanghai Maglev VIP passenger interior

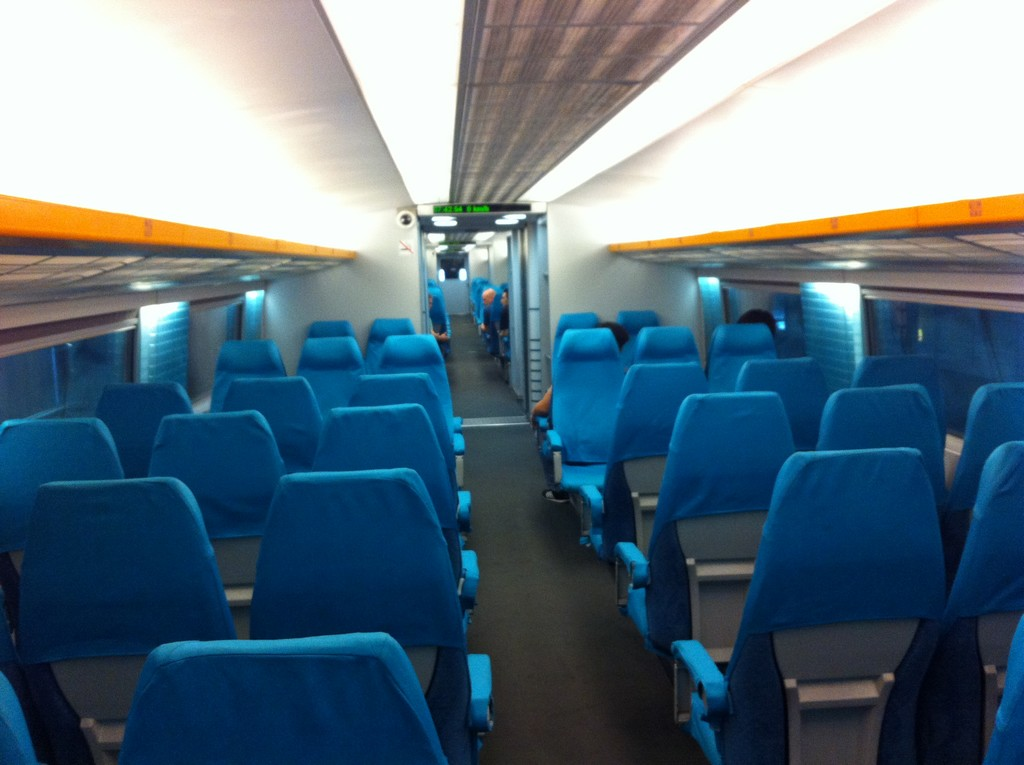
Shanghai Maglev standard passenger interior

=== Stations ===
A full trip on a train from Longyang Road Station to Pudong International Airport Station and back

Station name		Connections (out-of system)	Distance		Duration		Location	Opened	Platform
English	Chinese	Connections (out-of system)	km	mi	431km/h	300km/h	Location	Opened	Platform
Longyang Road	龙阳路	2 7 16 18	0		0m 0s		Pudong	31 December 2002	Elevated Double Side & Island
Pudong Airport Terminal 1&2	浦东1号2号航站楼 (Note: Was Pudong International Airport (浦东国际机场))	2 Airport Link	30 1/2	18.95	7m 20s	8m 10s	Pudong	31 December 2002	At-grade Side

=== Pricing ===
A one-way ticket costs ¥50 (US$8), or ¥40 ($6.40) for those passengers holding a receipt or proof of an airline ticket purchase. A round-trip return ticket costs ¥80 ($12.80) and VIP tickets cost double the standard fare. The price has not changed since the Maglev began operation.

Ticket type	Price (RMB)	Notes
Single trip ticket	50	Valid for the Ordinary single trip ticket of the day
Single trip ticket by presenting air-ticket of the same day	40	Favorable Single trip ticket for passenger who takes air plane at the same day
Single trip ticket and metro ticket	55	Subway is a one-day ticket
Round trip ticket	80	Valid for the ordinary round trip ticket in 7 days
Round trip ticket and metro ticket	85	Subway is a one-day ticket can be used separately within the validity period.
VIP single trip ticket	100	Valid for the VIP single trip ticket of the day
VIP round ticket	160	Valid for the VIP round trip ticket in 7 days

=== Operating costs ===
It cost $39.759 million per kilometer to build (10 billion yuan (1.2 billion US dollars) for the line). The line's balance of payments has been in huge deficit since its opening.

In its initial years of operation, the Shanghai Maglev Transportation Development Co. Ltd, the company that runs the line, had more than one billion RMB in losses. Nevertheless, the line's lack of profitability derives from its construction to envision the future of China's rail infrastructure, such as converting its entire high-speed rail network into maglev, rather than a viable market solution to garner a profit from travelers.

A 2007 statement by Transrapid USA said with 4 million passengers in 2006 the system was able to cover its operating costs. The ratio of costs were given as: 64%-energy, 19%-maintenance, and 17%-operations/support services; no overall amount of expenditures was given. The high proportion of energy costs was attributed to the short trip time and high operating speed. According to Chinese media's report, however, due to the huge costs of operating and the lack of the passenger flow, Shanghai Maglev Transportation Company would lose 500 million to 700 million RMB every year.

=== Incidents ===
On August 11, 2006, at 14:40, a Maglev train compartment caught fire after leaving Pudong International Airport. There were no injuries or fatalities aboard. Electrical problems caused the fire according to investigation reports.

On 14 February 2016, the Shanghai maglev line had an equipment failure that affected operation for more than 1 hour. Due to the use of single-line operation during this time, the train interval was extended.

=== Speed reductions ===
At launch the Shanghai Maglev had a cruising speed of 431 km/h (268 mph), this was later reduced to 300 km/h (186 mph) during most of the day, before being reduced to 300 km/h (186 mph) at all times.

== Shanghai Maglev Museum ==
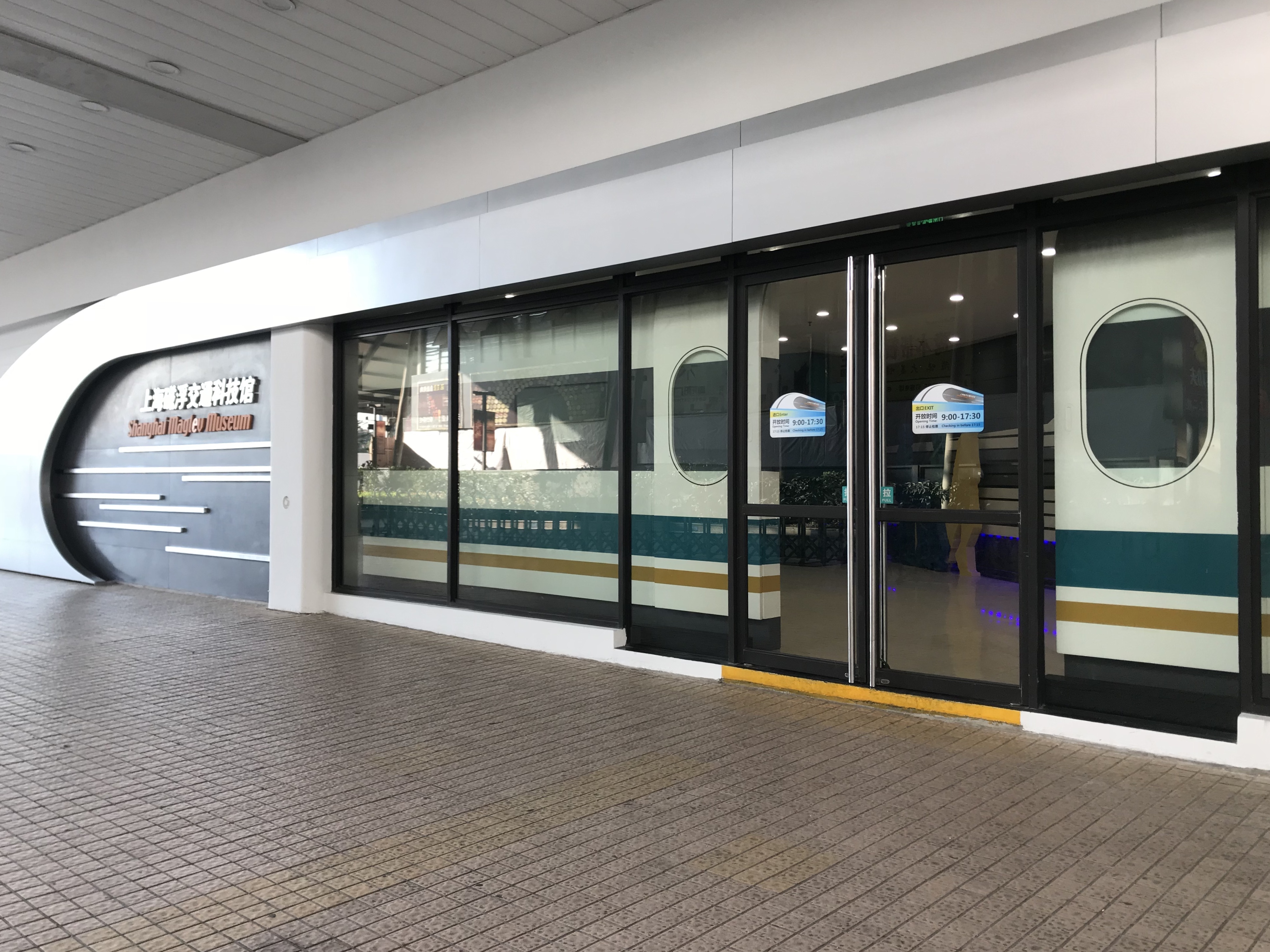
Entrance

Maglev Longyang Road Station offers Shanghai Maglev Transportation Science and Technology Museum, located at 2100 Longyang Road, Pudong New Area (Shanghai Maglev Train Longyang Road Station ground floor). Opened on August 16, 2007, it showcases Shanghai Maglev related content with an exhibition space of 1250 square meters, containing most of the history and technology of maglev train. The museum is composed of five sections:

- "Birth of the Maglev" describes how the maglev technologies were started. It includes models of the first maglevs.
- "Maglev Shanghai Line" describes the history of the Shanghai Maglev. Many models are located in this section.
- "Maglev Technology" describes the modern technology of the maglev.
- "Maglev Superiorities" describes the advantages of the maglev.
- "Prospects For The Maglev" describes the future of the maglev. The interactive Transrapid Assemble Game and Cycling are located in this exhibit.

== See also ==
- Urban rail transit in China
