= Hongqiao Airport Terminal 2 station =

Shanghai Metro interchange station

Hongqiao Airport Terminal 2 虹桥2号航站楼
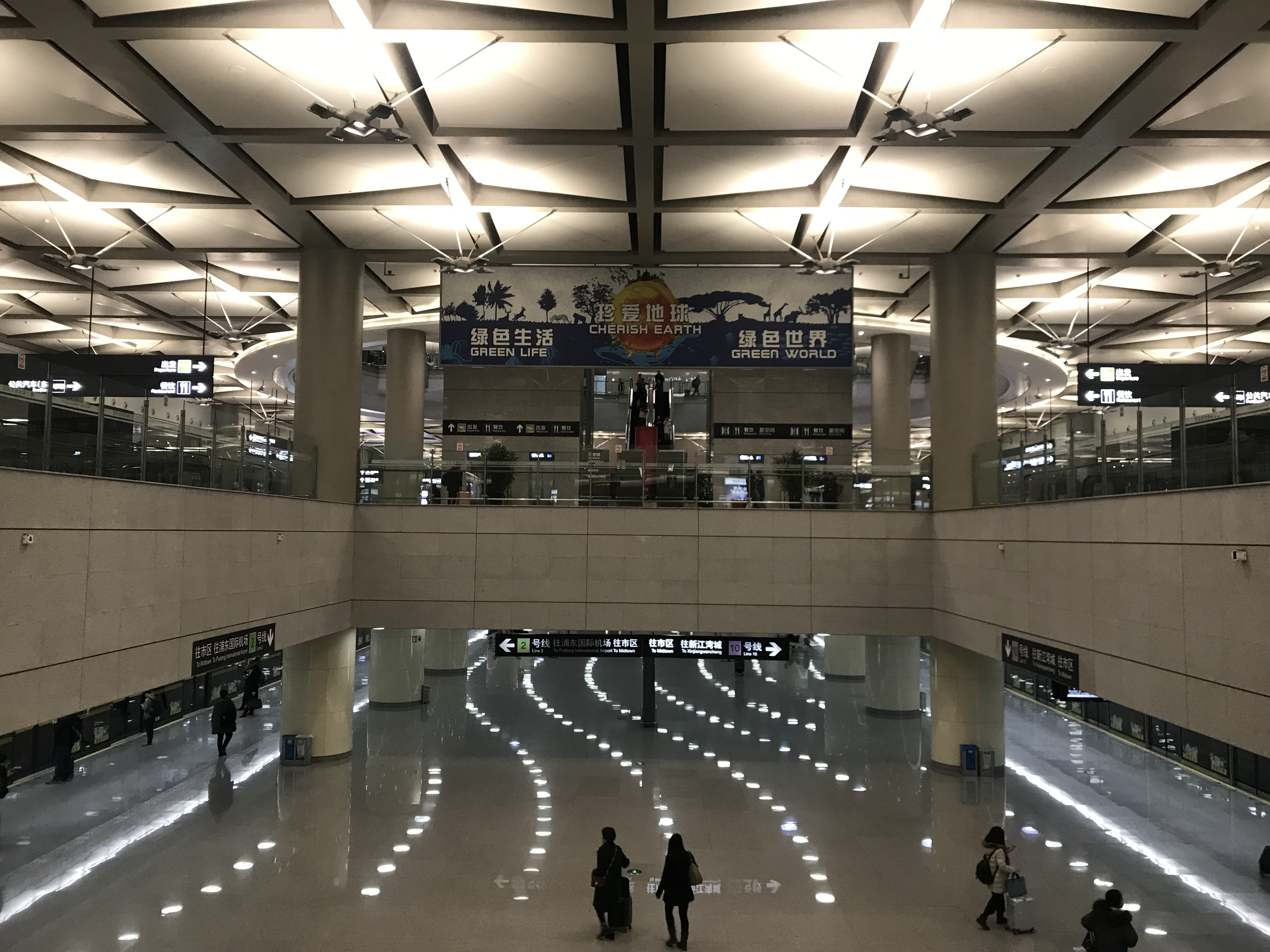
- The revamped platform for the L2/10 trains bound for downtown Shanghai

General information
- Location: Hongqiao transportation hub, Minhang District, Shanghai; China
- Coordinates: 31°11′38″N 121°19′35″E
- Operator: Shanghai No. 1/2 Metro Operation Co. Ltd.; Shanghai Suburban Railway
- Lines: Line 2; Line 10; Airport Link Line
- Platforms: 6 (3 island platforms)
- Tracks: 4
- Connections: Hongqiao Airport (SHA)

Construction
- Structure type: Underground
- Accessible: Yes

Other information
- Station code: L02/28 (Line 2) L10/02 (Line 10)

History
- Opened: 16 March 2010 (Line 2); 30 November 2010 (Line 10); 27 December 2024 (Airport Link Line)

Services
Preceding station	Shanghai Metro	Following station
Hongqiao Railway Station towards Panxiang Road · Shanghai National Accounting Institute	Line 2	Songhong Road towards Pudong Airport Terminal 1&2
Hongqiao Railway Station Terminus	Line 10	Hongqiao Airport Terminal 1 towards Jilong Road
Preceding station	Shanghai Suburban Railway	Following station
Terminus	Airport Link Line	Zhongchun Road towards Pudong Airport Terminal 1&2
Location
- Location within Shanghai

Hongqiao Airport Terminal 2 (Chinese: 虹桥2号航站楼; pinyin: Hóngqiáo Èrhào Hángzhànlóu) is an interchange station between Line 2 and Line 10 of the Shanghai Metro. The Line 2 portion opened on 16 March 2010, and the Line 10 part opened on 30 November 2010.

The metro station is located near both Terminal 2 of Hongqiao International Airport and the high-speed Shanghai Hongqiao railway station, the latter which opened on 1 July 2010.

This station is a transit-card only transfer station for transferring between Hongqiao Railway Station-bound Line 10 trains and Panxiang Road-bound Line 2 trains. Passengers using a Shanghai Public Transport Card (SPTC), T-Union Card or mobile phone QR-code can transfer within 30 minutes at no additional charge, while passengers using a single journey ticket must pay an additional fare as re-buying the ticket is required.

The new platform that opened on 30 December 2017 allows for a cross-platform interchange between Line 2 Pudong International Airport-bound trains and Line 10 Jilong Road-bound trains; passengers may transfer without leaving the platform.

== Station layout ==
4F	Relax area and lounges
3F	Departures level	Check-in area, security screening, access to gates and concessions
2F	Arrivals level	Find also here the Transfer Hall
1F	Arrivals level	baggage claiming and access to transportation: Bus, Metro and transportation hub
B1	Westbound	← 2 towards Panxiang Road · Shanghai National Accounting Institute (following station: Hongqiao Railway Station)
B1	Island platform, doors open on the left (Virtual Interchange)
B1	Eastbound	2 towards Pudong Airport Terminal 1&2 (following station: Songhong Road) →
B1	Island platform, doors open on both sides (cross-platform interchange)
B1	Eastbound	10 towards Jilong Road (following station: Hongqiao Airport Terminal 1) →
B1	Island platform, doors open on the right (Virtual Interchange)
B1	Westbound	← 10 towards Hongqiao Railway Station (following station: Hongqiao Railway Station)
