= Shanghai Suburban Railway =

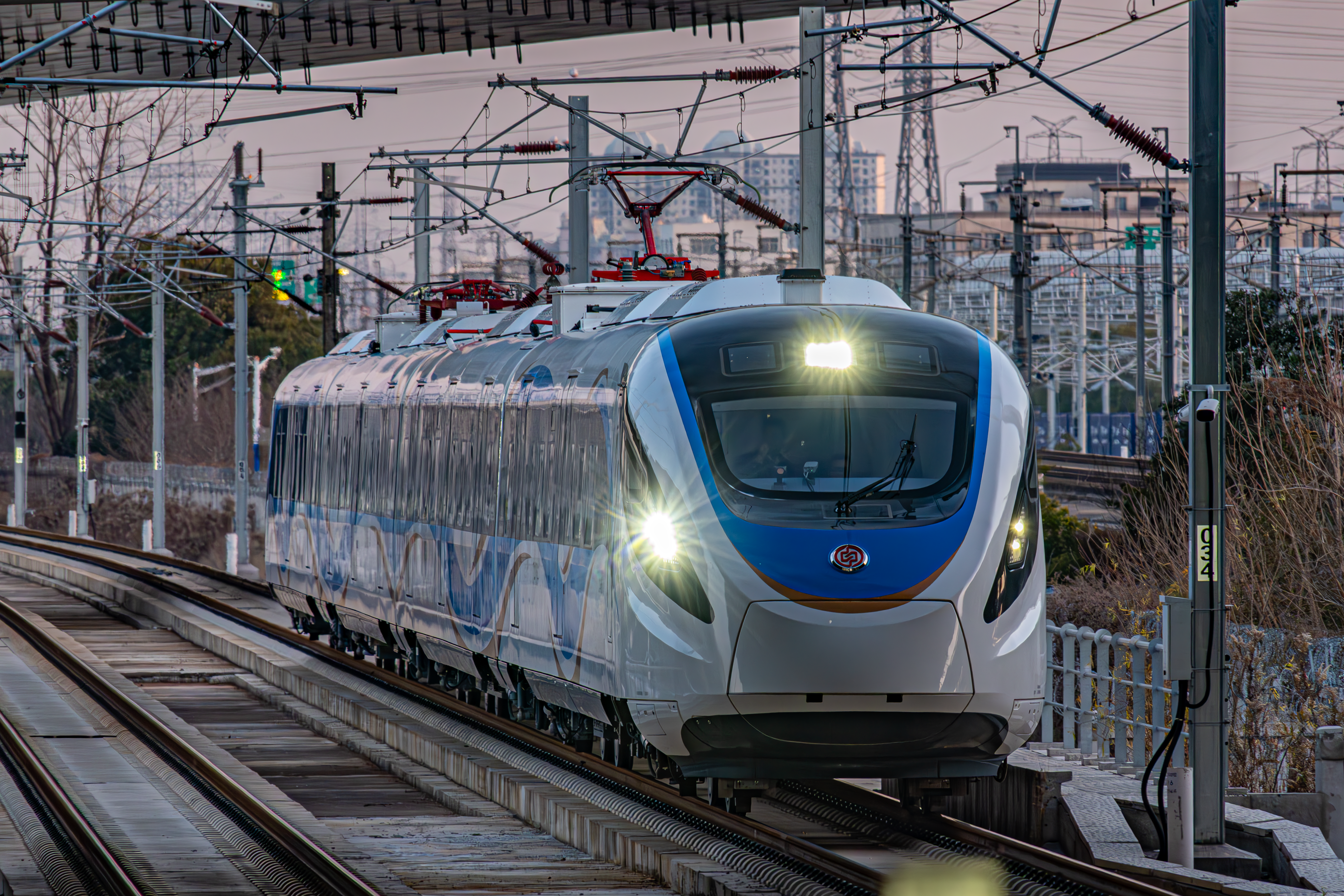
- A 4-car CCD2031 train on the Airport Link Line

Overview
- Locale: Shanghai
- Transit type: Commuter rail
- Number of lines: 2 in operation, ~13 under construction or in planning

Operation
- Began operation: 28 September 2012; 14 years ago
- Operators: China Railway Shanghai Group; Shentong Metro Group

Technical
- Track gauge: 1,435 mm (4 ft 8 1/2 in) standard gauge
- Electrification: AC 25 kV overhead lines
System map
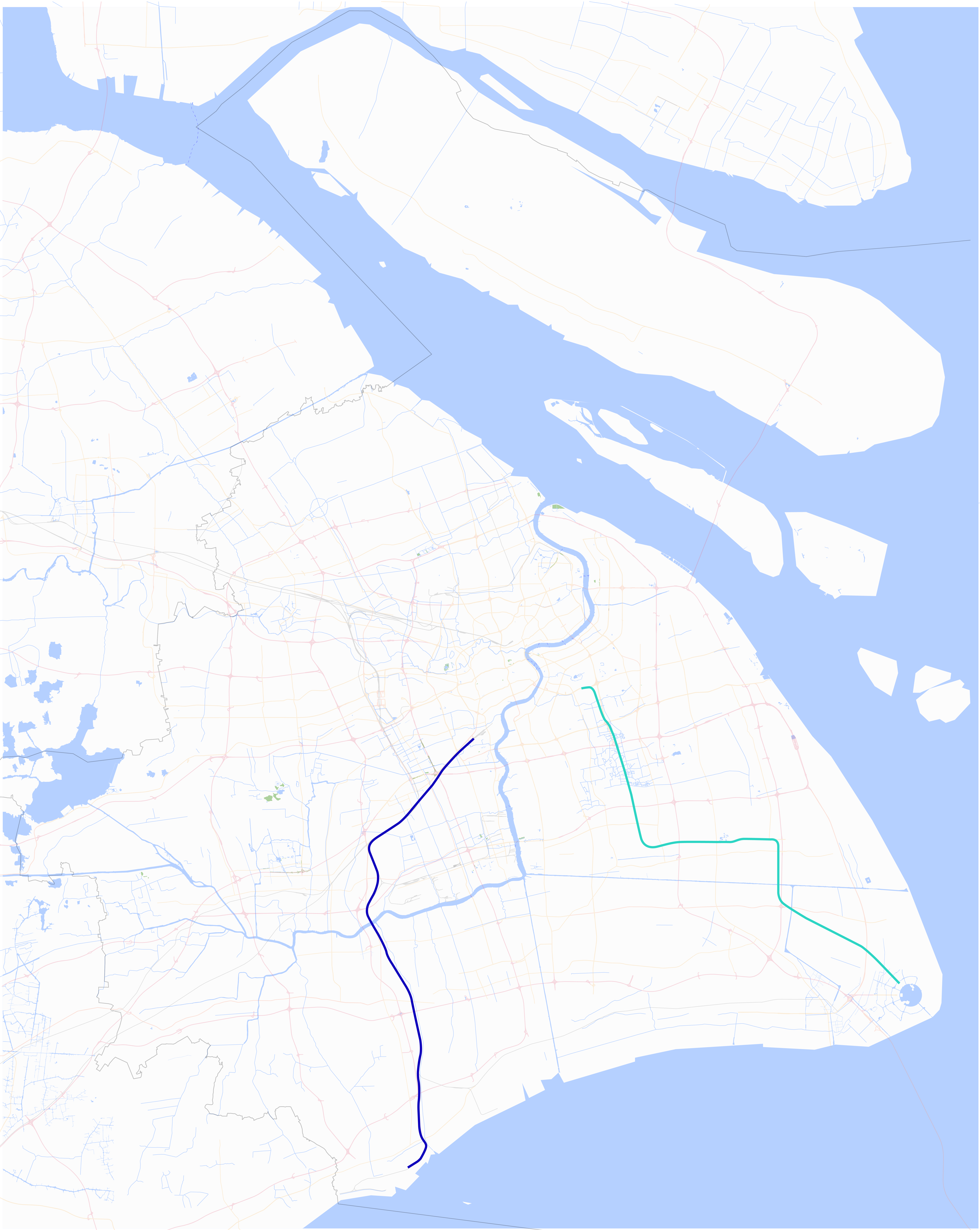
Part of a series on
Transport in Shanghai
- Roads
- Long Distance Rail
- Commuter Rail
- Maglev
- Metro
- Tram
- Trolleybus
- Bus
- Ferry
Long Distance
- Airports
  - SHA
  - PVG
- HSR
  - Huning
  - Jinghu
  - Coastal
  - Yangtze
  - Hukun
  - HuSuHu
  - HuSuTong
- Conventional Rail
  - Jinghu
  - Hukun
- Railway stations
  - Shanghai
  - Hongqiao
  - Shanghainan
  - Shanghaixi
  - Songjiang
Shanghai Suburban Railway
- Jinshan railway
- Airport Link line
Shanghai Metro
- 1 2 3 4 5 6 7 8 9 10 11 12
13 14 15 16 17 18 Pujiang
- Miscellanea
  - Trains
  - Stations
  - Timeline
Trams in Shanghai
- 1908-75
- Zhangjiang (Closed)
- Songjiang (T1
- T2)
Roads
- Municipal express roads
- Provincial expressways
- National expressways
- Yangtze River fixed crossing
Shanghai Public Transport Card

Shanghai Suburban Railway
- Simplified Chinese: 上海市域铁路
- Traditional Chinese: 上海市域鐵路
Transcriptions
Standard Mandarin
- Hanyu Pinyin: Shànghǎi Shìyù Tiělù

The Shanghai Suburban Railway (Chinese: 上海市域铁路; pinyin: Shànghǎi Shìyù Tiělù; Shanghainese: Zaon^{6}he^{5} Zy^{6}yoq^{8} Thiq^{7}lu^{6}) is a regional commuter rail network in Shanghai, China, with lines radiating from and surrounding the city's central districts. The system is planned to gradually implement regional rail services across the metropolitan area, and will eventually connect with the Jiangsu Yangtze MIR and Hangzhou Greater Bay Area network in neighboring Jiangsu and Zhejiang provinces.

== Overview ==
Shanghai Suburban Railway
Opened lines (115 km, 15 stations)
Line	Termini		Opened	Latest extension	Length (km)	Stations	Operator	Investment
Jinshan 金山线	Shanghai South	Jinshanwei	2012	N/A	56.4	8	China Railway Shanghai Group	¥4.8 billion
Airport Link 机场联络线	Hongqiao railway station	Pudong Airport Terminal 1&2	2024	N/A	58.578	7	Shentong Metro Group	¥48.054 billion
Under construction (147km, 29 stations)
Line	Termini		Commencement	Expected opening	Length (km)	Stations	Operator	Investment
Nanhui 南汇线	Lingang Open Area	Shanghai East railway station; Pudong International Airport T3 Terminal	January 2022	2026	27.88	6	Shentong Metro Group	¥11.2 billion
Jiamin 嘉闵线 (Shanghai section)	Yindu Road	Chengbei Road	August 2023	2027	44.179	15	Shentong Metro Group	¥25.6 billion
Jiamin (Taicang section)	Chengbei Road	Taicang	June 2021	before 2035	10	5	Shentong Metro Group	¥25.6 billion
Demonstration Area 示范区线 (Shanghai-Suzhou-Jiaxing Intercity Railway Shanghai Section 沪苏嘉线上海段)	Fangle Road	Shuixiangketing	July 2022	2028	56.415	10	Shentong Metro Group	¥22 billion
Nanfeng 南枫线	Lingang New Area	Fengjing	December 2023	2030	95.6	15	Shentong Metro Group	¥28 billion
Planned lines (short term)
Line	Termini		Commencement	Expected opening	Length (km)	Stations	Operator	Investment
Fengxian 奉贤线	South Sanlin	Fengxian		before 2035	37	9	Shentong Metro Group	¥15 billion
Huzhahang 沪乍杭线	Jinshan Yuanqu	Situan		before 2035			Shentong Metro Group

== Routes ==
=== Operational lines ===
- Jinshan railway (Operated by China Railway Shanghai Group)
- Airport Link (Operated by Shentong Metro Group)

=== Lines under construction ===
Planned map of Shanghai Metropolitan Area Intercity Railway System in 2027.

- Jiamin line (嘉闵线) (Construction started on 28 June 2021, opening in 2027)
- Nanhui line (南汇线) (construction started on 4 January 2022, opening in 2025)
- Demonstration Area line (示范区线) (construction started on 13 July 2022, opening in 2028)
- Nanfeng line (南枫线) (construction started on 28 December 2023, open year undetermined)

=== Planned lines ===
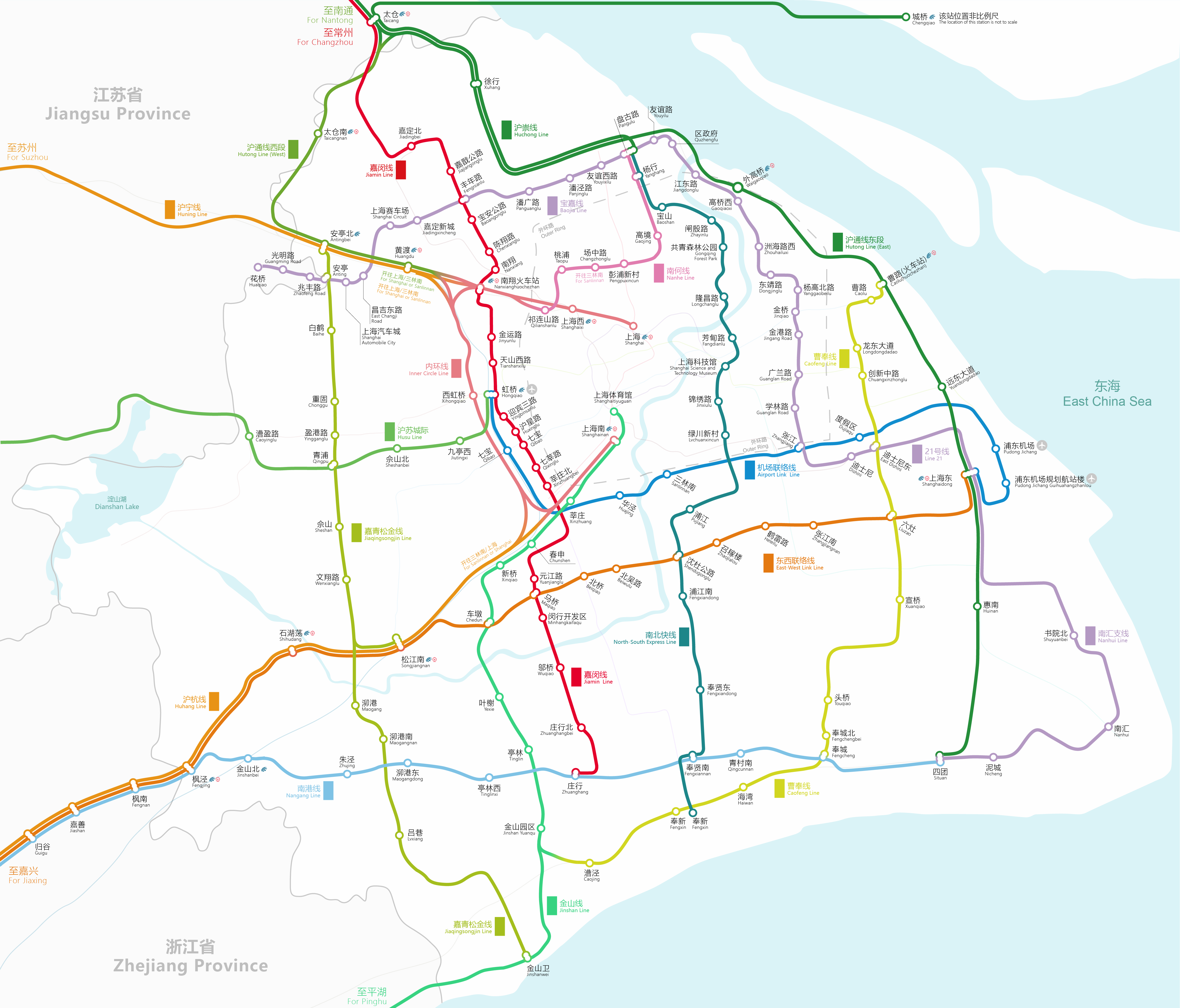
Shanghai Metropolitan Area Intercity Railway plan for 2035

- Fengxian line (奉贤线)
- Jiaqingsongjin line (嘉青松金线)
- Baojia line (宝嘉线)
- Caofeng line (曹奉线)
- East West Link line (东西联络线)
- Pudong railway (浦东铁路) (currently only freight single track non-electrified line, closed for passenger service, maybe rebuild as Huzhahang line (沪乍杭线))

On 2 July 2021, the National Development and Reform Commission issued a notice on the issuance of the "Multi-level Rail Transit Plan in the Yangtze River Delta Region". The plan proposed that by 2025, the Yangtze River Delta on the track will be basically completed. The operating mileage of arterial railways is about 17,000 kilometers, of which high-speed railways are about 8,000 kilometers, forming a three-hour inter-regional traffic circle between the Yangtze River Delta and neighboring urban agglomerations and provincial capitals. The operating mileage of intercity railways is about 1,500 kilometers, and the intercity traffic circle between neighboring big cities in the Yangtze River Delta and Shanghai, Nanjing, Hangzhou, Hefei, Ningbo and surrounding cities forms a 1-1.5 hour intercity traffic circle. The operating mileage of urban (suburban) railways is about 1,000 kilometers. The Shanghai metropolitan area and the Nanjing, Hangzhou, Hefei, and Ningbo metropolitan areas form a 0.5-1 hour commuting traffic circle.
