= Jinjiang Park =

Jinjiang Park may refer to:

- Jinjiang Action Park, an amusement park in Shanghai, China
- Jinjiang Park (Shanghai Metro), a train station
