= Xinzhuang railway station (Shanghai) =

Railway station in Minhang, Shanghai, China

Xinzhuang 莘庄
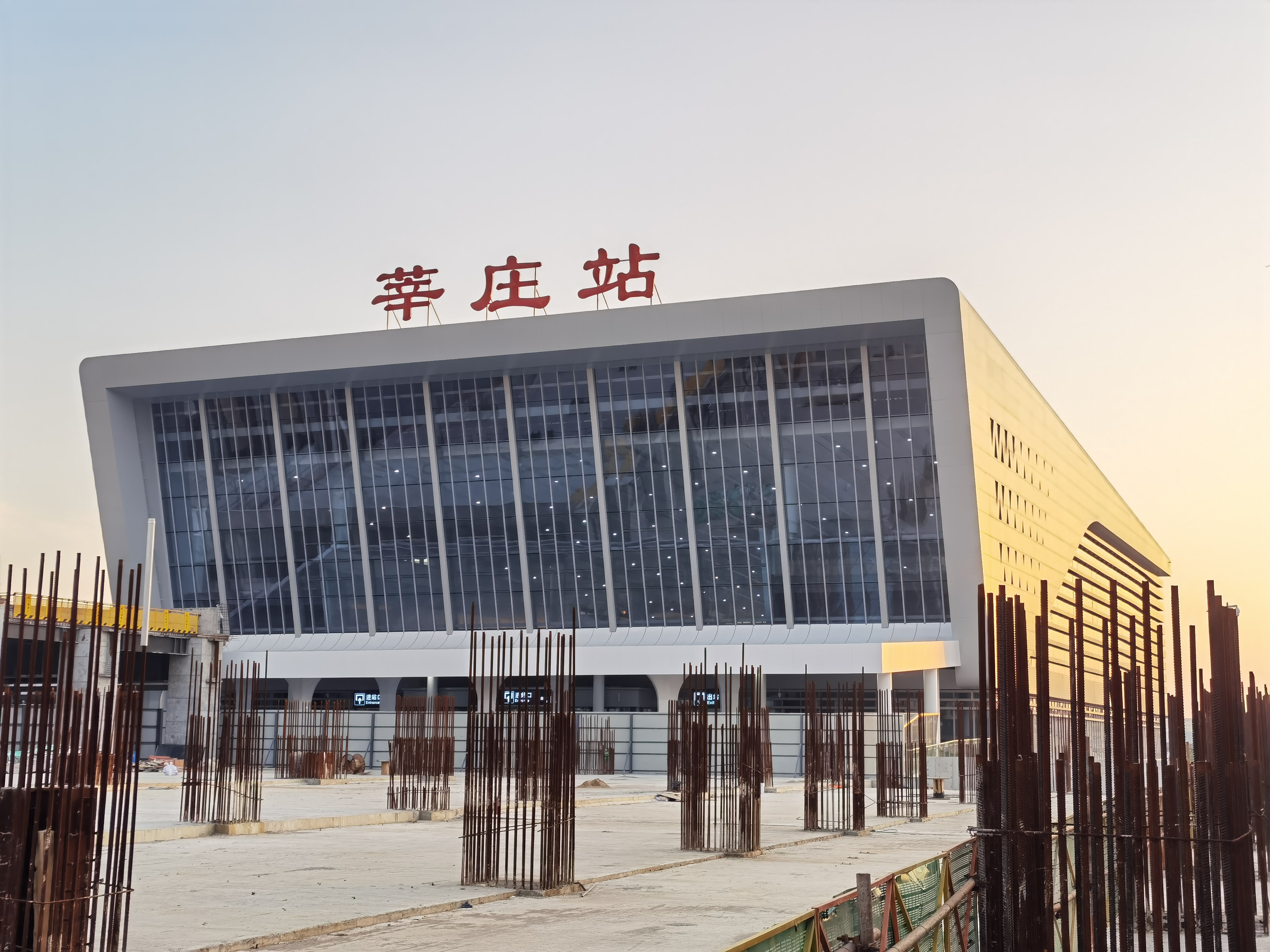

General information
- Location: Xinzhuang, Minhang District, Shanghai; China
- Coordinates: 31.1131°N 121.381°E
- Operator: China Railway Shanghai Railway Group
- Line: Shanghai–Kunming Railway ( Jinshan Railway)
- Connections: Xinzhuang 1 5

History
- Opened: 5 January 2025 (new station)

Services
Preceding station	Shanghai Suburban Railway	Following station
Terminus	Jinshan Railway Local	Chunshen towards Jinshanwei
Location
- Location within Shanghai

Xinzhuang railway station (simplified Chinese: 莘庄站; traditional Chinese: 莘莊站; pinyin: Xīnzhuāng zhàn) is a commuter rail station on the Jinshan railway, adjacent to the Xinzhuang station on the Shanghai Metro.

== History ==
It was built in the first year of Emperor Xuantong of the Qing Dynasty (1909).

The new railway station opened on 5 January 2025.

== Adjacent stations ==
Preceding station	China Railway	Following station
Shanghai South Terminus	Shanghai–Kunming railway	Chunshen towards Kunming
Preceding station	China Railway High-speed	Following station
Shanghai South Terminus	Shanghai–Kunming high-speed railway	Shanghai Songjiang towards Kunming South
Shanghai South Terminus	Shanghai–Suzhou–Huzhou high-speed railway Huchun Railway	Shanghai Songjiang towards Huzhou
