= Chunshen railway station =

Railway station in Shanghai, China

Coordinates: 31°04′45″N 121°21′16″E

Chunshen 春申
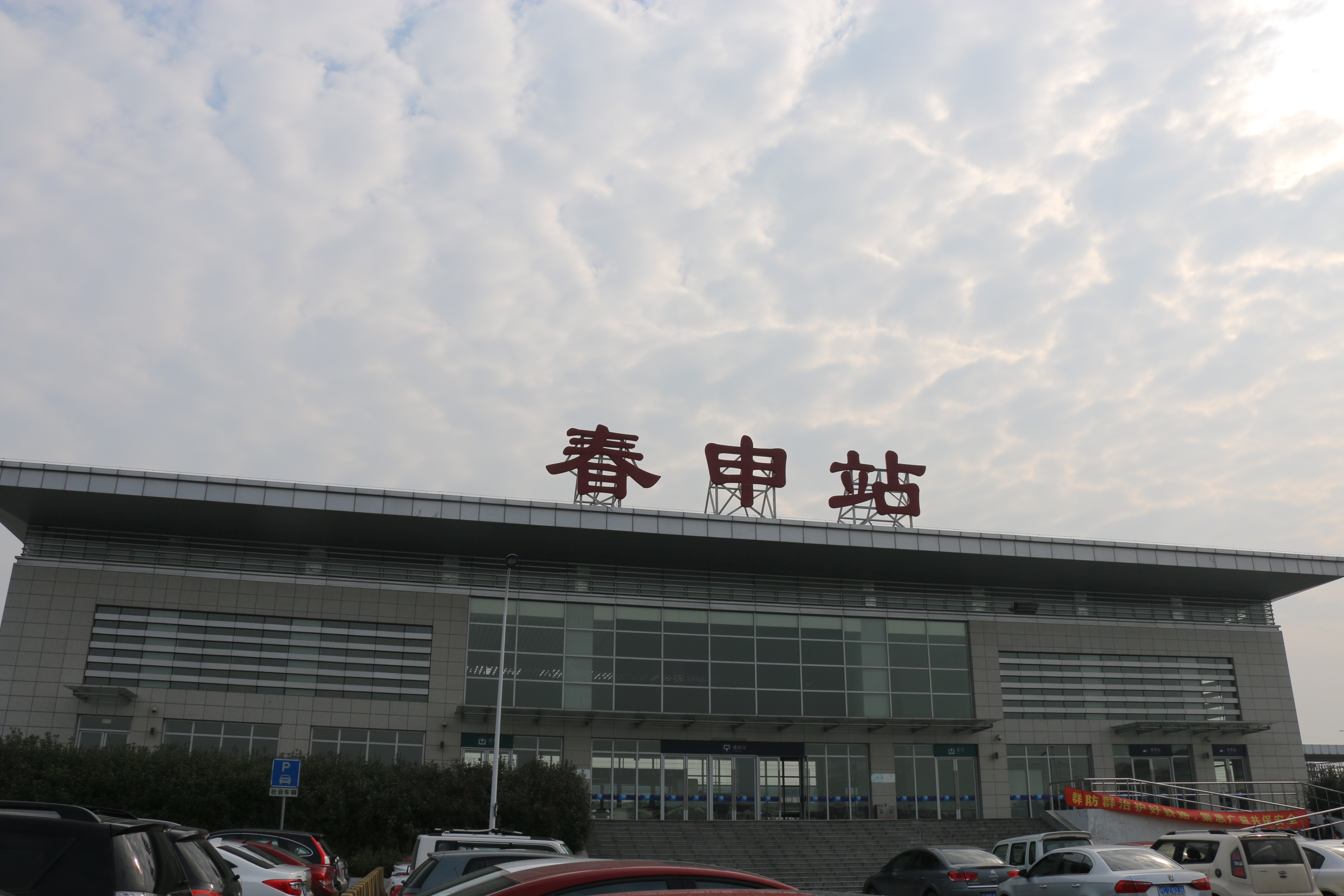
- Station exterior

General information
- Location: Songjiang District, Shanghai; China
- Lines: Shanghai–Kunming railway; Jinshan Railway

History
- Opened: September 28, 2012

Services
Preceding station	China Railway	Following station
Xinzhuang towards Shanghai South	Shanghai–Kunming railway	Xinqiao towards Kunming
Lijatang towards Shanghai	Shanghai–Kunming railway	Xinqiao towards Kunming
Xinzhuang towards Shanghai South	Jinshan railway	Xinqiao towards Jinshanwei
Location
- Location within Shanghai

Chunshen (Chinese: 春申; pinyin: Chūnshēn) is a railway station on the Jinshan railway in Songjiang District, Shanghai. It opened for intercity passenger service on September 28, 2012.
