= Shanghai South railway station =

Railway station Shanghai, China

Shanghainan
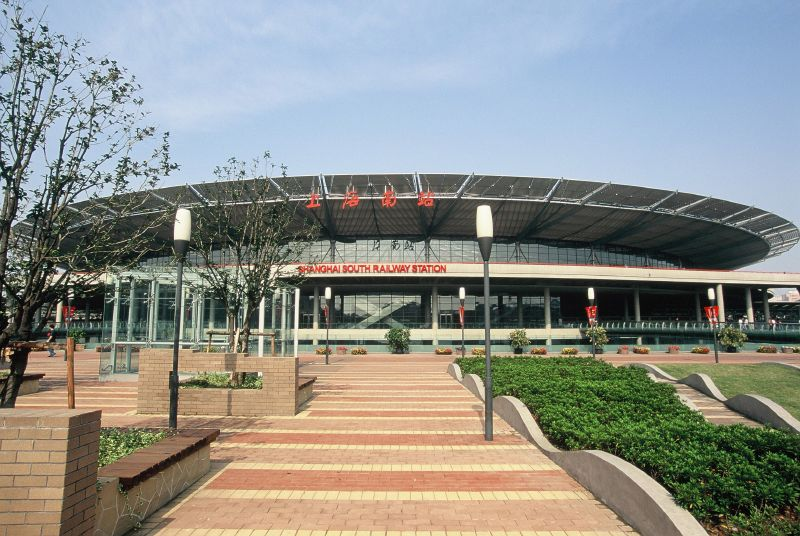
- Shanghai South (Shanghainan) railway station

Chinese name
- Simplified Chinese: 上海南站
- Traditional Chinese: 上海南站
Transcriptions
Standard Mandarin
- Hanyu Pinyin: Shànghǎi Nánzhàn

General information
- Other names: Shanghai South
- Location: Laohumin Lu, Xuhui District, Shanghai; China
- Coordinates: 31°09′16″N 121°25′27″E
- Operator: CR Shanghai
- Lines: Shanghai–Kunming railway; Shanghai–Kunming high-speed railway; Shanghai–Suzhou–Huzhou high-speed railway; Jinshan Railway
- Platforms: 11 (5 island platforms, 1 side platform)
- Connections: Metro station 1 3 15; Bus terminal

Construction
- Structure type: At-grade

History
- Opened: 1908; 118 years ago (former address); 2006; 20 years ago (current address)
- Closed: 1937; 89 years ago (bombed by the Japanese)

Services
| Preceding station | China Railway | Following station |
|---|---|---|
| Terminus | Shanghai–Kunming railway | Xinzhuang towards Kunming |
| Terminus | Jinshan railway | Xinzhuang towards Jinshanwei |
| Preceding station | China Railway High-speed | Following station |
| Terminus | Shanghai–Hangzhou high-speed railway | Xinzhuang towards Hangzhou |
| Terminus | Shanghai–Suzhou–Huzhou high-speed railway | Xinzhuang towards Huzhou |
Location
- Location within Shanghai

Shanghainan (Shanghai South) railway station (Chinese: 上海南站; pinyin: Shànghǎi Nánzhàn; Shanghainese: Zånhae Nuezae) is a railway station in the city of Shanghai, China. In the Xuhui District, its importance is second only to the Shanghai railway station. After extensive renovation that was finished in 2006, the station features a modern circular design, the first of its kind in the world. The station was expected to handle 15 million passengers annually.

Most trains to cities of Zhejiang, including Hangzhou, Shaoxing, Ningbo, Jinhua and Wenzhou and other southern provinces of China terminate at Shanghai South Station. It is also possible to catch high-speed services to West Kowloon station in Hong Kong via Shanghai Hongqiao railway station: - customs and immigration clearance is done in Hong Kong.

Shanghai South railway station also serves as the starting point for the Jinshan railway, running via Xinzhuang in Minhang District to Jinshanwei in Jinshan District, crossing the Huangpu River on a dedicated railway bridge.

Shanghai Metro lines 1, 3, and 15 also serve this station with entrances inside the main train station.

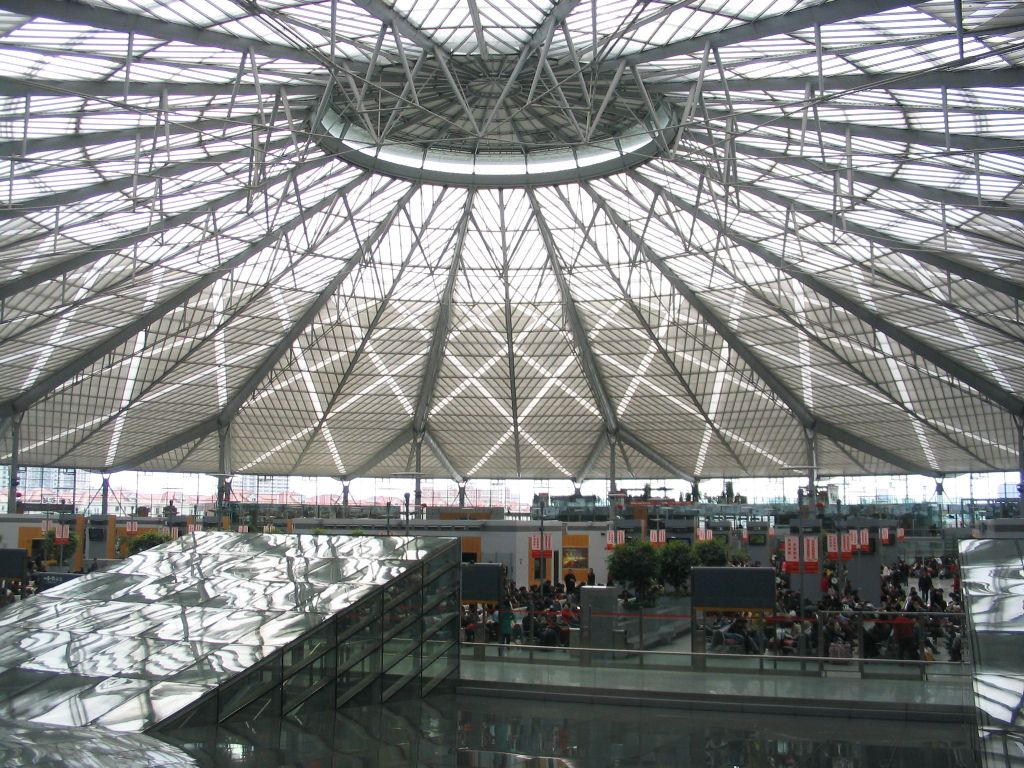
Lobby of the Shanghai South station

== History ==
Shanghai South station was originally constructed in 1908 as the terminus of the Shanghai-Hangzhou railway line. In 1937, during the Battle of Shanghai, part of the Second Sino-Japanese War, the Japanese advanced towards the station in an action known as Bloody Saturday. The fighting destroyed the building and killed many civilians; a photograph depicting a crying Chinese baby among the ruins became Time's image of the year.

An extensive redesign has been carried out until 2006 by AREP (Paris), ECADI (Shanghai) and MaP3 (structural engineer - Paris), making the new station the world's first circular railway station. With the reopening, two minor Shanghai railway stations have been closed: Shanghai West in Putuo District and Meilong station near Jinjiang Park. All railway connections of these stations have been moved to Shanghai South station, and according to estimates, up to 40% of passengers of Shanghai station will be diverted to the new station.

A station fire occurred on April 24, 2010, at 4 pm that was extinguished in 30 minutes.

In 2024, it was announced that Shanghai South Railway Station will be converted into a high-speed rail station and the Shanghai–Hangzhou high-speed railway will be moved to South station and the conventional railways will be moved to Shanghai Songjiang station by 2025. This will relieve congestion at Hongqiao station when the Shanghai–Suzhou–Huzhou high-speed railway opens.

== Station ==
The Station is located in the southwestern part of Xuhui District, occupying sixty hectares of land. The new look of South Station has a very clean, airport-like look and feel. The station itself is elevated 47 meters above ground and has a diameter of some 270 metres (885 ft 10 in). It is made out of polycarbonate and aluminium sunblades, and supported by 18 branch-shaped beams resting on 3 columns each. The steel structure weight is 6000 T, for 56,000 square metres (600,000 sq ft), and a 150 m (490 ft) maximum span. The steel structure was built by Shanghai Jiangnan shipyard and erected by SMCC.

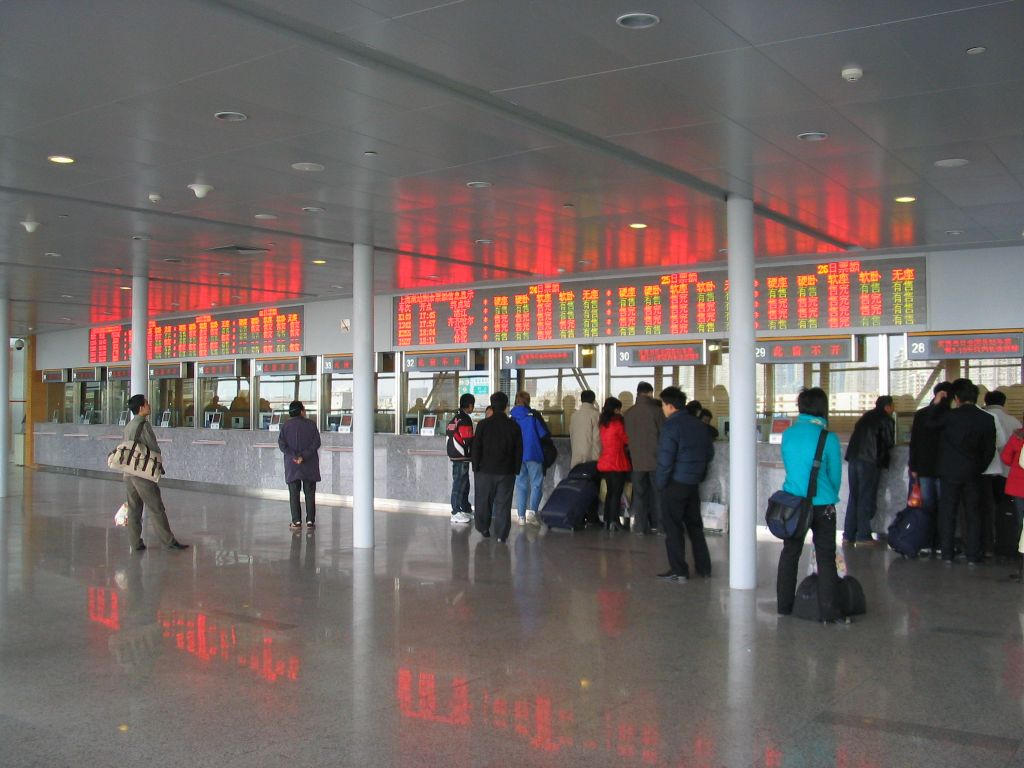
Ticket office at Shanghai South

The trains arrive below the waiting areas, which are not interrupted by the structure itself, which is roughly divided into three levels. The mid-level contains the station platforms, at the same rough height as ground level, and contains thirteen tracks and six passenger platforms. The VIP waiting section and the Public Security Office is also on this level. In addition the mid-level has direct access to the northern and southern squares. The upper level is the departure level. With a circumference of over 800 metres (2,624 ft 8 in), the waiting area can fit over 10,000 passengers at any given time. Passenger tickets are also validated in this area. The lower level is the arrivals level, which contains various tunnels to exit the station and the waiting area of the Line 1 and Line 3 in the Shanghai Metro system. In the future it will also contain a transfer tunnel to the newly opened L1 Line as well as access to long-distance and tourist buses. The underground level of the North and South Squares has various commercial establishments and a parking lot.

The soft-seat waiting area requires a soft-class train ticket to access. The seating in the area is generally more comfortable, and it is an enclosed area, with security personnel on shift at the entrances. The regular waiting area is in the middle of the station, and can house thousands of passengers. The VIP waiting area is only accessible with special identification, such as diplomatic documents.

Shanghai South is serviced by Shanghai Metro Line 1, Line 3, and Line 15 via the interchange station named after the train station, which is within walking distance of the train station. Transfer corridors in the station building allow indoor transfer between the train station and the metro station.

== See also ==
- Urban rail transit in China
- Shanghai North railway station
