= Jinjiang Park station =

Shanghai Metro station

Jinjiang Park 锦江乐园
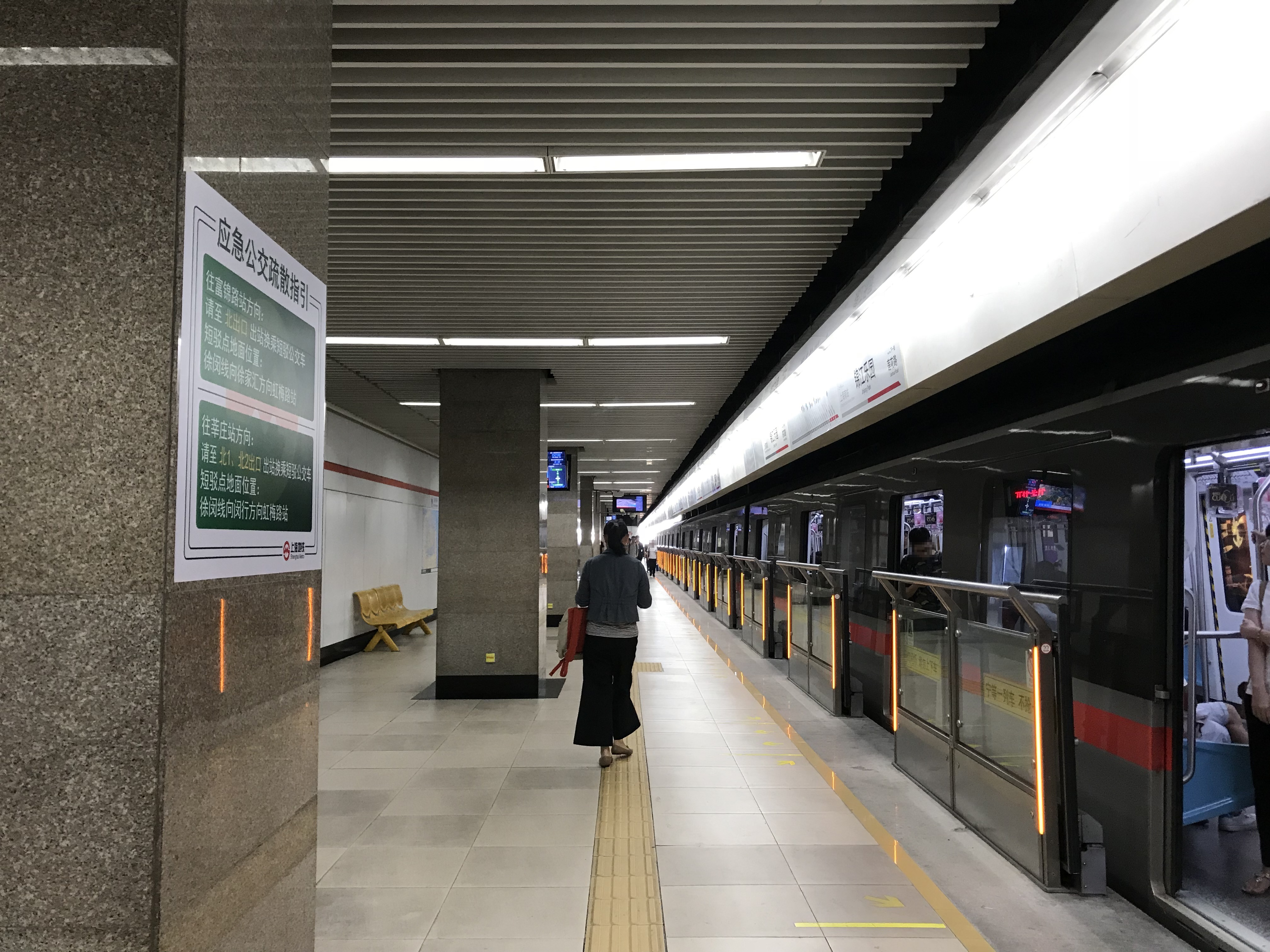
- Station platform

General information
- Location: Humin Road and Hongmei Road; Xuhui District, Shanghai; China
- Coordinates: 31°08′32″N 121°24′51″E
- Operator: Shanghai No. 1 Metro Operation Co. Ltd.
- Line: Line 1
- Platforms: 2 (2 side platforms)
- Tracks: 2

Construction
- Structure type: At-grade
- Accessible: Yes

Other information
- Station code: L01/04

History
- Opened: 28 May 1993
- Former names: Hongmei Road (between 28 December 1996 and 1 May 2001)

Services
Preceding station	Shanghai Metro	Following station
Shanghai South Railway Station towards Fujin Road	Line 1	Lianhua Road towards Xinzhuang
Location
- Location within Shanghai

Jinjiang Park (Chinese: 锦江乐园; pinyin: Jǐnjiāng Lèyuán) is a station on Shanghai Metro Line 1. Before 19 April 2001 it was known as Hongmei Road station which is now the name of a different station on Line 12.

The station is part of the first southern extension of the line which opened on 10 April 1995. During the time the metro line was open for public testing this station was the southern terminus. Later three more stations were added to the south of this station: Lianhua Road, Waihuanlu and Xinzhuang.

== Places nearby ==
- Jinjiang Action Park, an amusement park
- Meilong railway station (now closed)

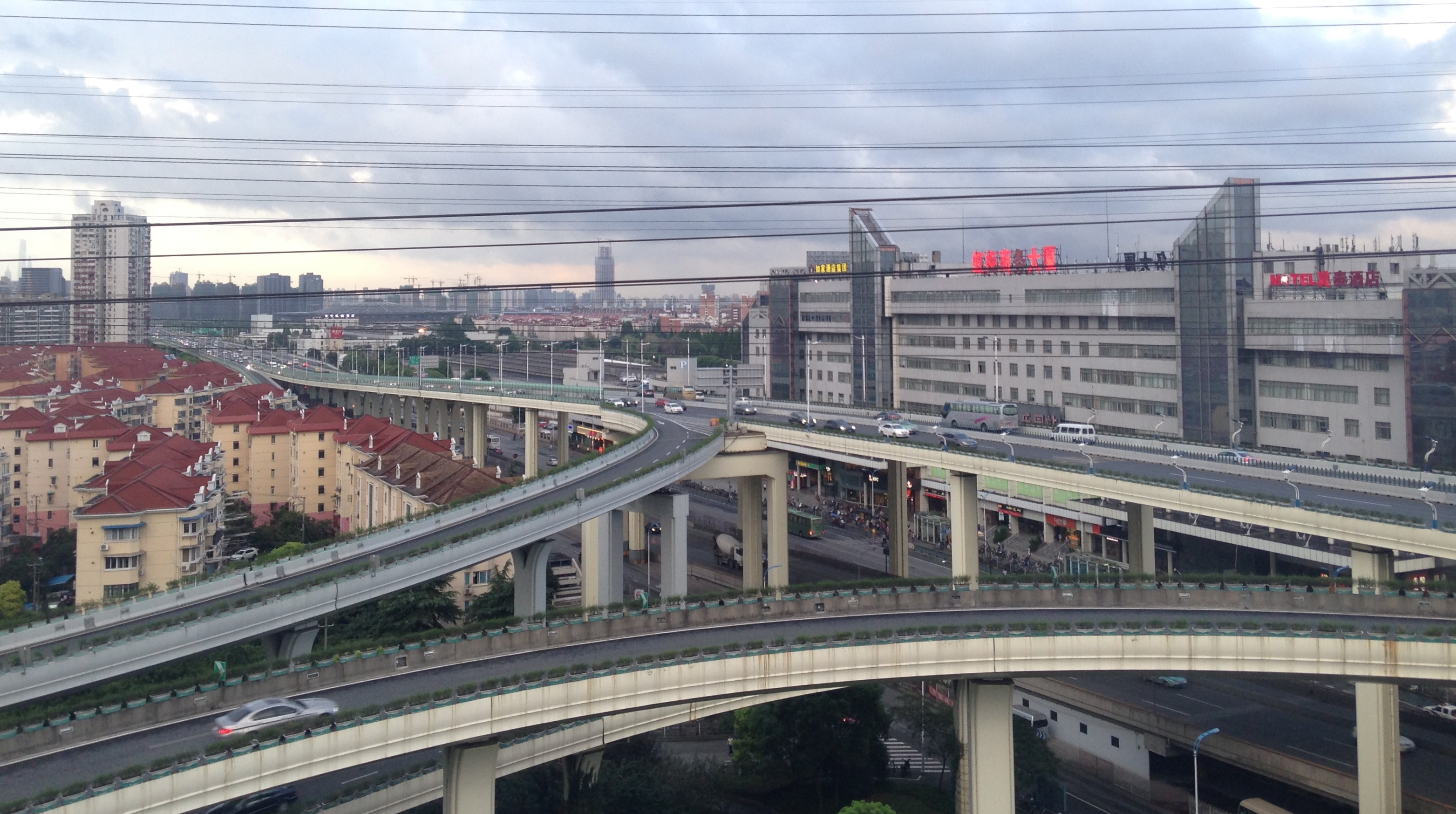
Large building on Humin Road. All the exits of Jinjiang Park metro station are visible at the ground floor.
