= Suzhou South railway station =

Railway station in Suzhou, Jiangsu, China

Suzhounan 苏州南
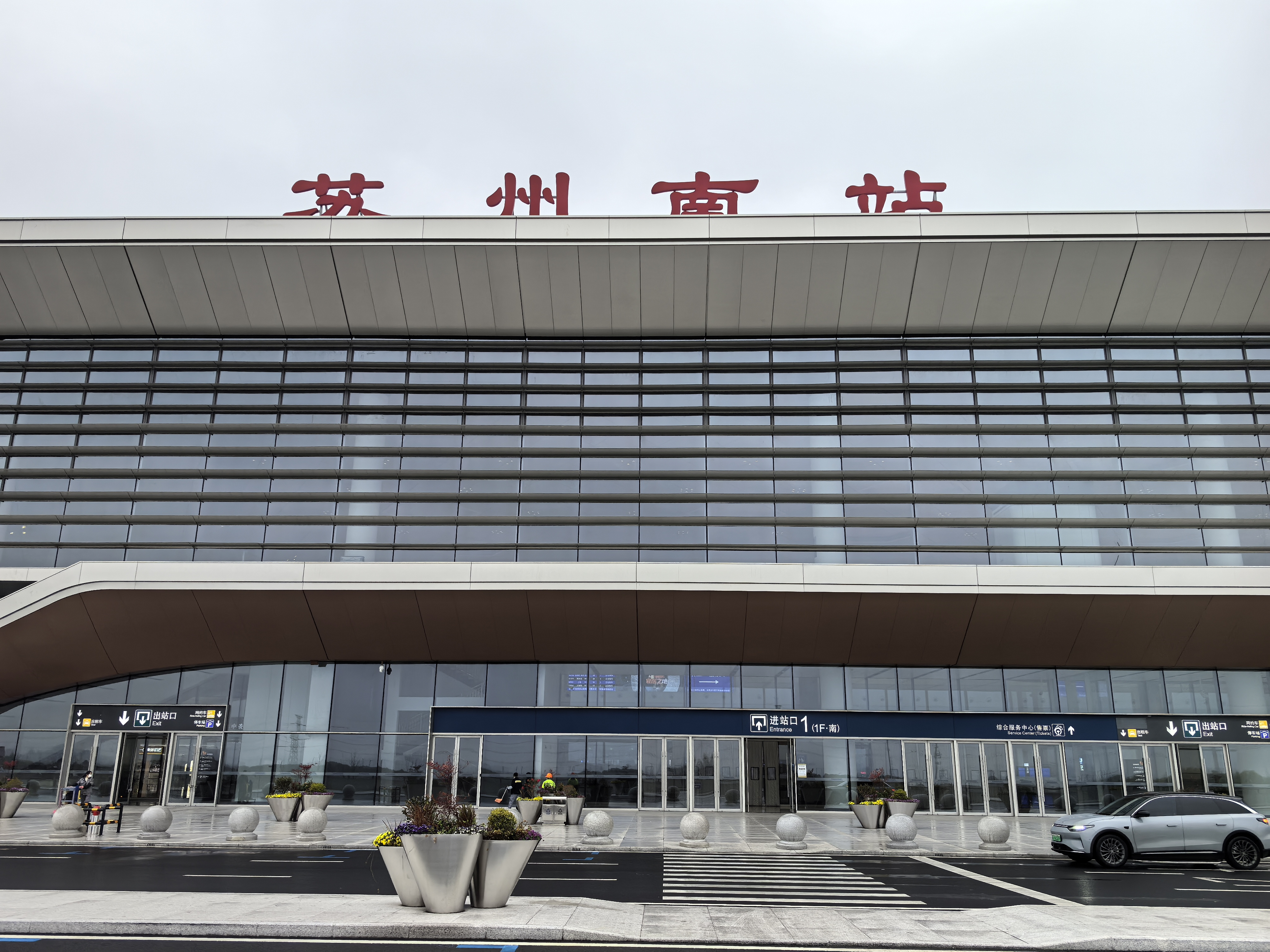
- Southern exterior of the station in 2025

General information
- Other names: Suzhou South
- Location: Lili, Wujiang, Suzhou, Jiangsu; China
- Coordinates: 31.065553°N 120.794959°E
- Operator: CR Shanghai
- Lines: Shanghai–Suzhou–Huzhou high-speed railway; Nantong–Suzhou–Jiaxing–Ningbo high-speed railway (under construction)
- Platforms: 2
- Tracks: 6
- Connections: 10 (under construction)

Other information
- Status: Operational
- Station code: 32026

History
- Opened: December 26, 2024
- Former names: Fenhu
Location

Suzhounan (Suzhou South) railway station (Chinese: 苏州南站; pinyin: Sūzhōunán Zhàn) is a railway station in Lili, Wujiang, Suzhou, Jiangsu, China. It was known as Fenhu station during the planning stage. It opened on December 26, 2024, with the rest of Shanghai–Suzhou–Huzhou high-speed railway.

== Design ==
=== Station building ===
The station is a 40,000 square metres (430,000 sq ft) hexagonal design, with a capacity of 3,000 passengers.

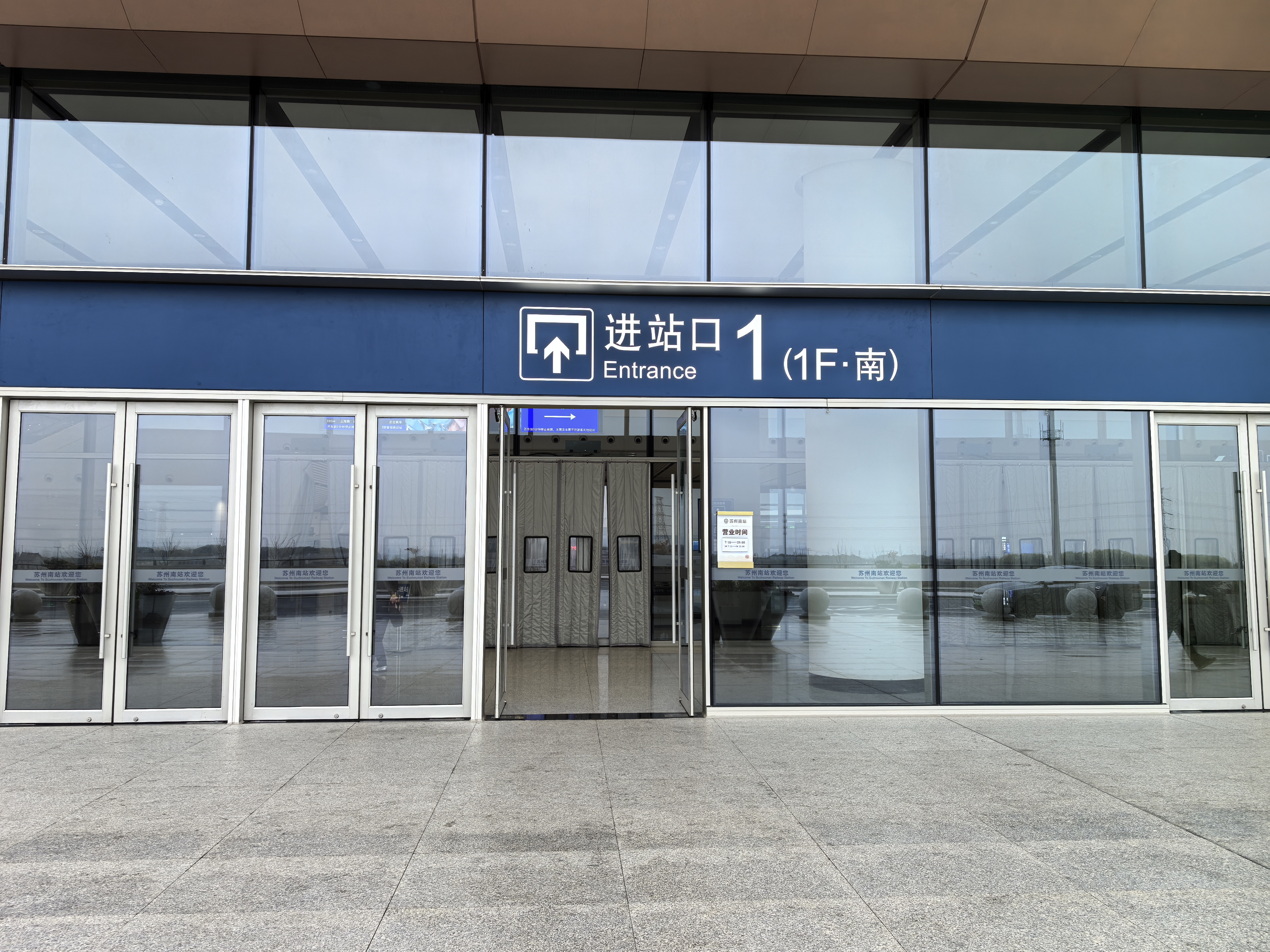
South entrance

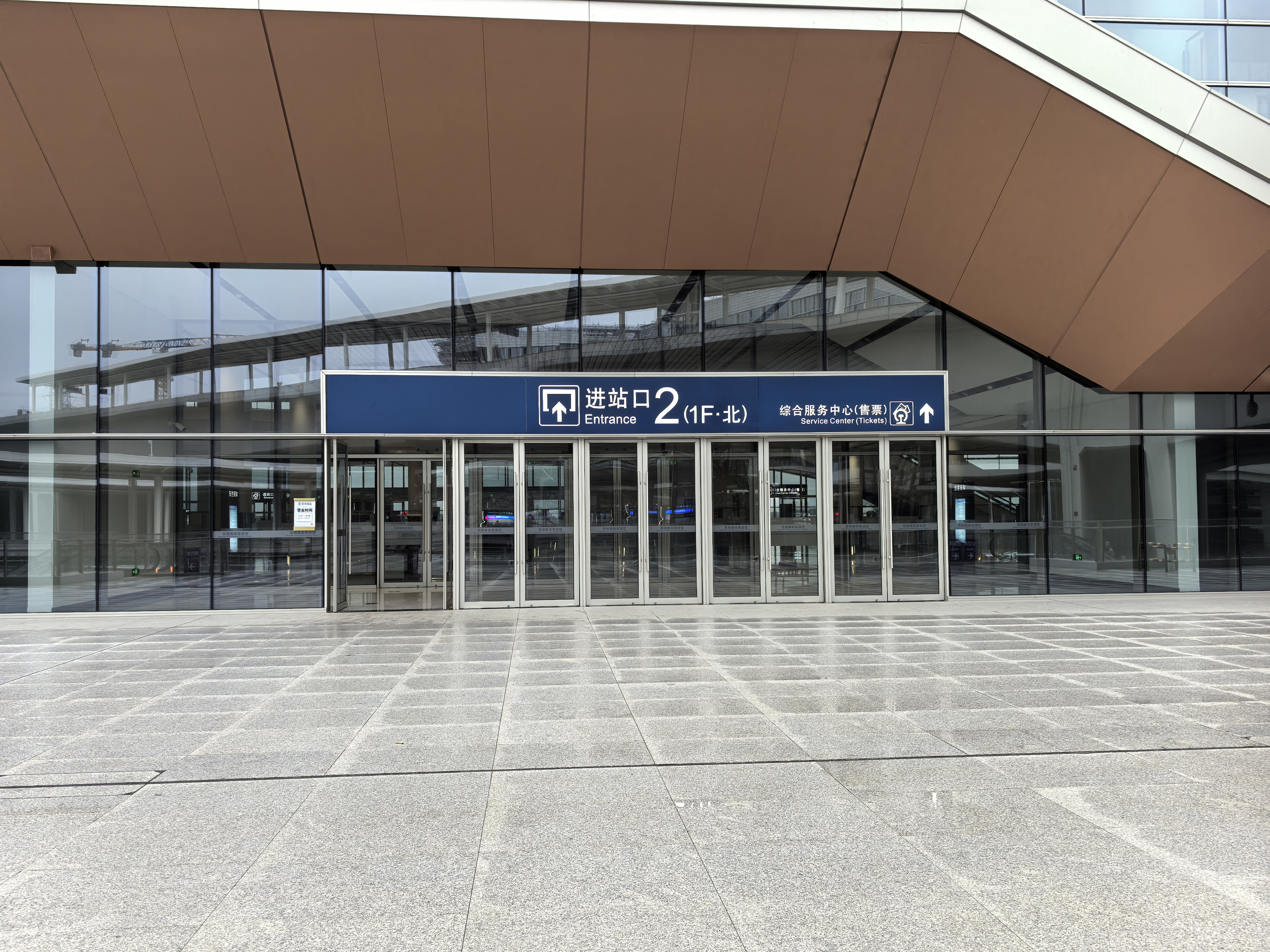
North entrance

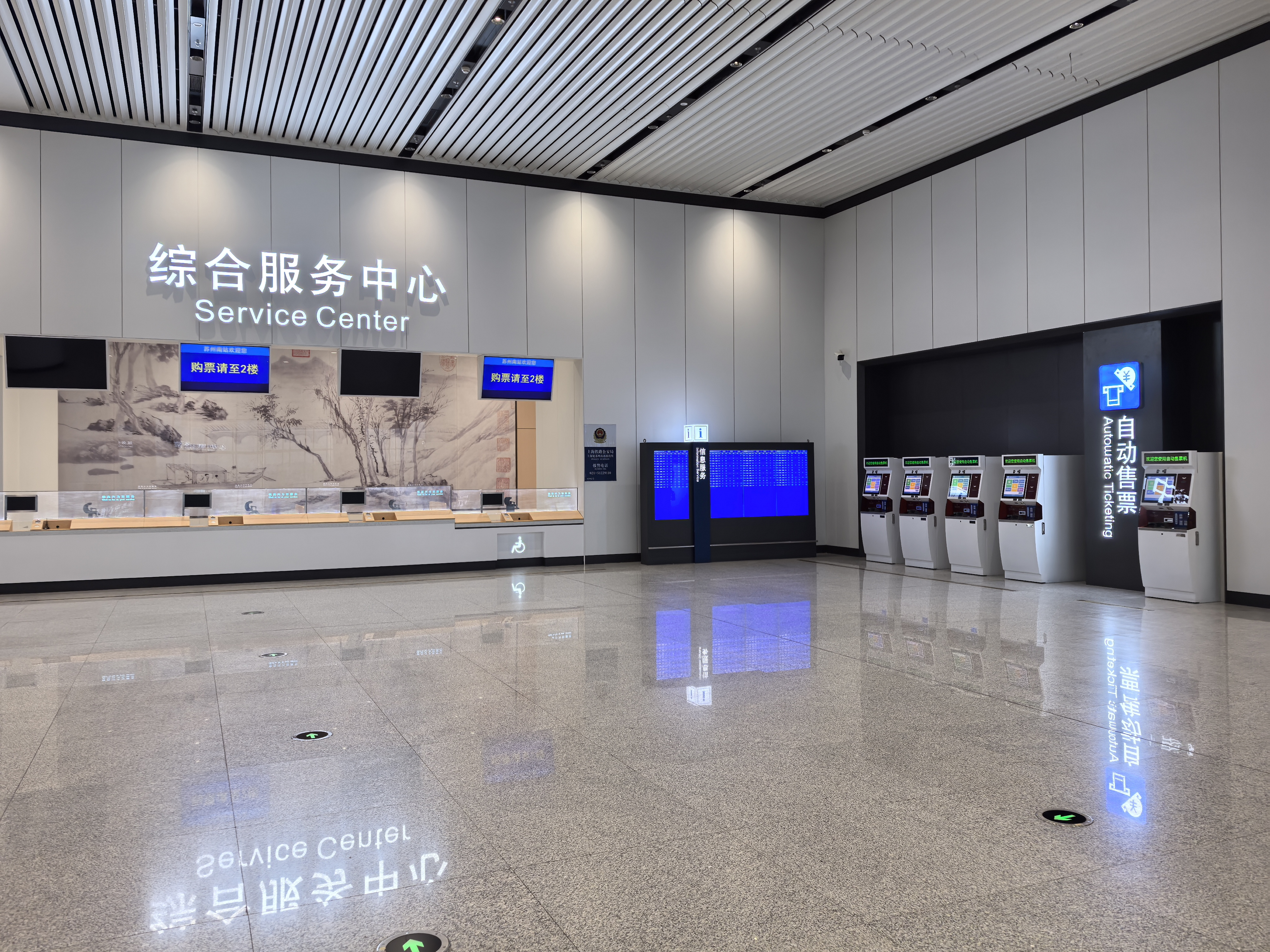
First floor passenger services

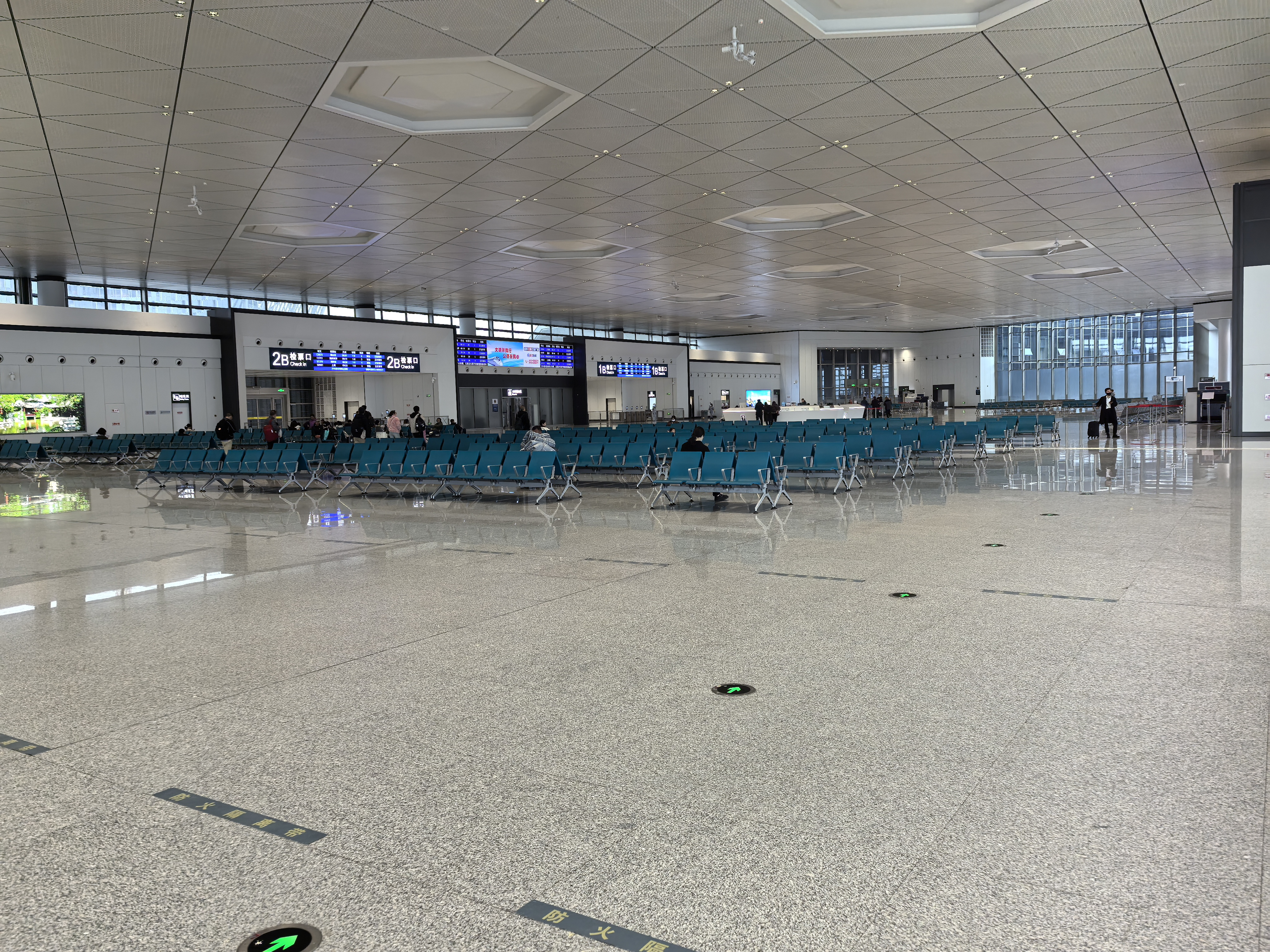
Second floor waiting area

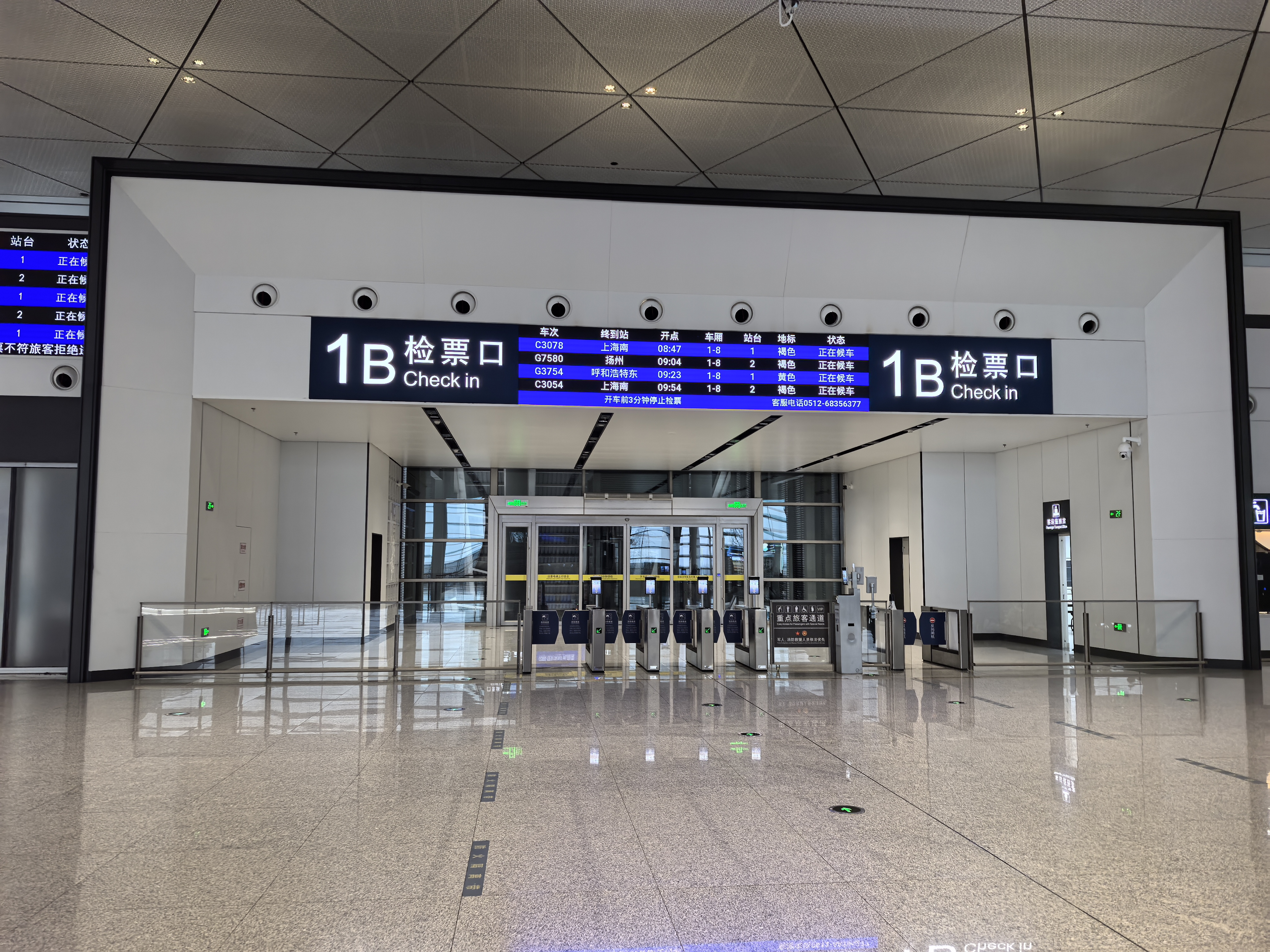
Gate 1B (towards Shanghai Hongqiao)

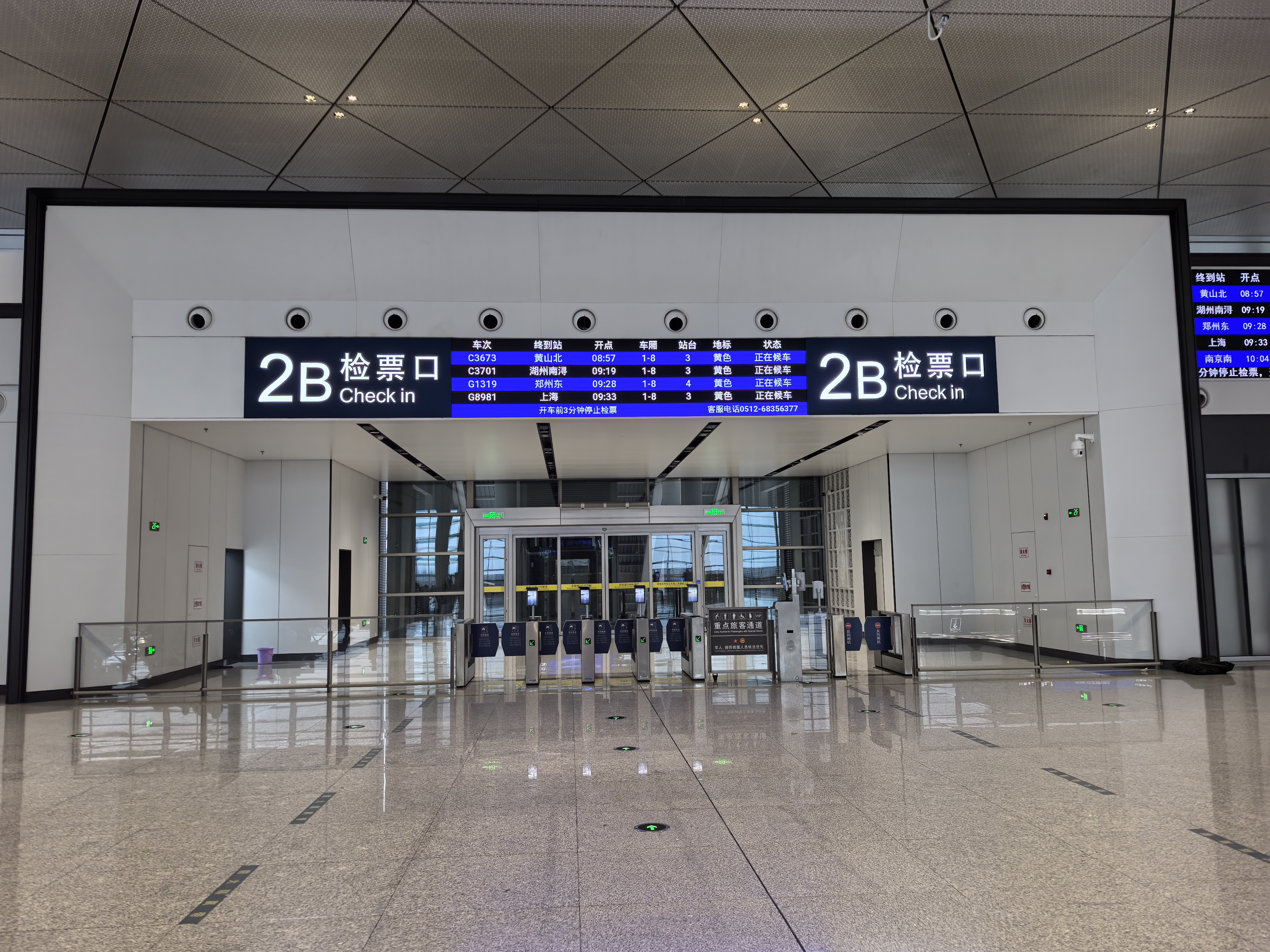
Gate 2B (towards Huzhou)

=== Track layout ===
The station has a total of 12 tracks and 4 platforms (8 platform sides), with Shanghai–Suzhou–Huzhou high-speed railway and the under construction Nantong–Suzhou–Jiaxing–Ningbo high-speed railway each having 6 tracks and 2 platforms on elevated structures.

A future Suzhou Metro Line 10 station is partially constructed and located in the B2 basement level of the station.

Preceding station	China Railway High-speed	Following station
Liantang towards Shanghai Hongqiao	Shanghai–Suzhou–Huzhou high-speed railway	Shengze towards Huzhou
