= Lianhua Road station =

Shanghai Metro station

Lianhua Road 莲花路
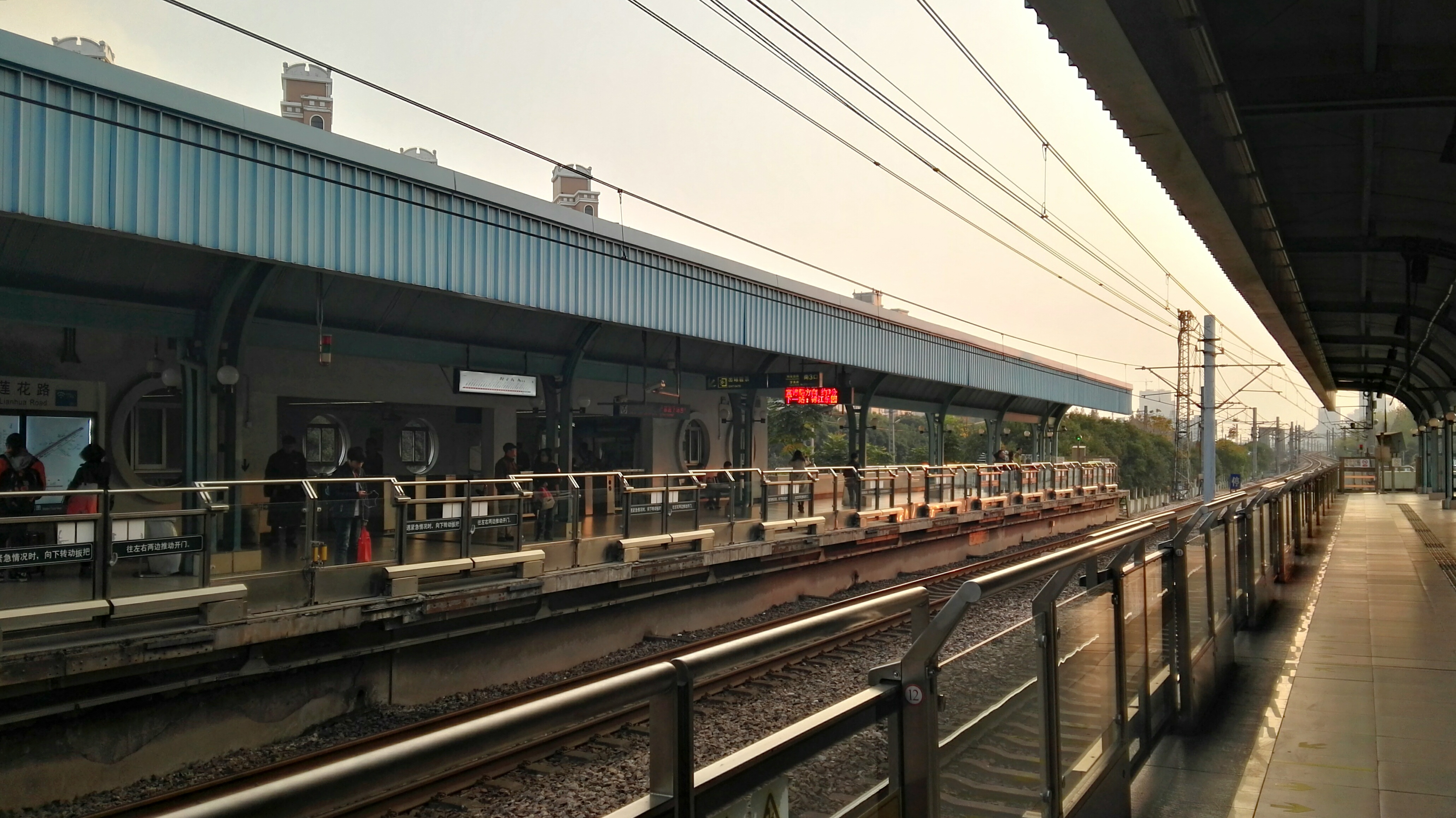
- Platform

General information
- Location: Humin Road and Lianhua Road; Minhang District, Shanghai; China
- Coordinates: 31°07′51″N 121°24′13″E
- Operator: Shanghai No. 1 Metro Operation Co. Ltd.
- Line: Line 1
- Platforms: 2 (2 side platforms)
- Tracks: 2

Construction
- Structure type: At-grade
- Accessible: Yes

Other information
- Station code: L01/03

History
- Opened: 28 December 1996

Services
Preceding station	Shanghai Metro	Following station
Jinjiang Park towards Fujin Road	Line 1	Waihuanlu towards Xinzhuang
Location
- Location within Shanghai

Lianhua Road (Chinese: 莲花路; pinyin: Liánhuā Lù) is a metro station on Shanghai Metro Line 1. It is located on the southeast side of Humin Road, between Wanyuan Road and Lianhua Road.

== Exit list ==
On June 25, 2021, the construction for the North Plaza mall and the station transformation finished. The station went from four to seven exits. Some even connect with the existing pedestrian overpass of the Nanfang commercial area the station is serving.

Lianhua Road station Exit List in 2021
Exit No.	Side of Station	Location	Other Information
Exit 1	To Xinzhuang (bound) Platform	At the east of the 3F station hall with a connection with the overpass corridor	Built in 2021 during the station transformation (see Station transformation section)
Exit 2	To Xinzhuang (bound) Platform	To the Ground floor of the new North Square (paid area entrance is at the 3F of station hall; access via escalator from north square)	Built in 2021 during the station transformation (see Station transformation section)
Exit 3	To Xinzhuang (bound) Platform	At the west of the 3F station hall with a connection with the overpass corridor	Built in 2021 during the station transformation (see Station transformation section)
Exit 4	To Fujin Road (bound) Platform	To the Ground floor of the new North Square through the northside of old (west) underground passageway. The passageway is shared with Exit 5.	Replaced in 2021
Exit 5	To Fujin Road (bound) Platform	To Meilong Road (South Plaza) through the south side of the same passageway for Exit 4	Existing South Entrances (before 2021)
Exit 6	To Fujin Road (bound) Platform	To Meilong Road (South Plaza) through the south side of the old (east) underground passageway. The passageway is shared with Exit 7.	Existing South Entrances (before 2021)
Exit 7	To Fujin Road (bound) Platform	To the Ground floor of the new North Square through the northside of the old (east) underground passageway. The passageway is shared with Exit 6.	Replaced in 2021

== Layout ==
- B1F: Underpass connecting North Square (Humin Road) and South Square (West Meilong Road); Exits of the platform for trains bounding for Fujin Road
- 1F: Shops; Exits of the platform for trains bounding for Xinzhuang Station
- 2F: Platforms

== Station transformation ==
It has been announced that the station will undergo an expansion, with newly-added passage between platforms in the payment area. Currently, passengers going between two platforms must exit the station first. Besides, the north square of the station will go over a new construction, with a newly-designed shopping center and connection with the existing pedestrian overpass of Nanfang commercial area the station is serving.

The demolition of north square building started from June 23, 2018, marking the start of the reconstruction. The whole project is planned to be completed before the end of 2019. Japanese real estate developer Mitsui Fudosan will participate in the redevelopment and will operate the context from the scheduled date in 2020.

On June 25, 2021, the construction was transformation was completed after three years of work. The capacity of the station has been significantly increased, and with the completion of a shopping mall attached to the station, people will be able to interchange between the Metro line and buses without leaving the building. The current peak number of passengers going through the station on weekdays is 90,000, placing a big burden on the station which was built on the ground level with no entrance hall. The project increased the width of the platforms from 5.5 meters to 8.5 meters, and built an entrance hall on the second floor of the building attached to the station. The shopping mall, which is still under construction, has escalators that connect passengers of Line 1 and buses. This station is in a transport hub with dozens of bus lines, among which 14 were distributed on two sides of the station. Now the terminal station of the 14 bus lines is on one side and connected to the Metro station via the mall.
