= Shanghai Songjiang railway station =

Railway station in Shanghai, China

Shanghai Songjiang
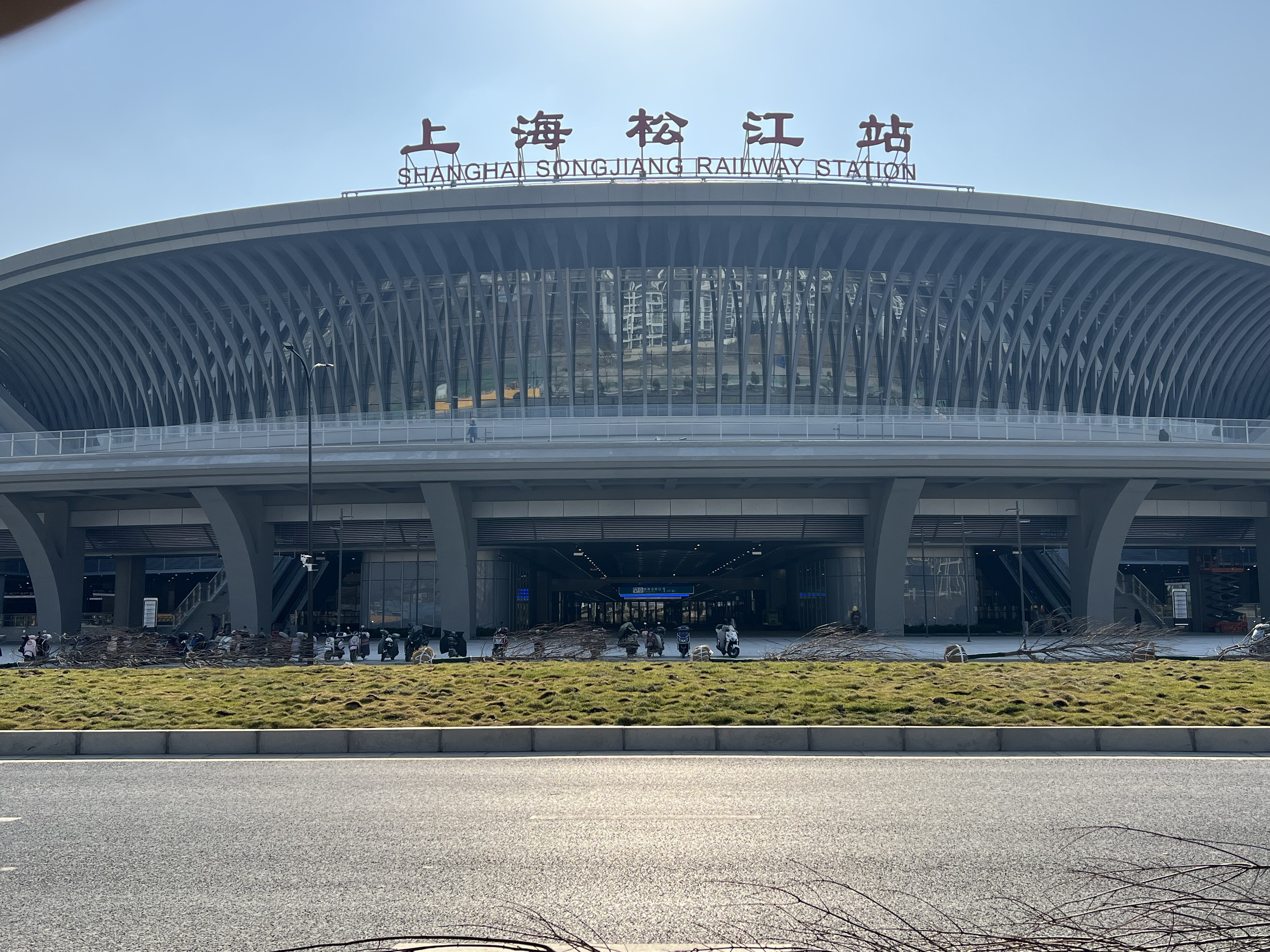
- North Area Waiting Room of the Station

Chinese name
- Simplified Chinese: 上海松江站
- Traditional Chinese: 上海松江站
Transcriptions
Standard Mandarin
- Hanyu Pinyin: Shànghǎi Sōngjiāng Zhàn

General information
- Location: Yancang Road No.1; Songjiang District, Shanghai; China
- Coordinates: 30°58′58″N 121°13′48″E
- Operator: China Railway Corporation
- Lines: Shanghai–Hangzhou high-speed railway; Shanghai–Suzhou–Huzhou high-speed railway; Shanghai–Kunming railway
- Connections: Shanghai Songjiang Railway Station 9

Other information
- Station code: TMIS code: 32022; Telegraph code: IMH; Pinyin code: SJN
- Classification: 3rd class station

History
- Former names: Songjiang South railway station
Location
- Location within Shanghai

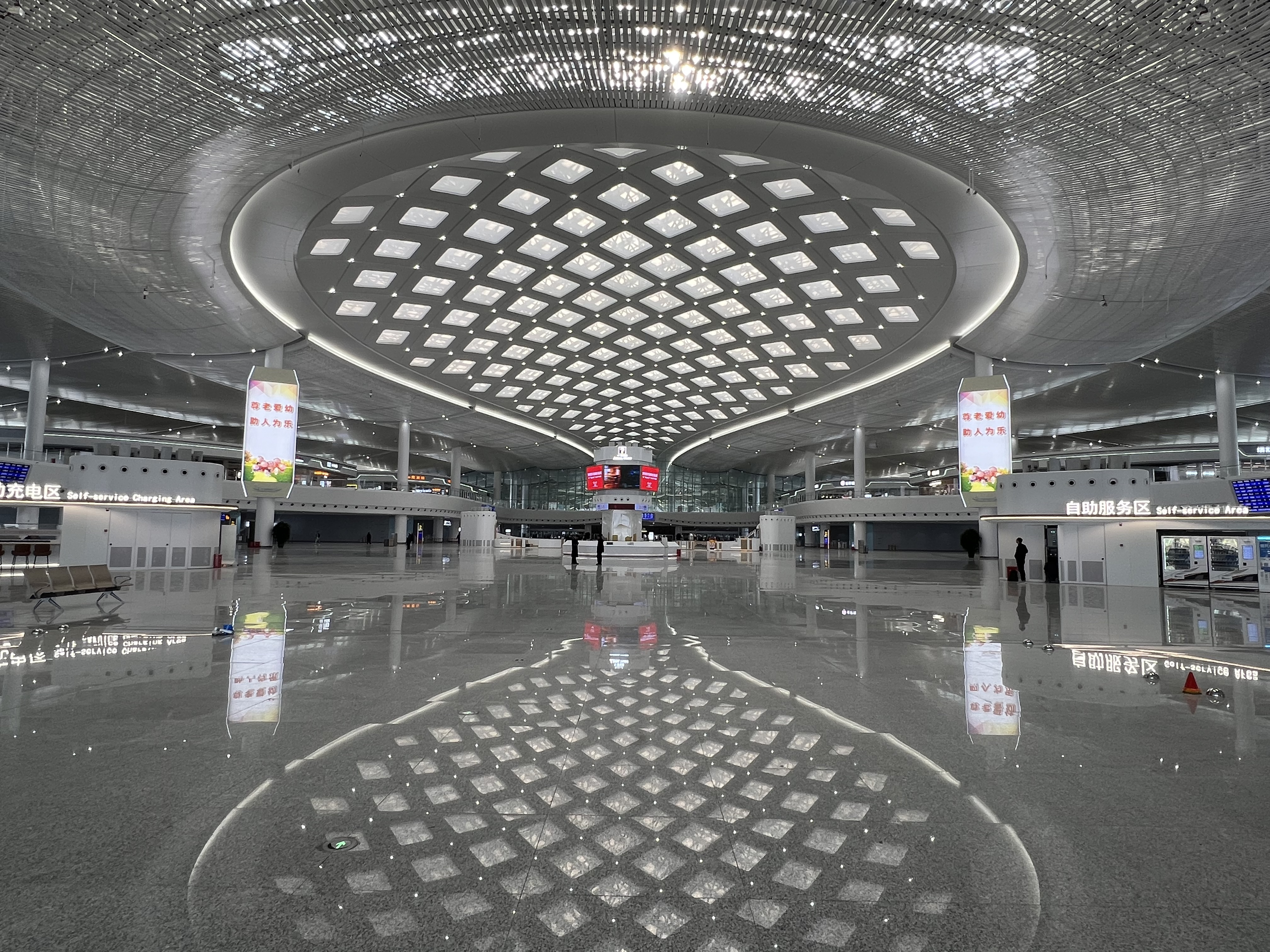
North hall of Shanghai Songjiang station

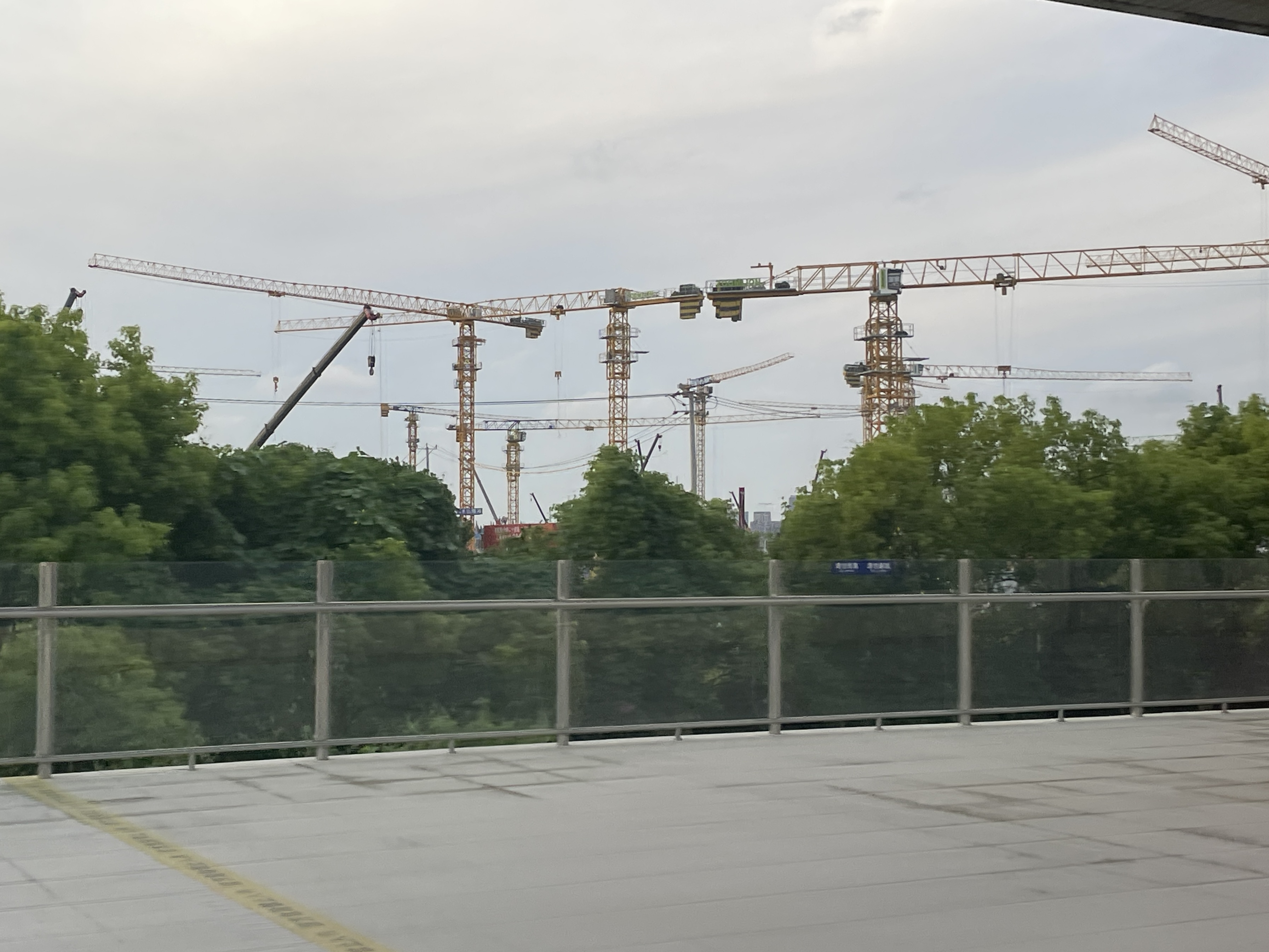
Shanghai Songjiang Station under Construction in August 2023

Shanghai Songjiang railway station (Chinese: 上海松江站; pinyin: Shànghǎi Sōngjiāng Zhàn, formerly Songjiang South railway station) is a railway station on the Shanghai–Hangzhou high-speed railway and Shanghai–Suzhou–Huzhou high-speed railway located in Songjiang District, Shanghai, China. It is the terminus of many conventional-speed trains on the Shanghai–Hangzhou portion of the Shanghai–Kunming railway.

With the construction of the Shanghai-Suzhou-Huzhou High-speed Railway in Songjiang District, Shanghai, the scale of the high-speed rail is expanded from 2 platforms and 4 tracks to 9 platforms and 23 tracks, second only to Shanghai Hongqiao railway station (30 platforms and 16 tracks) and the under construction Shanghai East railway station (14 platforms and 30 tracks), the third largest high-speed railway station in Shanghai. The scale of the Shanghai Songjiang railway station building will be approximately 60,000 square meters on the line, and it is predicted that the passenger flow in the future will be about 20 million or more per year.

The station will serve:

- China Railway
  - Shanghai–Suzhou–Huzhou high-speed railway
  - Shanghai-Kunming high-speed railway
  - Shanghai-Kunming railway
- Shanghai Metropolitan Area Intercity Railway
  - East-West connection line (planned)
  - Jiaqingsongjin line (planned)
- Shanghai metro:
  - Line 9
  - Line 23 extension (planned)

== History ==
The station opened on 26 October 2010.

The station renamed from Songjiang South railway station to Shanghai Songjiang railway station on 22 May 2024.

The Shanghai-Kunming railway Songjiang section was connected to the new line passing through this station on December 13, 2024, with the northern section of the station's ordinary railway yard becoming operational. On December 26, 2024, the northern part of the station was commence passenger services with the opening of the Shanghai-Suzhou-Huzhou High-Speed Railway, while the ordinary railway yard was temporarily not handle passenger services. After the train operation schedule adjustment in the first quarter of 2025, the station will handle 113 high-speed train services and 77 ordinary train services daily for passengers.

== See also ==
- Shanghai Songjiang Railway Station metro station, metro station on Line 9, Shanghai Metro
- Songjiang North railway station, another railway station in Songjiang District, Shanghai, formerly named Songjiang railway station, now closed

Preceding station	China Railway	Following station
Xinqiao towards Shanghai or Shanghai South	Shanghai–Kunming railway	Shihudang towards Kunming
Preceding station	China Railway High-speed	Following station
Shanghai Hongqiao Terminus	Shanghai–Hangzhou high-speed railway	Jinshan North towards Hangzhou
Xinzhuang towards Shanghai South	Shanghai–Hangzhou high-speed railway	Jinshan North towards Hangzhou
Shanghai Hongqiao Terminus	Shanghai–Suzhou–Huzhou high-speed railway	Liantang towards Huzhou
Xinzhuang towards Shanghai South	Shanghai–Suzhou–Huzhou high-speed railway	Liantang towards Huzhou
