= Xinzhuang station =

Xinzhuang station may refer to:

- Xinzhuang railway station (Shanghai), a railway station in Shanghai, China
- Xinzhuang station (Shanghai Metro), a metro station in Shanghai, China
- Xinzhuang MRT station, a metro station in New Taipei, Taiwan
- Xinzhuang railway station (Taiwan), a railway station in Hsinchu, Taiwan

== See also ==
- Xinzhuang (disambiguation)
