= Liantang station =

Liantang station or Liantang railway station may refer to:

- Liantang station (Guangzhou Metro) (莲塘站)
- Liantang station (Shenzhen Metro) (莲塘站)
- Liantang railway station (Jiangxi) (莲塘站), station on Beijing–Kowloon railway
- Liantang railway station (Shanghai) (练塘站), station on Shanghai–Suzhou–Huzhou high-speed railway
