= Meilong railway station =

Railway station in Shanghai, China

Meilong 梅陇站
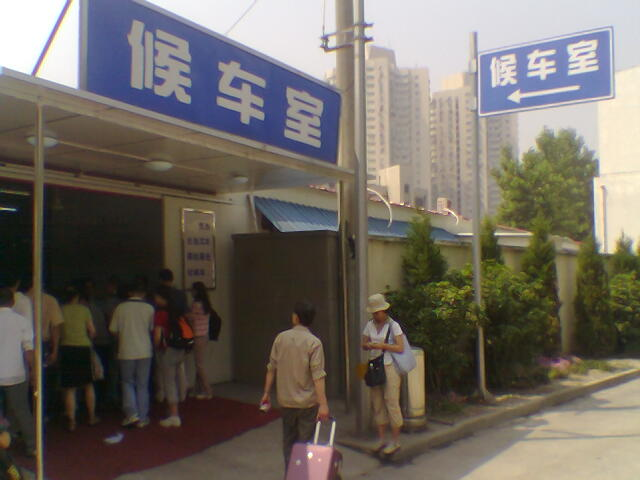
- Meilong station in 2006

General information
- Location: China
- Coordinates: 31°8′27.7″N 121°24′26.3″E

History
- Opened: 1909, rebuilt 1983
- Closed: 25 June 2006
Location

Meilong railway station (simplified Chinese: 梅陇站; traditional Chinese: 梅隴站; pinyin: Méilǒng zhàn) is a disused railway station in Shanghai. It closed permanently when the new Shanghai South railway station opened in 2006. It was located near Jinjiang Action Park, serving regular trains to and from Hangzhou.
