= Waihuanlu station =

Shanghai Metro station

Waihuanlu 外环路
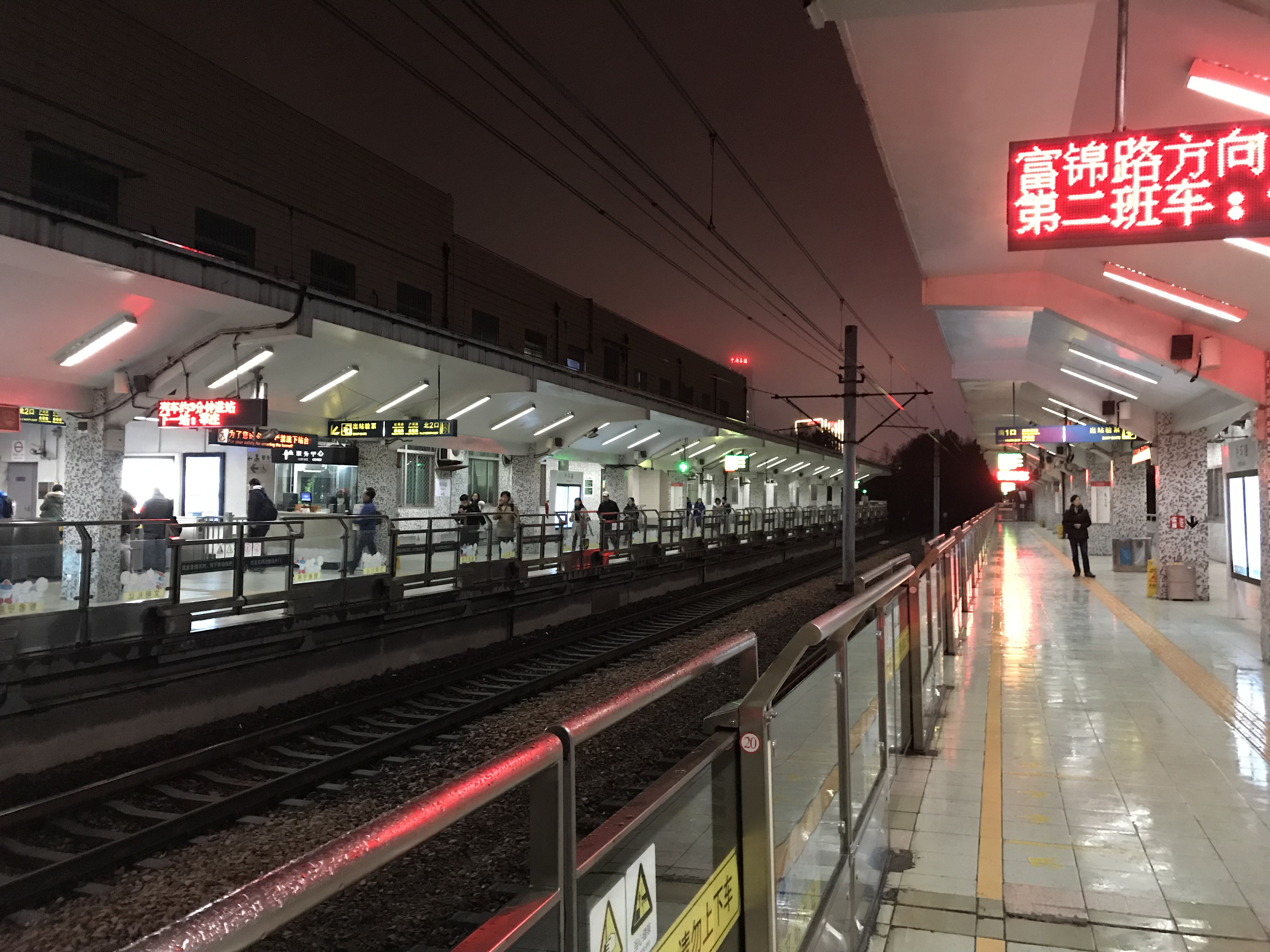
- Waihuanlu station in 2019

General information
- Location: Humin Road and Outer Ring Expressway; Minhang District, Shanghai; China
- Coordinates: 31°07′17″N 121°23′35″E
- Operator: Shanghai No. 1 Metro Operation Co. Ltd.
- Line: Line 1
- Platforms: 2 (2 side platforms)
- Tracks: 2

Construction
- Structure type: At-grade
- Accessible: Yes

Other information
- Station code: L01/02

History
- Opened: 28 December 1996

Services
Preceding station	Shanghai Metro	Following station
Lianhua Road towards Fujin Road	Line 1	Xinzhuang Terminus
Location
- Location within Shanghai

Waihuanlu (Chinese: 外环路; pinyin: Wàihuán Lù), literally Outer Ring Road, is a station on Line 1 of the Shanghai Metro. This station is part of the southern extension of that line that opened on 28 December 1996, and is located near the crossing of two major elevated highways. This makes the station often used by travelers to and from the southern outskirts of the city.

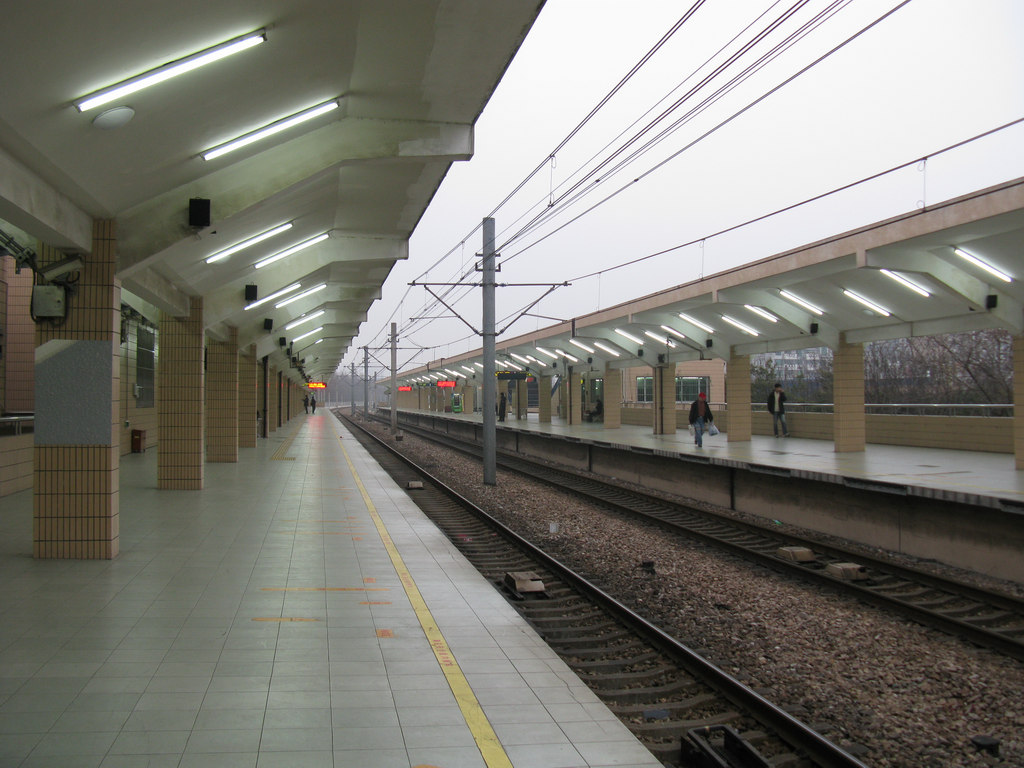
Waihuanlu station in 2009

== Exit list ==
Waihuanlu station is unlike other stations on the Shanghai Metro since it has north and south exits, which serve various purposes. Two main exits, from north and south of the station, give Fujin Road (Downtown) passengers access to an underground passageway. Two smaller exits serve the Fujin Road platform from the passageway. They are the No. 1 and 2 South Exits and are both open during peak hours to accommodate the high volume of commuters using the line. The No. 2 North Exit is the only area to access the Xinzhuang-bound train. However, it connects passengers directly to the platform without going underground.

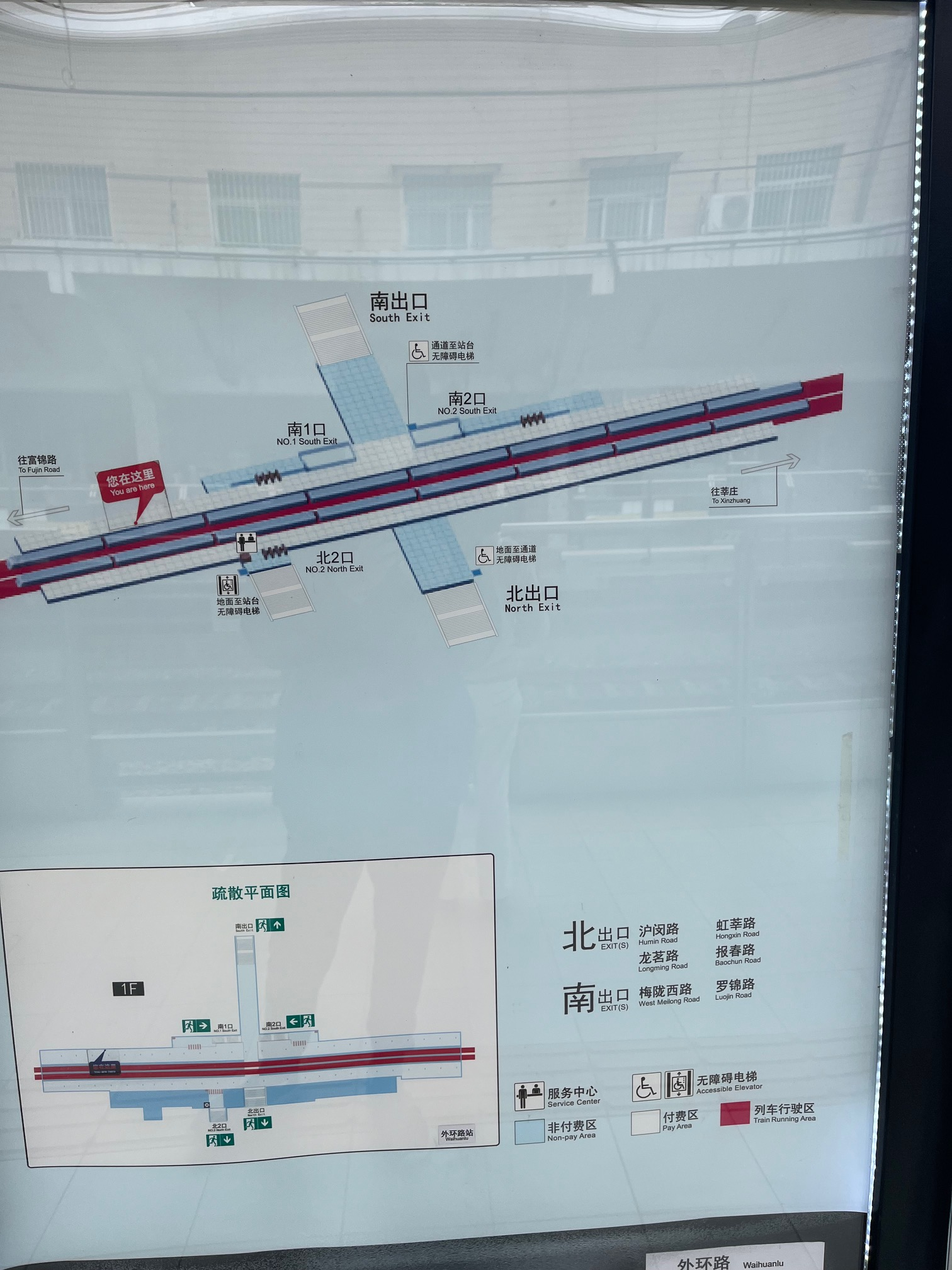
Waihuanlu station diagram on the northbound platform

Waihuanlu station Exit List
Exit No.	Location	Notes
North Exit♿	Humin Road, Hongxin Road, Longming Road, Baochun Road (via freeway overpass outside the exit)	Only accessible from the northbound platform via No. 1/2 South Exit
North 2nd Exit 🛗	Humin Road, Hongxin Road, Longming Road, Baochun Road (via freeway overpass outside the exit)	Only accessible from southbound platform
South Exit	West Meilong Road, Luojin Road	Only accessible from the northbound platform via No. 1/2 South Exit
Key:	With Wheelchair Lift: ♿	With Elevator: 🛗
