= Xinzhuang =

Xinzhuang can refer to the following locations:

== China ==
- Xinzhuang Station (Shanghai Metro)

Towns

- Xinzhuang, Shanghai (莘庄镇), town in Minhang District
- Xinzhuang Subdistrict (新庄街道), Yixing, Jiangsu

Written as "辛庄镇":

- Xinzhuang, Laiwu, in Laicheng District, Laiwu, Shandong
- Xinzhuang, Yantai, in Zhaoyuan, Shandong
- Xinzhuang, Tianjin, in Jinnan District

Written as "新庄镇":

- Xinzhuang, Anhui, in Xiao County
- Xinzhuang, Suqian, in Suyu District, Suqian, Jiangsu
- Xinzhuang, Jiangxi, in Yifeng County
- Xinzhuang, Jilin, in Yushu

Townships

Written as "辛庄乡"

- Xinzhuang Township, Jingxing County, Hebei
- Xinzhuang Township, Henan, in Fan County

== Taiwan ==
- Xinzhuang District (新莊區), New Taipei
- Xinzhuang, Zuoying (spelled as Sinjhuang by local government), subregion of Zuoying District, Kaohsiung
- Xinzhuang line, a metro branch line of Zhonghe-Xinlu Line, Taipei Metro
- Xinzhuang Station (Taipei Metro), a metro station in New Taipei
