= Jinjiang Action Park =

Amusement park in Shanghai, China

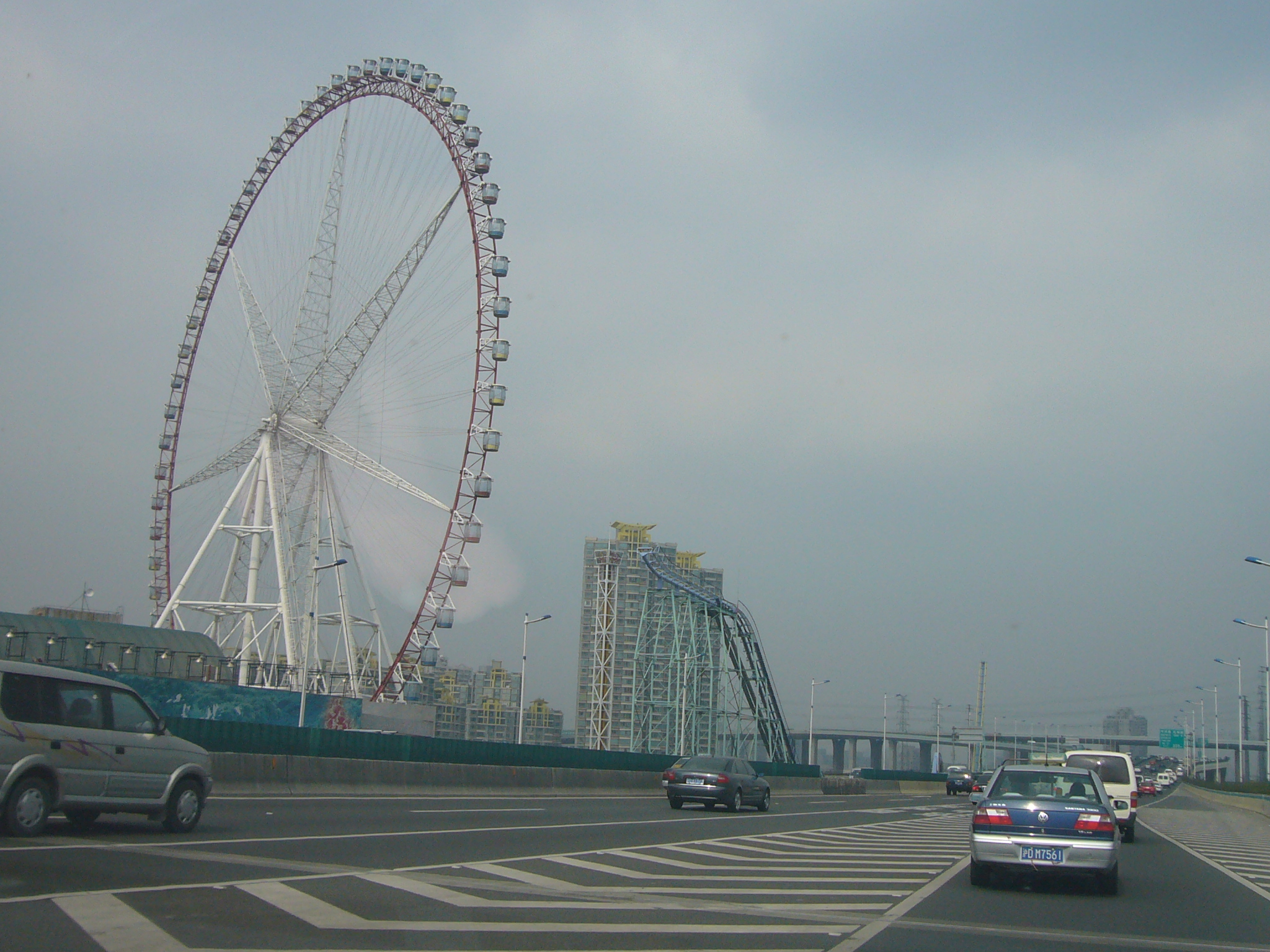
- Shanghai Ferris Wheel, at Jinjiang Action Park
- Interactive map of Jinjiang Action Park
- Location: Xuhui District, Shanghai
- Coordinates: 31°08′28″N 121°24′13″E
- Status: Operating
- Opened: 1984

Attractions
- Roller coasters: 5

Jinjiang Action Park (simplified Chinese: 锦江乐园; traditional Chinese: 錦江樂園; pinyin: Jǐnjiāng Lèyuán) is a large amusement park at No. 201 Hongmei Road in Xuhui District, Shanghai. Founded in 1984, it is affiliated to the Jinjiang Group.

Warner Bros. Discovery announced its intention Wednesday to build a Harry Potter Studio Tour in Shanghai. The company is partnering with Jinjiang Action Park, which made the news official on its WeChat account.

== Rides and attractions ==
=== Roller coasters ===
Name	Type	Manufacturer	Opened
Flying Raiders	Suspended roller coaster	Hebei H&S Amusement Equipment	December 2019
Giant Inverted Boomerang	Inverted shuttle roller coaster	Vekoma	30 September 2011
Karst Cave Coaster	Indoor powered roller coaster	Zamperla	≤ 2005
Moto Coaster	Motorbike roller coaster	Zamperla	2009
Roller Coaster	Shuttle roller coaster	Senyo Kogyo	1985

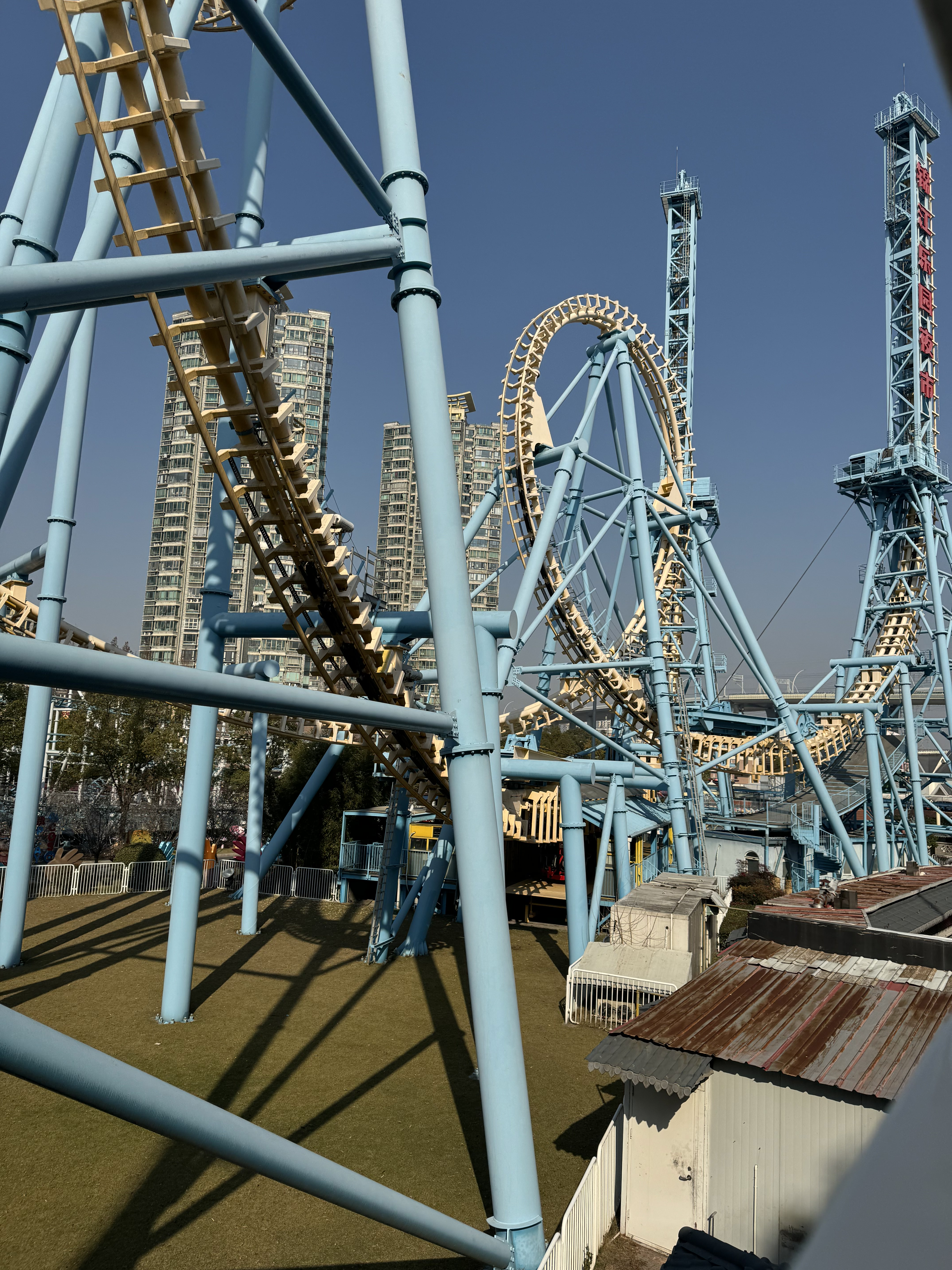
Giant Inverted Boomerang in 2023

=== Other attractions ===
Name	Type
Pirate Ship	Pirate ship (ride)
Horror House	Dark ride
Super Swing	Swing ride
Spinning Cup	Teacups
Volcano Theater	Amusement arcade
Joyland	Dark ride
Flume Ride	Log flume (ride)
Bumper Boats	Water ride
Layered Merry-go-around	Carousel
Moto Disco	Disk'O
Canyon Raft Ride	Water ride
Royal Scenery Raft	Water ride
Airship Around The World	Fire Ball
Jumpin Star	Drop tower
Power Surge	Swing ride
Crazy Wheel	Swing ride
Fly Kites in Spring	Swing ride
Bumper Cars	Bumper cars
Awesome Space Travelers	Swing ride
Tilt-A-Whirl	Caterpillar (ride)
Monorail	Monorail

== Shanghai Ferris Wheel ==
Shanghai Ferris Wheel
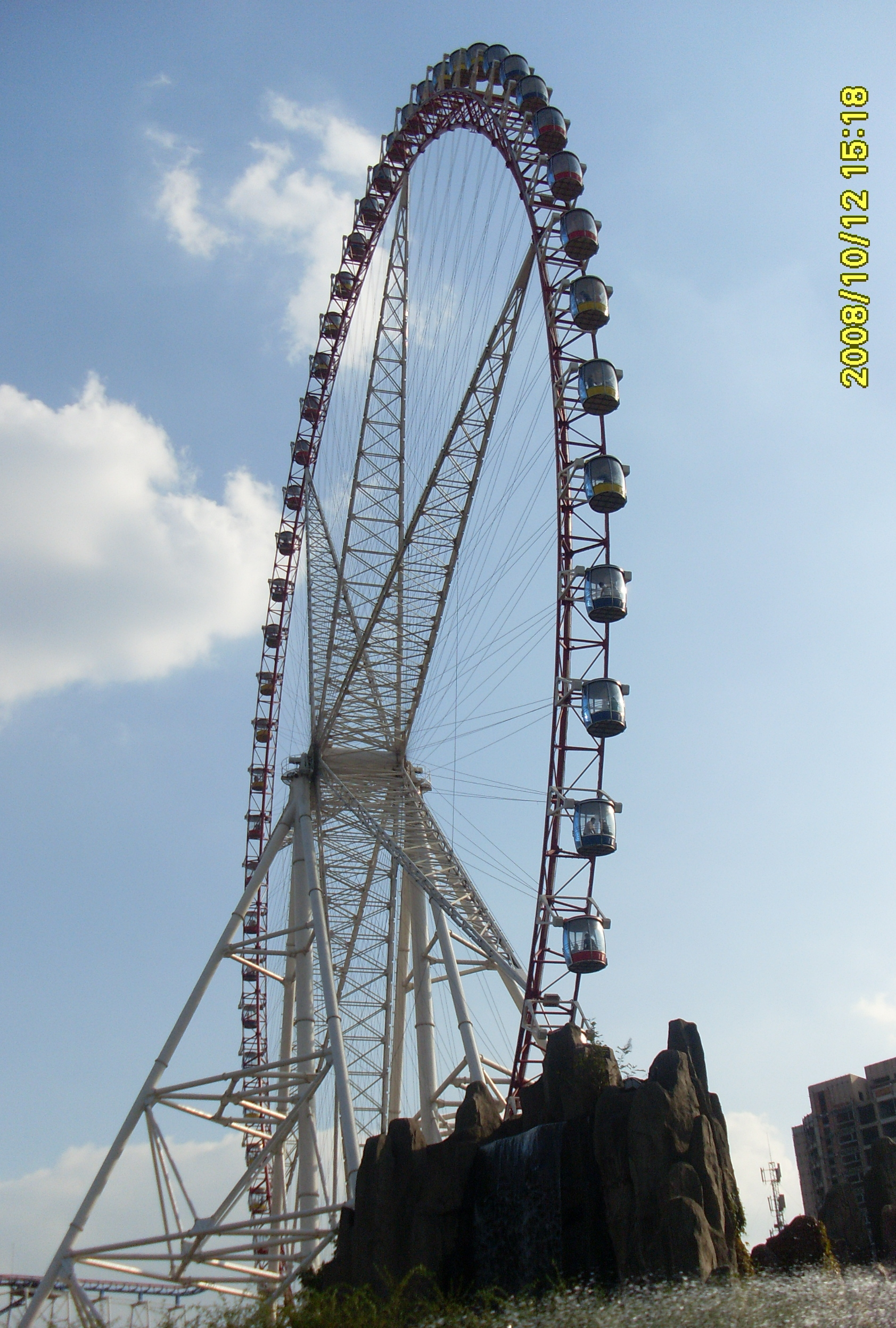
- Shanghai Ferris Wheel
- Interactive map of the Shanghai Ferris Wheel area

General information
- Type: Ferris wheel
- Location: Jinjiang Action Park, Shanghai, China

Height
- Height: 108 m (354 ft)

Jinjiang Action Park is the home of the Shanghai Ferris Wheel, a giant 108-metre (354 ft) tall Ferris wheel. The wheel has a diameter of 98 metres (322 ft), and takes about 20–25 minutes to complete one rotation.

Its 63-passenger cars can each carry 6 passengers who, on a clear day, can see the giant Oriental Pearl TV Tower in Pudong, the Songpu, Fengpu and Xupu bridges on the Huangpu River in the south, and Sheshan Hill in the west.

Construction started in November 2002 and it began operating in May 2003, having cost over 10 million yuan (US$1.2 million) to build.

== Transportation ==
The park can be reached by taking Shanghai Metro Line 1 to Jinjiang Park station.

Also, Hukun Expressway reach the park directly. As well, more than 20 bus routes have stops set up there.
