= Shanghai–Suzhou–Huzhou high-speed railway =

High-speed rail line in southeastern China

Shanghai–Suzhou–Huzhou high-speed railway 沪苏湖高速铁路
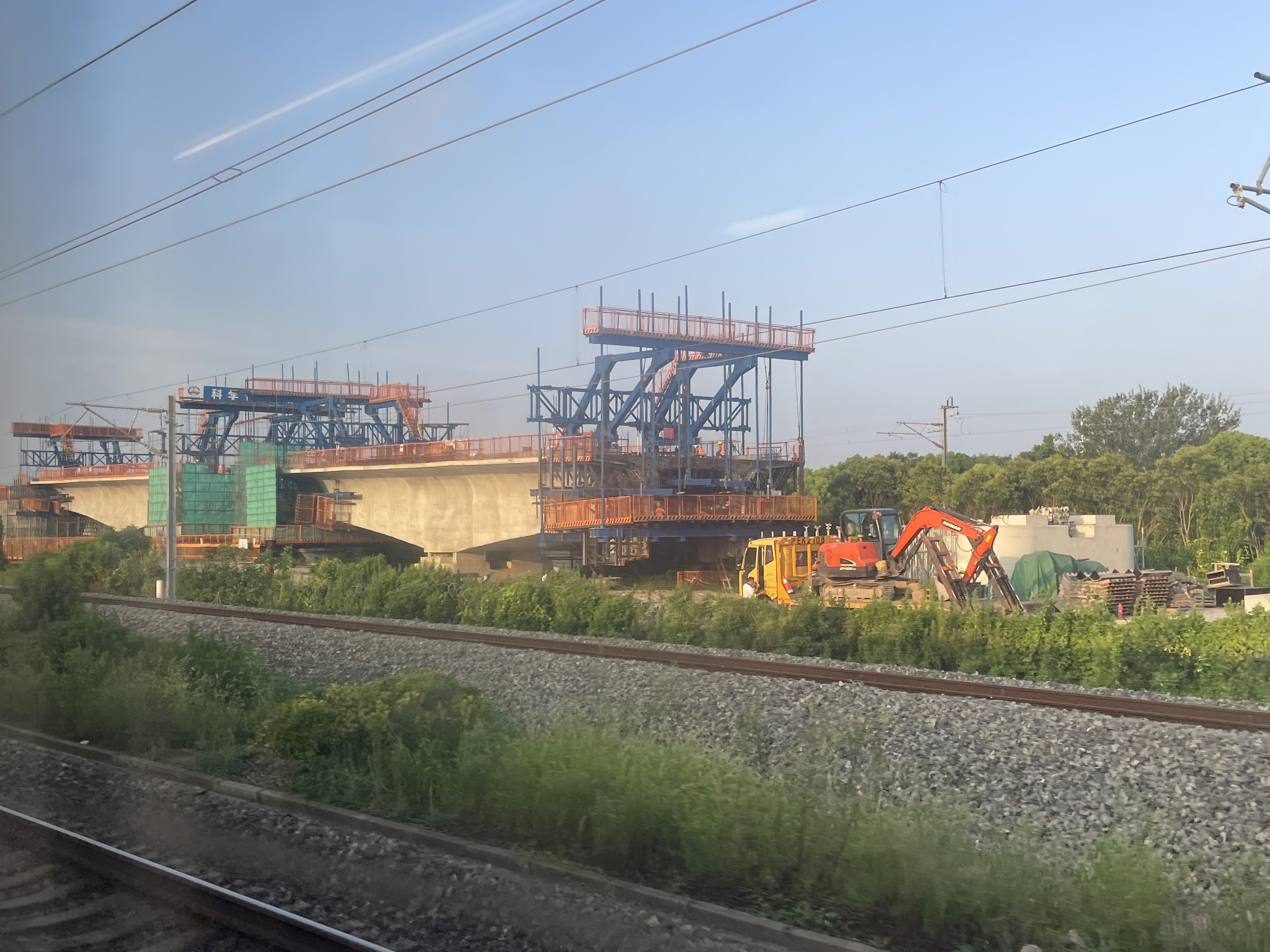

Overview
- Status: in operation as of 26 December 2024
- Locale: Shanghai, Jiangsu Province and Zhejiang Province, China
- Termini: Shanghai Hongqiao; Huzhou
- Stations: 8

Service
- Operator(s): China Railway Shanghai Group

Technical
- Line length: 163.8 km (101.8 mi)
- Track gauge: 1,435 mm (4 ft 8 1/2 in)
- Operating speed: 350 km/h (217 mph)

The Shanghai–Suzhou–Huzhou high-speed railway or Husuhu high-speed railway (沪苏湖高速铁路) is a high-speed railway in China connecting Shanghai with Huzhou. It opened in December 2024.

The line is approximately 164 kilometers long, with a design speed of 350 kilometers per hour. It has eight stations. The railway cuts the travel time between Shanghai and Huzhou from two hours to 43 minutes.

== History ==
Construction began in June 2020. It was put into operation on 26 December 2024. The two terminus stations preexisted the line, while the six intermediate stations were built for it.

Upon opening, the line operated 38 trains daily, with capacity for 229 trains.

== Stations ==
Station Name	Chinese	Metro transfers/connections
Shanghai Hongqiao	上海虹桥	2 10 17
Shanghai Songjiang	上海松江	9
Liantang	练塘	
Suzhou South	苏州南	
Shengze	盛泽	
Huzhou Nanxun	湖州南浔	
Huzhou East	湖州东	
Huzhou	湖州	
