= List of Art Deco buildings in Sydney =

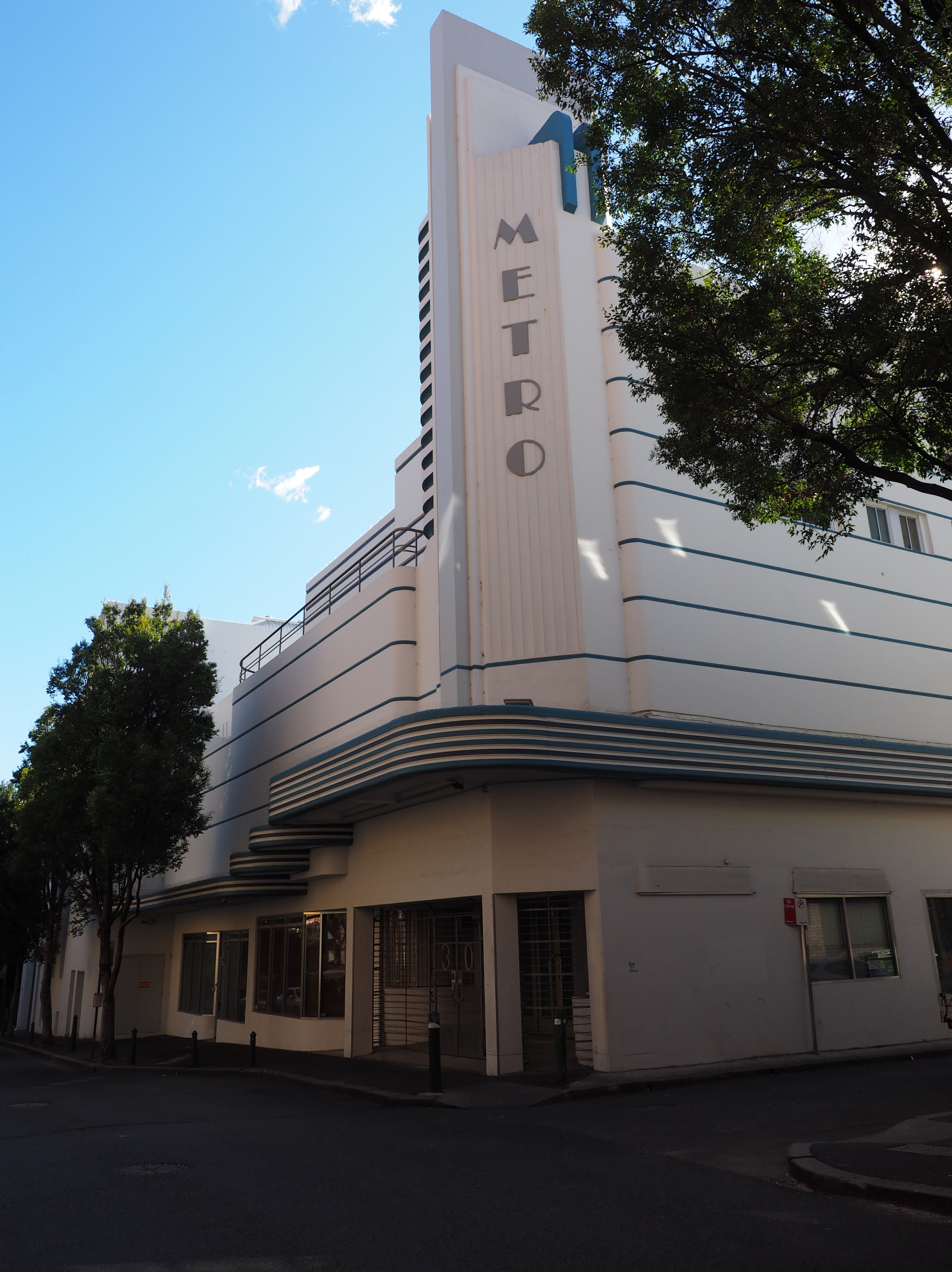
Minerva Theatre in Kings Cross (1939)

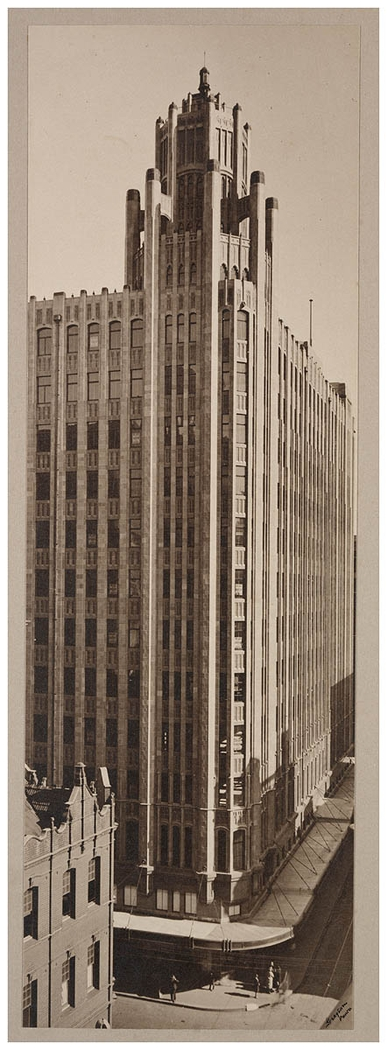
Grace Building (1930)

This is a list of buildings in Sydney completed in the Inter-War Art Deco, Streamline Moderne and Functionalist styles that are historically significant.

== Apartment and residential buildings ==
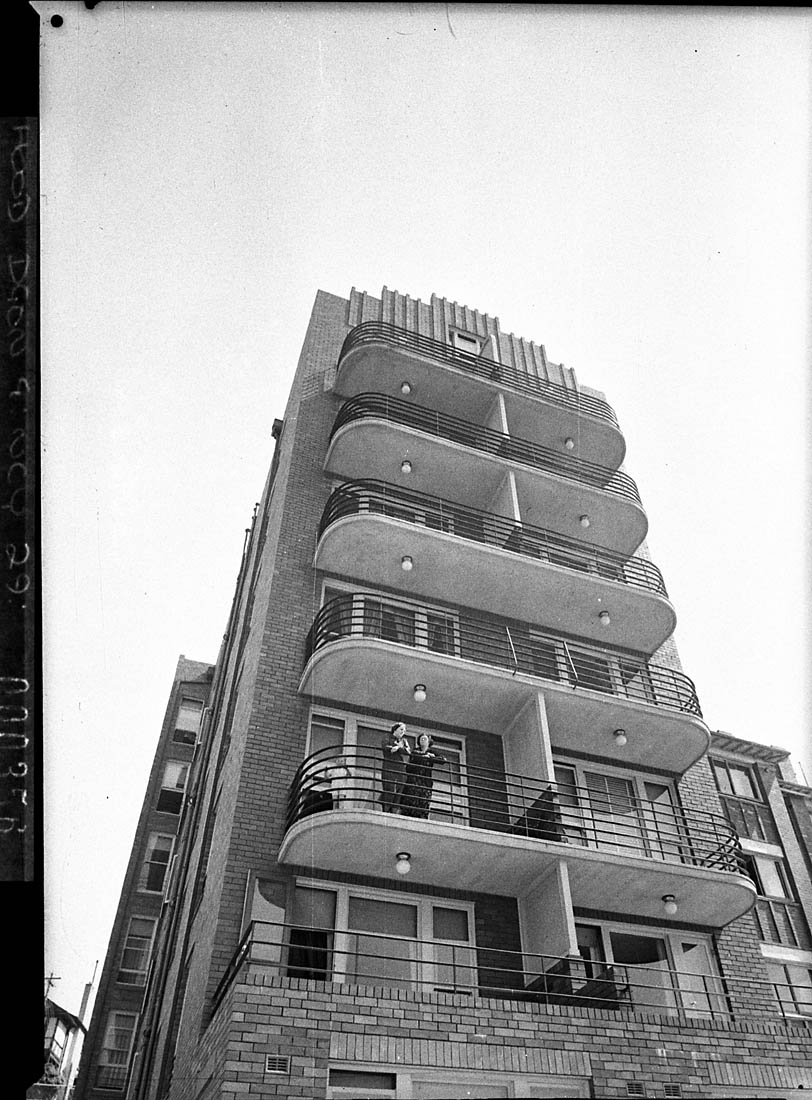
The Edgewater flats, 1937.

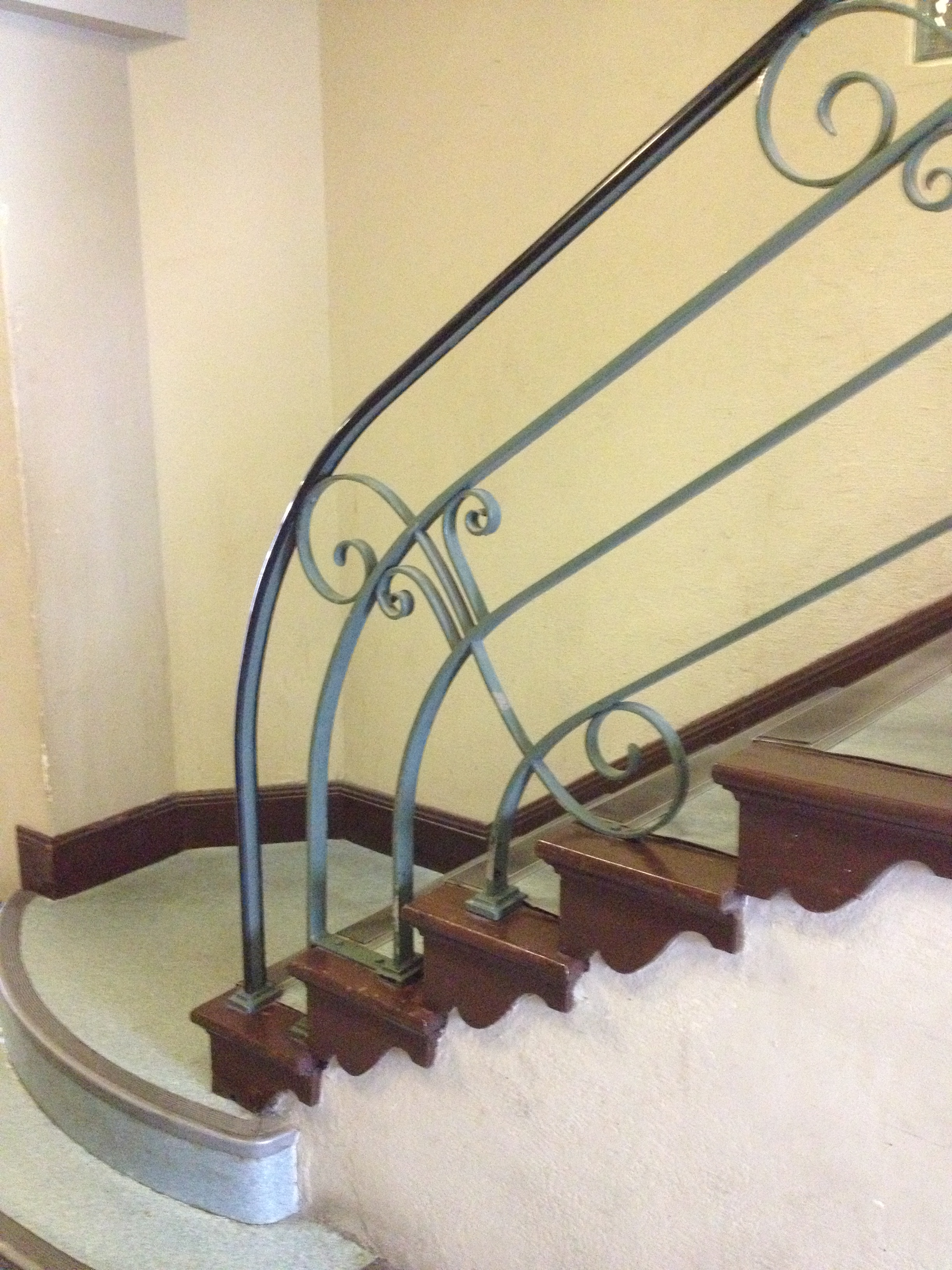
Staircase, Belgenny, Taylor Square

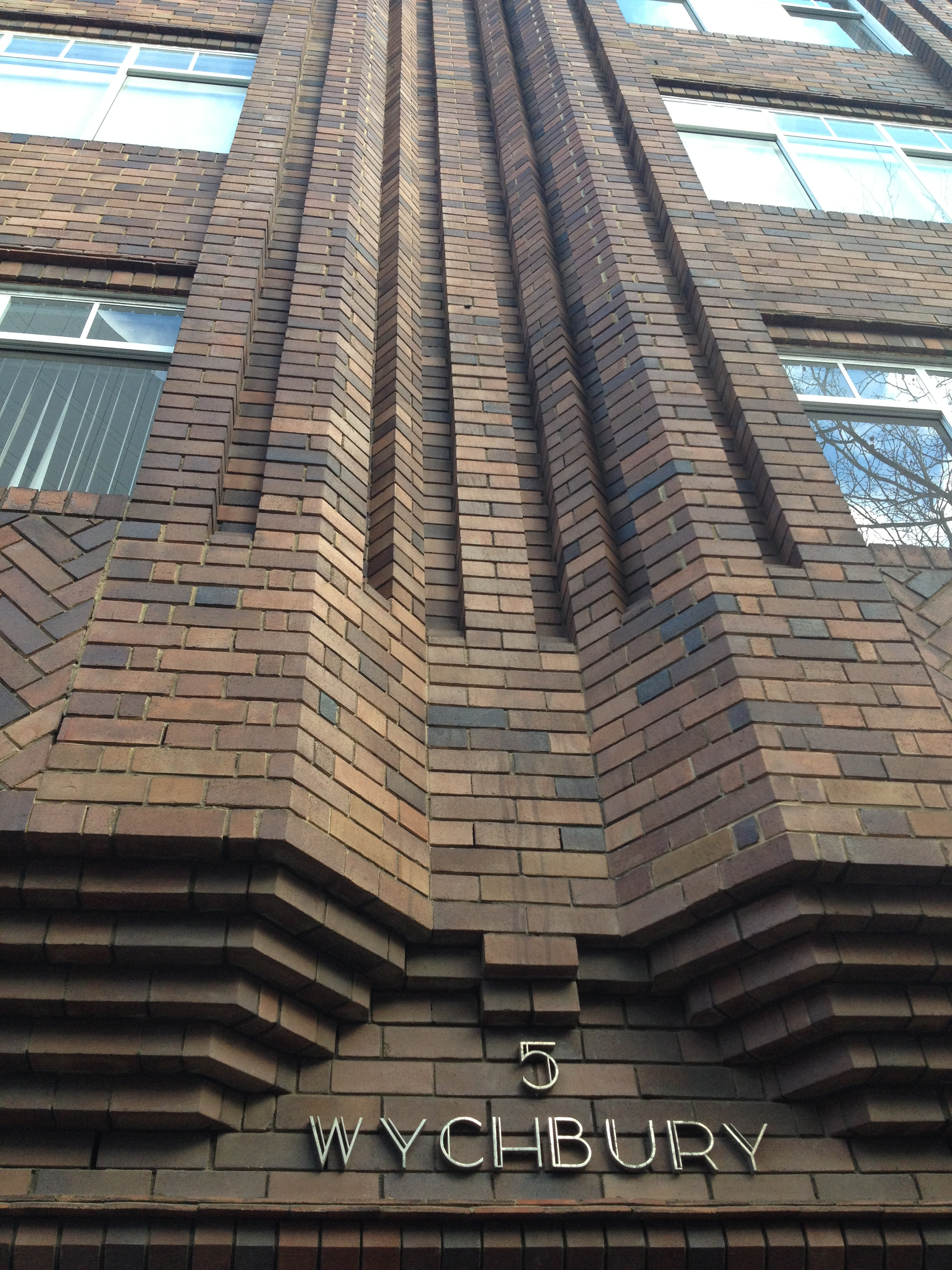
Entrance, Wychbury, Potts Point

- Adereham Hall, 71 Elizabeth Bay Road, Elizabeth Bay
- Belgenny, 389 Bourke Street, Surry Hills
- Billyard House, 21b Billyard Avenue, Elizabeth Bay
- Birtley Towers, 8 Birtley Place, Elizabeth Bay
- Cahors, 117 Macleay Street, Potts Point
- Caversham Court, 23 Billyard Avenue, Elizabeth Bay
- Chatsbury, 6 Ithaca Road, Elizabeth Bay
- Cherwood, 3 Barncleuth Square, Elizabeth Bay
- Claridge, 28–30 Flinders Street, Darlinghurst
- Edgewater, 6 Billyard Avenue, Elizabeth Bay
- Elston Court, 124 Shirley Road, Wollstonecraft
- Eltham, 18 Onslow Avenue, Elizabeth Bay
- Franconia (Sydney, Australia), Macleay Street, Potts Point
- Franklyn Court, 126 Shirley Road, Wollstonecraft
- Gowrie Gate, 115 Macleay Street, Potts Point
- Huntingdon, 8 Onslow Avenue, Elizabeth Bay
- Kanimbla Hall, 19–19a Tusculum Street, Potts Point
- Macleay Regis, 12 Macleay Street, Potts Point
- Mahratta, Wahroonga
- Marlborough Hall, 4 Ward Avenue, Elizabeth Bay
- Melrose, 23A Billyard Avenue, Elizabeth Bay
- Mont Clair, 347 Liverpool Street, Darlinghurst
- The Oxley, 12 Ward Avenue, Elizabeth Bay
- Park View, 7 St Neot Avenue, Potts Point
- Pembroke Hall, Onslow Place, Elizabeth Bay
- Royal Court, 227 Crown Street, Darlinghurst
- The Rutland, 381 Liverpool Street, Darlinghurst
- Somerset, 23 Billyard Avenue, Elizabeth Bay
- Tahoe, 67 Roslyn Street, Elizabeth Bay
- Tara, 3 Greenknowe Avenue, Elizabeth Bay
- Trent Bridge, 17 St Neot Avenue, Potts Point
- Werrington, 85 Macleay Street, Potts Point
- Winston, 2a Ithaca Road, Elizabeth Bay
- The Wroxton, 22 Roslyn Gardens, Elizabeth Bay
- Wychbury, 5 Manning Street, Potts Point
- 3 Onslow Place, Elizabeth Bay
- 7 Greenknowe Avenue, Elizabeth Bay
- 17 Wylde Street, Potts Point
- 17 Elizabeth Bay Road, Elizabeth Bay
- 20 Macleay Street, Potts Point

== Cinemas and theatres ==
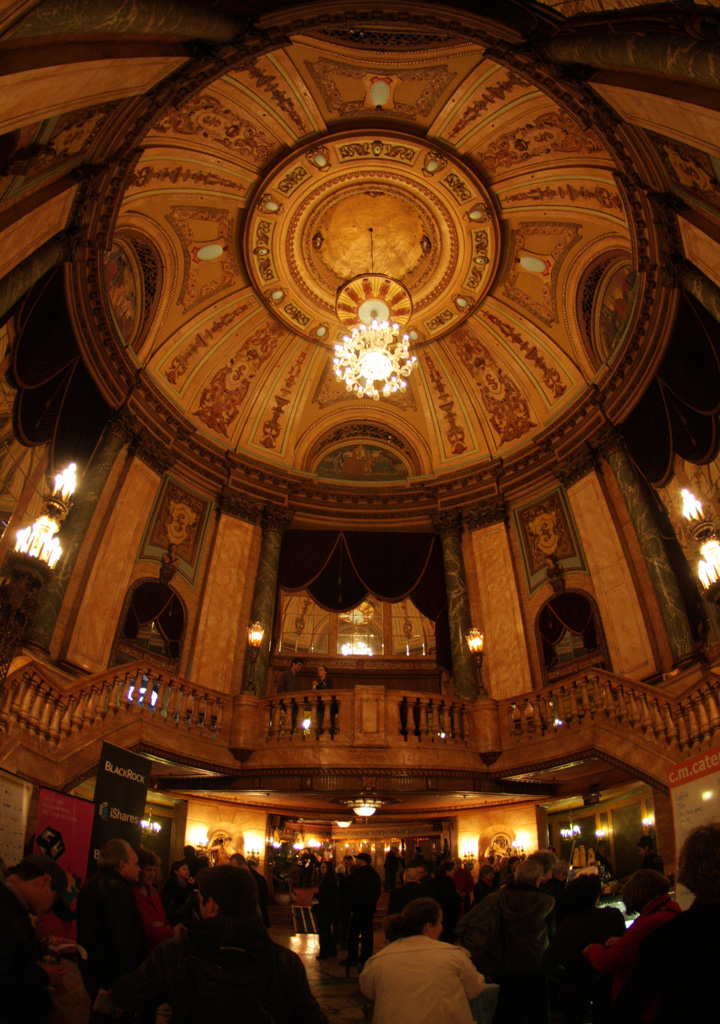
Atrium, State Theatre, Sydney

- Crest Cinema, Blaxcell Street, Granville
- Enmore Theatre, 118–132 Enmore Road, Newtown
- Hayden Orpheum, Military Road, Cremorne
- Minerva Theatre, Orwell Street, Potts Point
- Niterider Theatre Restaurant, 55–57 Parramatta Road, Homebush
- Paris Theatre (demolished), Liverpool Street, Sydney
- Ritz Cinema, 45 St Pauls Street, Randwick
- State Theatre Building, Market Street, Sydney
- United Cinemas, Collaroy Beach, 1097 Pittwater Road, Collaroy
- Valhalla Cinema, (old Astor), Glebe

== Cultural buildings ==
- Museum of Contemporary Art, Circular Quay, Sydney
- North Sydney Olympic Pool, Milsons Point

== Hotels and pubs ==
- Albury Hotel, Oxford St & Barcom Ave, Darlinghurst
- Australian Hotel, Broadway & Abercrombie St Chippendale
- Blue's Point Hotel, Blue's Point Rd & French St McMahon's Point
- Botany View Hotel, King & Darley Sts Newtown
- Bridge Hotel, Victoria Rd & Wellington St Rozelle
- Canterbury Hotel, Canterbury Rd & Tincombe St Canterbury
- Charing Cross Hotel, Carrington Rd & Victoria St, Waverley
- Century Hotel (former), George & Liverpool Sts Sydney
- Civic Hotel, Pitt & Goulburn Sts Sydney
- County Clare Hotel, Broadway & Kensington St Chippendale
- Criterion Hotel, Park & Pitt Sts Sydney
- Golden Sheaf Hotel, 429 New South Head Rd Double Bay
- Erskineville Hotel, Erskineville Rd & Septimus St Erskineville
- Golden Barley Hotel, Edgeware Rd & Llewellyn St Enmore
- Grose Farm Hotel (now the Alfred Hotel), Missenden Rd & Dunblane St Camperdown
- Imperial Hotel, Erskineville Rd & Union St Erskineville
- Henson Park Hotel, Illawarra Rd & Chapel St Marrickville
- Horse & Jockey Hotel, Parramatta Rd & Knight St Hombush
- Hotel Broadway, Broadway & Shepherd St Chippendale
- Hotel Hollywood, Hunt & Foster Sts Surry Hills
- Hunter's Hill Hotel, Gladesville Rd & Joubert St Hunter's Hill
- Hurstville Hotel, Forest Rd & McMahon St Hurstville
- Kauri Foreshore Hotel, Pyrmont Bridge Rd & Bellevue St Glebe
- Kirribilli Hotel, Broughton St & Crescent Ln Kirribilli
- Kurrajong Hotel, Swanson & Park Sts Erskineville
- Light Brigade Hotel, Oxford St & Jersey Rd Paddington
- Marlborough Hotel, King St & Missenden Rd Newtown
- Marrickville Hotel, Marrickville & Illawarra Rds Marrickville
- North Annandale Hotel, 105 Johnson Street, Annandale
- Petersham Inn, Parramatta Rd & Phillip St Petersham
- Pier Hotel, Botany Rd & Excell St Banksmeadow
- Pymble Hotel, 1134 Pacific Hwy Pymble
- Robin Hood Hotel, 203 Bronte Rd Waverley
- Rose, Shamrock & Thistle Hotel, 27 Oxford St Paddington
- Rosebery Hotel, Botany & Epsom Rds Rosebery
- Rozelle Hotel, 118 Victoria Rd Rozelle
- Royal Hotel, Railway Pde & Jubilee St Carlton
- Royal Hotel, 484 Princes Hwy Rockdale
- Royal Oak Hotel, 50 Railway St Lidcombe
- Royal Sheaf Hotel, Hume Hwy & Burwood Rd Burwood
- Tea Gardens Hotel, 2–4 Bronte Rd Bondi Junction
- Tennyson Hotel, Botany Rd & High St Mascot
- The Lakes Hotel, Gardeners Rd & Macquarie St Rosebery
- Unicorn Hotel, Oxford & Hopewell Sts Paddington
- Union Hotel, King & Union Sts Newtown
- Union Hotel, Pacific Hwy & West St North Sydney
- United Australia Hotel (now Sydney Park Hotel), King & Lord Sts St Peters
- Vauxhall Inn, Parramatta Rd & Woodville Rd Granville
- Westminster Hotel, Broadway & Regent St Chippendale

== Institutional buildings and facilities ==
- Concord Repatriation Hospital, Concord
- Dental Hospital of Sydney, Elizabeth Street, Surry Hills
- King George V Memorial Hospital, Missenden Road, Camperdown
- St Margaret's Hospital, Bourke Street, Surry Hills

== Office buildings ==
- AMA House, Sydney, Macquarie Street, Sydney
- Asbestos House, 65 York Street, Sydney
- Australian Catholic Insurance Building, York Street, Sydney
- Amalgamated Wireless Australia (AWA) Building, York Street, Sydney
- Berlei House, Regent Street, Chippendale
- Challis House, Martin Place, Sydney
- City Mutual Life Assurance Building, Hunter Street, Sydney
- Commonwealth Bank Building, Roseville, Sydney
- Commonwealth Bank Building, North Strathfield, Sydney
- Commonwealth Trading Bank Building, Martin Place, Sydney
- Grace Building, York Street, Sydney
- Kyle House, Macquarie Place, Sydney
- Mutual Life & Citizens Building, Martin Place, Sydney
- Overseas Union Bank Building, Martin Place, Sydney
- Rural Bank Building (1936–1983), Martin Place Sydney
- Sydney Water Head Office, Bathurst Street, Sydney; under redevelopment as part of the Greenland Centre Sydney
- Transport House, York Street, Sydney
- Wynyard House, York Street, Sydney

== Public buildings and facilities ==
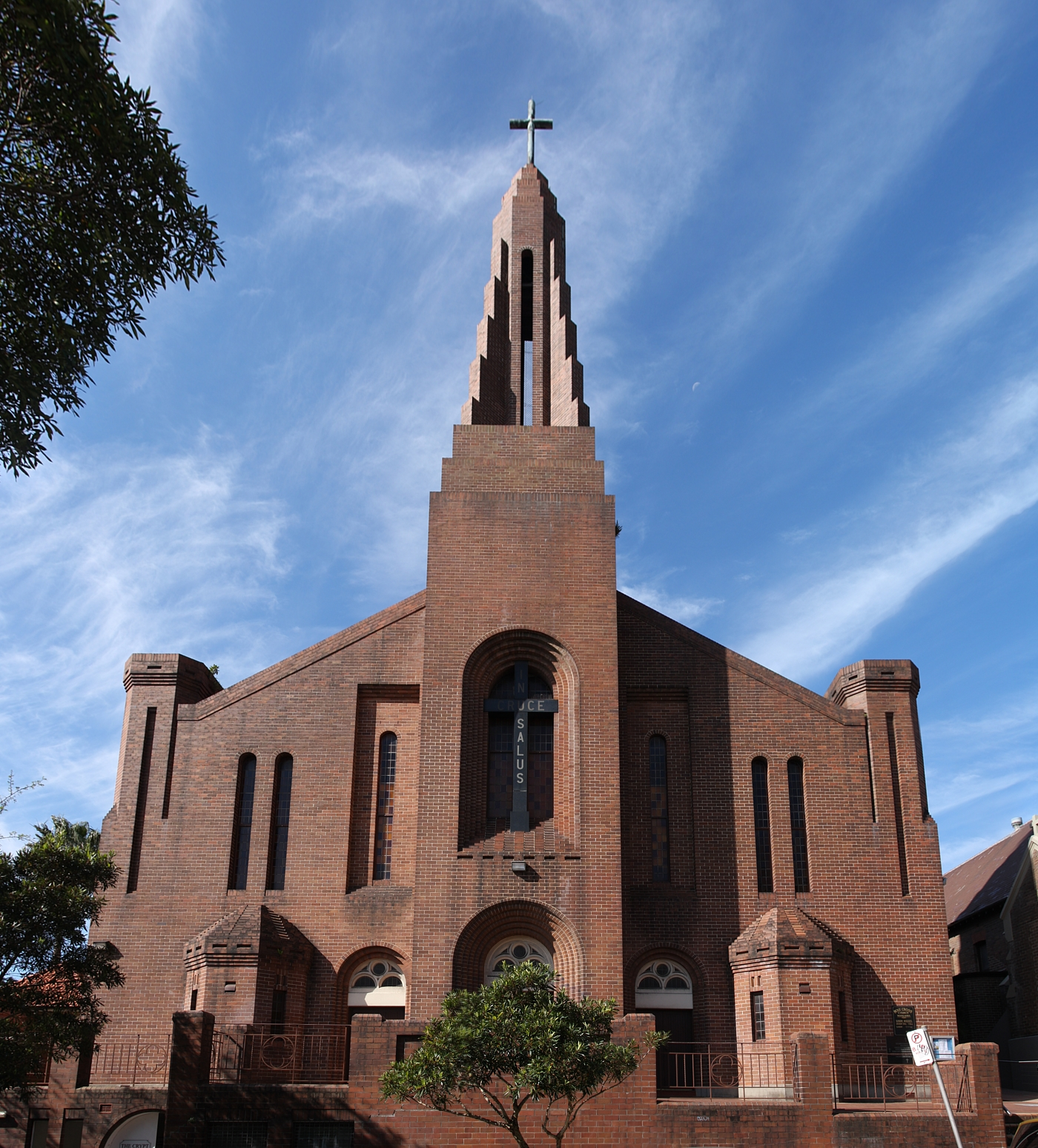
Holy Cross Church, Adelaide Street (designed by Austin Mackay)

- ANZAC War Memorial, Hyde Park, Sydney
- Archibald Fountain, Hyde Park, Sydney
- Erskineville Town Hall
- King George VI Memorial, Hyde Park, Sydney
- Petersham Town Hall
- Rockdale Town Hall
- St Peters Town Hall

== Religious buildings ==
- Holy Cross Church, Woollahra
- Sydney Chevra Kadisha, Oxford Street, Woollahra

== See also ==
- List of Art Deco architecture
- List of Art Deco architecture in Oceania
