= Columbus Tower =

Columbus Tower may refer to:

- Columbus Tower (London), United Kingdom
- Columbus Tower (San Francisco), California

== See also ==
- Torres de Colón (Columbus Towers), Madrid, Spain
