= Gowrie Gate =

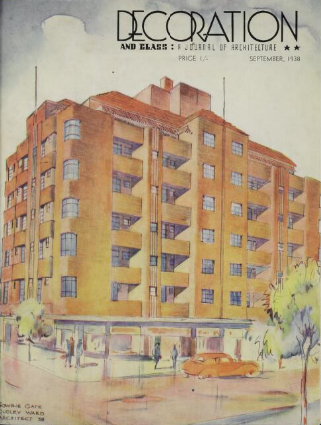
Gowrie Gate Building on the cover of Decoration & Glass. 1 September 1938.

Gowrie Gate is an Art Deco building located at 115 Macleay Street, Potts Point, Sydney, Australia. Situated on the south-west corner of Macleay Street and Orwell Street it was designed by Architect, Dudley Ward and built by S.D.C. Kennedy & Bird Pty. Ltd with building works completed in 1938. The building was sold in its entirety for £80,000 in 1939. The spread of flats in the 1920s and 30s was one of the most marked developments in Sydney housing. Flat development was booming along with population and the area exhibited a concentration of Sydney buildings designed in the Art Deco style. Ward's influential designs for both this building and The Wroxton apartments (1936, Roslyn Gardens), looked to European experiments, picking up on innovations in public housing in Germany and Holland. The building consists of 7 floors and a basement. It is constructed in an Art Deco style from red textured brick. When completed the building consisted of 53 self contained flats, four penthouses, two professional suites and six shops facing Macleay Street and Orwell Streets. The building originally featured a number of open balconies on the Orwell Street facade, but many of these have been infilled over the years to provide more living space. The entry foyer and ground floor retains some original features such as a large hanging lantern (to match exterior bracket lanterns) along with sections of original walnut paneling. Although not heritage listed the building is a contributory item within the Potts Point/Elizabeth Bay Heritage Conservation Area.
