= Shanghai Construction Group =

Chinese construction and engineering firm

Shanghai Construction Group Corporation
- Company type: State-owned enterprise
- Industry: Civil engineering
- Founded: 1994
- Headquarters: Shanghai, China
- Owner: Shanghai Municipal Government
- Parent: Shanghai SASAC
- Subsidiaries: Shanghai Construction Group Co., Ltd. (30.19%) (Note: Shanghai Municipal Government owned an additional 24.01% shares of the listed company via Guosheng Group)
- Website: www.scg.com.cn

Shanghai Construction Group Corporation
- Simplified Chinese: 上海建工（集团）总公司
- Traditional Chinese: 上海建工（集團）總公司
Transcriptions
Standard Mandarin
- Hanyu Pinyin: Shànghǎi Jiàn Gōng (Jítuán) Zǒnggōngsī

Shanghai Construction
- Simplified Chinese: 上海建工
- Traditional Chinese: 上海建工
Transcriptions
Standard Mandarin
- Hanyu Pinyin: Shànghǎi Jiàn Gōng

Shanghai Construction (Group) Corporation (SCG) is a Chinese construction and engineering company, ranked as the 16th largest construction company in the world based on 2011 revenues.

The group's listed arm Shanghai Construction Group Co., Ltd. (SSE: 600170, Chinese: 上海建工集团股份有限公司; lit. 'Shanghai Construction Group', 'Company Limited by Shares'), was ranked at 1,096th on Forbes Global 2000 List, with a market cap of US$5.5 billion (as of May 2017).

The listed company was a constituent of SSE 180 Index and its sub-index SSE MidCap Index.

== History ==
In the 1990s the company underwent fast-paced growth as the home city of Shanghai was finally allowed to join in the reform and growth sweeping China. The city became a "builder's dream" and SCG benefited from the pent up zeal for projects with revenue climbing up 30% annually. As the hometown builder, SCG is responsible for many of the landmarks of Shanghai including Shanghai Tower.

== International projects ==
SCG undertakes overseas construction projects and mining in Eritrea. It has an international focused subsidiary, the Shanghai (Group) Corporation for Foreign Economic & Technological Cooperation (SEFCO Group).

The company's construction of a five star hotel in Cairo despite local political instability was cited by the New York Times in 2012 as an example of the endurance Chinese companies had in their bid to establish operations in Egypt.

In February 2014, Shanghai Construction Group was awarded a contract for a sewage tunnelling project in Edmonton, Canada. The $11-million bid marked the first time that a Chinese firm had done tunnelling work in North America.

In 2014, the company was also contracted by the Tanzanian Ministry of Defence and National Service to construct 12,000 housing units for the Tanzanian Peoples' Defence Force (TPDF) in a project financed by a $550m loan from the Exim Bank of China.

Through an American subsidiary, the Group bought the Hyatt Regency Orange County hotel for $137 million in 2015, following a trend in which Chinese state owned construction firms are increasingly investing in overseas real estate.

== Mining activities ==
Shanghai Construction Group is also involved in international mining operations. In December 2011, its subsidiary, the Shanghai (Group) Corporation for Foreign Economic & Technological Cooperation (SEFCO Group), acquired a 60% stake in the Zara gold mine in Eritrea for US$80 million. The acquisition marked a diversification of SCG's international portfolio, which previously focused primarily on construction and engineering.

The Zara gold project, located near the capital city of Asmara, was developed as part of Eritrea's efforts to attract foreign investment in its natural resource sector. The mine was expected to produce approximately 104,000 ounces of gold annually during its early production phase.

== See also ==
- Shanghai Municipal Investment Group
- Shanghai Jiushi Group
