= Shanghai Municipal Investment Group =

Chinese state-owned investment firm

- Formerly: Chinese: 上海市城市建设投资开发总公司
- Type: State-owned enterprise
- Industry: Real Estate; infrastructure
- Founded: 21 July 1992; 34 years ago
- Founder: Shanghai Municipal People's Government
- Headquarters: Shanghai, China
- Key people: Jiang Shujie (Chairman & Party Committee Secretary)
- Products: commercial property; toll road; water supply
- Owner: Shanghai Municipal People's Government (100%)
- Parent: Shanghai SASAC
- Subsidiaries: SMI Holding (46.46%)
- Website: www.chengtou.com

Shanghai Municipal Investment (Group) Corporation
- Simplified Chinese: 上海城投（集团）有限公司
- Literal meaning: Shanghai Municipal Investment (Group) Co., Ltd.
Transcriptions
Standard Mandarin
- Hanyu Pinyin: Shànghǎi chéngtóu (jítuán) yǒuxiàn gōngsī

Shanghai Chengtou
- Simplified Chinese: 上海城投
- Literal meaning: Shanghai Municipal Investment
Transcriptions
Standard Mandarin
- Hanyu Pinyin: Shànghǎi chéngtóu

Shanghai Municipal Investment (Group) Corporation, (Note: Chinese: 上海市城市建设投资开发总公司) also known as Shanghai Chengtou, (Note: Chinese: 上海城投) is a municipal wealth fund of the Shanghai Municipal People's Government. It is one of the major shareholders of Greenland Holdings (for 20.55% shares), as well as another listed company Shanghai SMI Holding (SSE: 600649). The group owned a minority interest (33.43% stake) in Shentong Metro Group.

The group is the investor of Shanghai Yangtze River Bridge, under a subsidiary (Chinese: 上海城投公路投资集团) for 60% stake directly and 40% indirectly (via Chinese: 上海公路建设). SMI Holding was a constituent of SSE 180 Index and its sub-index SSE MidCap Index.

== History ==
In September 2023, the Shanghai Municipal Investment Group announced that an internal department for local militia liaison would be established in the company and run by the People's Liberation Army's Shanghai garrison.

== Subsidiaries ==
As of 31 December 2016

- Shanghai SMI Holding (46.46%)
- Chinese: 上海城投公路投资集团; lit. 'SMI Road Investment Group' (100%)
  - Shanghai Yangtze River Tunnel and Bridge Construction and Development (100%)
  - Chinese: 上海公路建设; lit. 'Shanghai Road Construction' (100%)
- Shanghai SMI Water Group (Chinese: 上海城投水务集团) (100%)
- Shanghai SMI Assets Group (Chinese: 上海城投资产管理集团) (100%)
- Chinese: 上海前卫实业 (100%)
- Shanghai SMI Environmental Industry (Chinese: 上海环境实业) (100%)
- Chinese: 上海中心大厦建设发展; lit. 'Shanghai Tower Construction & Development' (51%)
- Shanghai Laogang Waste Utilization (Chinese: 上海老港固废综合开发) (100%)
- Chinese: 上海长兴岛开发建设; lit. 'Changxing Island Development & Construction' (100%)
- Chinese: 上海城投环保产业投资管理 (100%)
- Chinese: 上海城投航道建设 (100%)
- SMI USA, a U.S. subsidiary

== Equity interests and Investments ==
As of 31 December 2016

- Bright Food (22.06%)
- Greenland Holdings (20.55%)
- Shentong Metro Group (33.43%)
  - Shanghai Shentong Metro Co., Ltd. (1.75% via SMI Holding, excluding shares owned by Shentong Metro Group)
- Western Securities (15.09% via SMI Holding)

SMI partnered with American Extell Development to build the $3 billion Central Park Tower in New York City, which was finished in December 2021. In March 2023, an consortium of firms including SMI started building a $2.8 billion skyscraper in Puxi, Shanghai. The building is planned to be finished in 2030.

== See also ==
- Shanghai Construction Group
- Shanghai Jiushi Group
- Central Park Tower
