= Columbus Tower (London) =

Coordinates: 51.50715°N 0.02459°W

- Artist's impression with Columbus Tower on left and three existing tall buildings on right
- Interactive map of Columbus Tower

General information
- Status: Never built
- Location: London, E14; United Kingdom, 2 Hertsmere Road
- Client: Commercial Estates Group for and on behalf of GMV Ten Ltd

Height
- Roof: 237 metres (778 ft)

Technical details
- Floor count: 65
- Floor area: 93,423 m^{2} (1,005,600 sq ft)

Design and construction
- Architects: Concept: DMWR Architects; Design: Mark Weintraub Architecture & Design

Columbus Tower was a planned high-rise development by Commercial Estates Group approved for construction on a site on the Isle of Dogs, London Borough of Tower Hamlets. The 63-storey, 242 m (794 ft) AOD (Above Ordnance Datum) tower would have been located on a 0.36-hectare site at the western end of the north dock at West India Quay. At 2009 projected cost was £450M to build and reaching 237 metres in height, and projected was taller only by 2 m than One Canada Square.

== Planning ==
The mixed-used scheme, designed by DMWR Architects LLP, included 30,871 m^{2} (332,290 sq ft) of office space, a 192-room hotel, 74 serviced apartments, a rooftop bar and a restaurant, as well as a large health and fitness club, significant retail space and a publicly accessible Winter Garden at ground level.

Columbus Tower would have joined an existing cluster of high-rise development at Canary Wharf. Located at a high footfall transport interchange hub, the proposed tower’s location was directly above the site earmarked for the approach tunnels to the new Crossrail station at Canary Wharf.

In December 2008, a planning application was submitted to the London Borough of Tower Hamlets. This application was virtually identical to application granted full consent in March 2005. Tower Hamlets councillors initially rejected the second application, but Conservative Mayor of London Boris Johnson exercised new powers allowing him to intervene and take over the application, and on 7 October 2009 he granted conditional planning permission and conservation area consent for the scheme.

In March 2011 Commercial Estates Group (CEG) announced that they had appointed Squire and Partners to review the proposals. In November 2013 it was reported that Commercial Estates Group had sold the site to Ryan Corporation (UK) Limited for £100M and that a planning application for a new, residential building would be made. It was subsequently reported that no such sale had taken place. The site was subsequently sold by CEG to Chinese state-owned developer Greenland Group in September 2014 for approximately £100M. A new planning application (PA/15/02675/A1) for the site with a building to be called Hertsmere House was approved by Tower Hamlets in February 2016. The development name has since changed to Spire London.

== See also ==
- Tall buildings in London
