= Shanghai Jiushi Group =

State-owned company in Shanghai

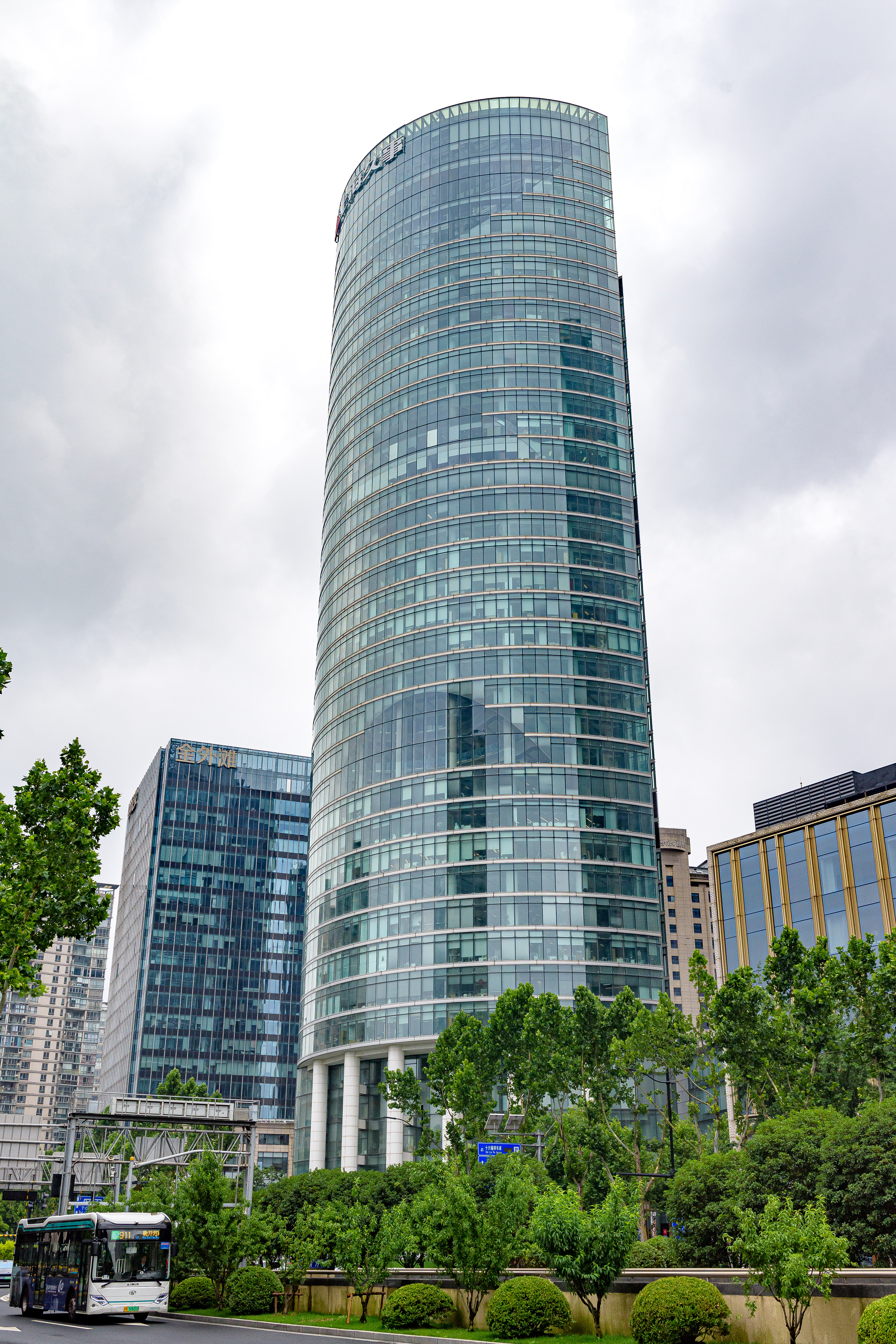
- Headquarters
- Formerly: Shanghai Jiushi Corporation
- Company type: state-owned enterprise
- Industry: holding company
- Founded: 12 December 1987
- Founder: Shanghai Municipal People's Government
- Headquarters: Jiushi Tower, 28 Zhongshan Rd (S), Shanghai, China
- Area served: Shanghai
- Revenue: CN¥18.6 billion (2015)
- Operating income: (CN¥14.9 billion) (2015)
- Net income: ▲CN¥559.0 million (2015)
- Total assets: ▲CN¥405.1 billion (2015)
- Total equity: ▲CN¥132.6 billion (2015)
- Owner: Shanghai Government (100%)
- Website: www.jiushi.com.cn
- Footnotes / references in a consolidated basis

Shanghai Jiushi (Group) Co., Ltd.
- Simplified Chinese: 上海久事（集团）有限公司
- Traditional Chinese: 上海久事（集團）有限公司
Transcriptions
Standard Mandarin
- Hanyu Pinyin: Shànghǎi jiǔshì (jítuán) yǒuxiàn gōngsī

Shanghai Jiushi
- Simplified Chinese: 上海久事
- Traditional Chinese: 上海久事
Transcriptions
Standard Mandarin
- Hanyu Pinyin: Shànghǎi jiǔshì

Jiushi Group
- Simplified Chinese: 久事集团
- Traditional Chinese: 久事集團
Transcriptions
Standard Mandarin
- Hanyu Pinyin: jiǔshì jítuán

Shanghai Jiushi (Group) Co., Ltd. is a Chinese state-owned enterprise. It was supervised by the State-owned Assets Supervision and Administration Commission (SASAC) of the Shanghai Municipal People's Government.

Jiushi is the parent of several public transport companies of Shanghai, including the operator of Shanghai Public Transport Card, as well as equity investments in several listed companies based in Shanghai. The company also has a subsidiary that was the organizer of Chinese Grand Prix which was held in Shanghai International Circuit.

== History ==
In 1986, Shanghai Government was allowed to use a maximum of US$3.2 billion foreign currencies through borrowings which was the catalyst of establishing Shanghai Jiushi Corporation (Chinese: 上海久事公司). According to the company, the name 久事; Jiǔshì is a wordplay on 94 (pinyin: Jiǔsì), which was the issue number of the document of the State Council regarding the use of such foreign currencies. The company was incorporated on 12 December 1987 under the Law on Industrial Enterprises Owned by the Whole People (Chinese: 全民所有制工业企业法). The Company Law of China was legislated in 1993.

Jiushi Group used the fund in Shanghai Metro, as well as other projects such as the renovation of Shanghai Hongqiao Airport.

In 2015 the company was re-incorporated as Shanghai Jiushi (Group) Co., Ltd., under the Company Law of China.

== Subsidiaries ==
As of 31 January 2018

- Shanghai Jiushi Public Transportation Group (Former Ba-shi (Group), 100%)
- Shanghai Shen-Tie Investment (99.72%)
- Shanghai Shentong Metro Group (66.57%)
  - Shanghai Shentong Metro (SSE: 600834, 58.43%)
- Qiangsheng Holding (SSE: 600662, 48.00%)
- Shanghai International Circuit (92%)
- Shanghai Transportation Investment (Group) Ltd
- Shanghai New Union Building Co., Ltd.
- Shanghai Jiushi Properties Co., Ltd.
- Shanghai Jiushi Investment Management Co., Ltd.

== Equity investments ==
As of 31 December 2015

- China Pacific Insurance Company (2.77%)
- Shanghai International Port Group (0.40%)

== See also ==
- Shanghai Construction Group, fellow city-owned enterprise
- Shanghai Municipal Investment Group, fellow city-owned enterprise
