= Shentong Metro Group =

Chinese railway operator

Shanghai Shentong Metro Group Company Limited
- Type: Subsidiary
- Industry: Rail transport; Real Estate
- Founded: April 28, 2000
- Founder: Shanghai Jiushi Group and Shanghai Municipal Investment Group
- Headquarters: 12 Hengshan Road, Shanghai, China
- Area served: Shanghai and Kunshan, Jiangsu
- Services: Metro operation services: rail traffic investment, construction, operation, maintenance services, metro security and advertising businesses
- Revenue: ▲CN¥8.8 billion (2015)
- Operating income: ▼ (CN¥11.4 billion) (2015)
- Net income: ▼ (CN¥3.6 billion) (2015)
- Total assets: ▲CN¥302.6 billion (2015)
- Total equity: ▲CN¥154.7 billion (2015)
- Owner: Shanghai State-owned Assets Supervision and Administration Commission (100%)
- Parent: Shanghai Jiushi Group (66.67%); Shanghai Municipal Investment Group (33.34%)
- Subsidiaries: Shanghai Shentong Metro Co., Ltd (58.43%)
- Website: shmetro.com
- Footnotes in a consolidated basis

Shanghai Shentong Metro Group Co., Ltd.
- Simplified Chinese: 上海申通地铁集团有限公司
- Traditional Chinese: 上海申通地鐵集團有限公司
Transcriptions
Standard Mandarin
- Hanyu Pinyin: Shànghǎi shēntōng dìtiě jítuán yǒuxiàn gōngsī

Shentong Metro Group
- Simplified Chinese: 申通地铁集团
- Traditional Chinese: 申通地鐵集團
Transcriptions
Standard Mandarin
- Hanyu Pinyin: shēntōng dìtiě jítuán

Shentong Metro
- Simplified Chinese: 申通地铁
- Traditional Chinese: 申通地鐵
Transcriptions
Standard Mandarin
- Hanyu Pinyin: shēntōng dìtiě

Shanghai Shentong Metro Group Co., Ltd. known as Shentong Metro Group is the operator of the Shanghai Metro and Shanghai Maglev, as well as the parent company of the listed company Shanghai Shentong Metro Co., Ltd. It is currently responsible for the operation of Shanghai Metro, including investment, financing and operations management, and owns most of the network's assets. The name is derived from Shen (Chinese: 申), an alternative name for Shanghai, while Tong (Chinese: 通) means transportation.

== Parent and owner ==
Shentong Metro Group is a subsidiary of Shanghai Jiushi Group (Chinese: 上海久事（集团）有限公司) (for 66.57% stake), a state-owned enterprise. (Note: Shanghai Jiushi Group is also the owner of Shanghai Public Transport Card Co., Ltd., (Chinese: 上海公共交通卡股份有限公司) which issues the Shanghai public transport card.) The minority interests (33.43% stake) was owned by another Shanghai state-owned enterprise Shanghai Municipal Investment Group (Chinese: 上海城投(集团)有限公司) (also known as Shanghai Chengtou (Group) Co., Ltd. (Chinese: 上海城投)).

Shentong Metro Group was established on 28 April 2000 with a registered capital was 26 billion yuan (Shanghai Jiushi Company invested 60%: 15.6 billion yuan; Shanghai Municipal Investment Group invested 40%: 10.4 billion yuan).

In 2001 the Shanghai Municipal People 's Government approved the "Shanghai Municipal People's Government's Approval in Principle of the Municipal Planning Commission and the Municipal Construction Commission's Opinions on Improving the "Four-Separate" System of Shanghai Rail Transit" (Hu Fu [2001] No. 13): Shentong Metro Group is the representative of the municipal government's investment in rail transit, as the municipal-level investor in the construction of Shanghai's rail transit network, undertakes the investment and financing functions of the Shanghai government in the field of rail transit. As a consequence, on 29 June 2001 Shentong Metro Group acquired Shanghai Lingqiao Tap Water Co., Ltd. (Chinese: 上海凌桥自来水股份有限公司) and renamed it on 25 July 2001 to Shanghai Shentong Metro Co., Ltd (Chinese: 上海地铁股份有限公司).

The company received huge subsidies in order to provide affordable transport in Shanghai. In 2015 the company increased the share capital from CN¥117.0 billion to CN¥164.8 billion.

== Subsidiaries ==
Since 2014, after the internal reorganization, Shentong Metro Group has the following subsidiaries:

- Shanghai Shentong Metro Co., Ltd. (Chinese: 上海地铁股份有限公司, SSE: 600834, 58.34%)
- 6 operation companies (see list below)
- 23 line asset companies (see list below)
- Shanghai Metro Maintenance Branch (Chinese: 上海地铁维护保障有限公司) with subsidiaries:
  - Rolling Stock Branch
  - Signal & Communication Branch
  - Power Supply Branch
- Shanghai Metro Operation Center Ticket Management Department (Chinese: 上海地铁运营中心票务管理部)
- Asset Investment Management Company (Chinese: 资产投资管理公司)
- Shentong Metro Construction Group (Chinese: 申通地铁建设集团)

=== Shentong Metro ===
Shanghai Shentong Metro Co., Ltd (Chinese: 上海地铁股份有限公司) known as Shentong Metro (Chinese: 申通地铁) is listed on the Shanghai Stock Exchange with stock code: SSE: 600834. Shentong Metro Group is the major shareholder with 58.43% of the shares. Shentong Metro became the first listed company in mainland China to engage in rail transit investment and operation. At present, the company consists of the headquarters and 4 subordinate subsidiaries:

- Shanghai Keolis Public Transport Operation Management Co. Ltd. (Chinese: 上海申凯公共交通运营管理有限公司) (established on 30 June 2014). A joint venture with Keolis (owning 49% of the shares).
  - Sichuan Development Shanghai Keolis Public Transport Operation Management Co., Ltd. (Chinese: 四川发展申凯公共交通运营管理有限公司), with a registered capital of 50 million yuan, Shanghai Keolis holds 51% of the shares, and Sichuan Railway Transportation (Chinese: 川发轨交) holds 49% of the shares. It will operate is the Dujiangyan MTR passenger line with expected opening November 2022.
- Shanghai Metro Financial Leasing Co., Ltd. (Chinese: 上海地铁融资租赁有限公司) (established on 30 October 2013).
- Shanghai Metro New Energy Co., Ltd. (Chinese: 上海地铁新能源有限公司) (established on 25 December 2018).
- Shanghai Shentong Jianheng Rail Transit Testing and Certification Co., Ltd. (Chinese: 上海申通鉴衡轨道交通检测认证有限公司) (established on 16 January 2019). A joint venture with Beijing Jianheng Certification Center Co., Ltd. (Chinese: 北京鉴衡认证中心有限公司) each owning 50% of the shares.

The predecessor of Shentong Metro, Shanghai Lingqiao Tap Water Co., Ltd. (Chinese: 上海凌桥自来水股份有限公司), was established on 12 June 1992. On 24 February 1994 it was listed on the Shanghai Stock Exchange. Up to 2001 the Lingqiao Tap Water Co., Ltd. was responsible for (besides water supply) rail transit construction, and there was no separate project company responsible for construction and project investment. On 29 June 2001 a major asset restructuring took place:

- Lingqiao Water Plant was sold to Shanghai Water Supply Pudong Co., Ltd. (Chinese: 上海市自来水浦东有限公司) (a wholly owned subsidiary of Shanghai Municipal Investment Group) based on the appraised value of RMB 218.0549 million;
- The 117 million yuan stake (38 million shares) in Shanghai Pudong Development Bank Co., Ltd (Chinese: 上海浦东发展银行) was sold to Shanghai Municipal Investment Group;
- The September 2000 investment and participation in 20.5 million shares (20.5%) of Shanghai Public Transport Card Co., Ltd. was terminated and the advance payment of 22.55 million yuan was recovered;
- The transfer of 40 million shares of Shanghai Dazhong Insurance Co., Ltd. (Chinese: 上海大众保险股份有限公司) was terminated and the advance payment of 51.6 million yuan was recovered;
- It returned the shares of Shanghai Jianfu Investment Co., Ltd. (Chinese: 上海建富投资有限公司) and recovered 30 million yuan of equity investment;
- The municipal government decided to transfer 63.65% of the shares of Shanghai Lingqiao Tap Water Co., Ltd. shares held by Shanghai Municipal Investment Group to Shanghai Shentong Group Co., Ltd. for the transaction price of RMB 801.7436 million.
- Shanghai Lingqiao Tap Water Co., Ltd. and Shentong Metro Group signed the "Agreement on the Transfer of Operation Rights of Metro Line 1", and Shentong Group agreed to transfer the operation rights of Line 1 (Xinzhuang to Shanghai Railway Station only) to Shanghai Lingqiao Tap Water Co., Ltd. for the period from 29 June 2001 to 28 June 2011 free of charge. This was extended to 30 June 2021.

On 25 July 2001 the operating assets such as all 18 trains of Metro Line 1, the ticket sales system and a 51% stake in Shanghai Metro Advertising Company (Chinese: 上海地铁广告有限公司, established 7 October 1992) (registered capital of 1 million yuan, mainly engaged in station light box advertisements, train advertisements, subway ticket advertisements, station broadcast advertisements) were officially renamed as Shanghai Shentong Metro Co., Ltd.

In 2013, with the establishment of the company's wholly owned subsidiary "Shanghai Shentong Metro Line 1 Development Co., Ltd." (Chinese: 上海申通地铁一号线发展有限公司), the company injected the business of Metro Line 1 into this subsidiary. At the same time, with the written consent of Shentong Metro Group, Shanghai Metro Line 1 management right was transferred to Shanghai No. 1 Metro Operation Co. Ltd. (Chinese: 上海地铁第一运营有限公司).

Shentong Metro Group was planned to inject real estate assets to the listed subsidiary Shentong Metro in 2017. However, the plan was scrapped in June 2017.

On 24 May 2019, the company completed a major asset restructuring, sold Shanghai Shentong Metro Line 1 Development Co., Ltd. (valued at 1.767 billion yuan) to Shentong Metro Group, and acquired from Shentong Metro Group the 51% of Shanghai Keolis Public Transportation Operation Management Co., Ltd. (100% valued at 104 million yuan; 51% valued at 53.04 million yuan). The transaction was completed with cash consideration.

=== Operation companies ===
The subsidiaries are responsible for the operation of different lines and different sections. All operation companies are fully subsidiaries of Shentong Metro Group, except Shanghai Keolis which is 51% owned by Shanghai Shentong Metro Co., Ltd. and the other 49% of shares are owned by Keolis.

Operation companies
Operation company	Chinese name	Metro lines	Established
Shanghai No. 1 Metro Operation Co. Ltd.	上海地铁第一运营有限公司	1 5 9 10	9 March 2009
Shanghai No. 2 Metro Operation Co. Ltd.	上海地铁第二运营有限公司	2 11 13 17	9 March 2009
Shanghai No. 3 Metro Operation Co. Ltd.	上海地铁第三运营有限公司	3 4 7 15	9 March 2009
Shanghai No. 4 Metro Operation Co. Ltd.	上海地铁第四运营有限公司	6 8 12 14	17 March 2009
Shanghai Maglev Transportation Development Co., Ltd.	上海磁浮交通发展有限公司	16 18 Maglev	August 2000
Shanghai Keolis Public Transport Operation Management Co. Ltd.	上海申凯公共交通运营管理有限公司	Pujiang T1 T2 Shanghai Pudong Airport APM and Jiaxing Tram	30 June 2014

=== Line asset companies ===
The line development company is responsible for the investment, construction, operation and management of the projects of each line, as well as the comprehensive development of the station area along the line (operating with a license for licensed operation). All companies are subsidiaries of Shentong Metro Group, except Kunshan Rail Transit Investment Development Co., Ltd. which owns the assets of the Kunshan segment (Anting - Huaqiao) of line 11 of which the parent company is Kunshan Transportation Development Holding Group Co., Ltd.

Line asset companies
Line	Line asset company	Chinese name	Remarks
1	Shentong Metro Line 1 Development Co., Ltd.	上海申通地铁一号线发展有限公司	South of Shanghai Circus World
1	Shanghai Gonghexin Road Elevated Development Co., Ltd.	上海共和新路高架发展有限公司	North of Shanghai Circus World; 87.9126% of the shares (Note: Other shares are owned by: Shanghai Jing'an District Rail Transit Construction Co., Ltd. (Chinese: 上海市静安区轨道交通建设有限公司; 8.6486%) and Shanghai Baoshan Urban and Rural Construction Investment Management Co., Ltd. (Chinese: 上海宝山城乡建设投资经营有限公司; 3.4388%).)
2	Shanghai Rail Transit Changning Line Development Co., Ltd.	上海轨道交通长宁线发展有限公司	West of Longyang Road
2	Shanghai Rail Transit Line 2 East Extension Development Co., Ltd.	上海轨道交通二号线东延伸发展有限公司	East of Longyang Road
3	Shanghai Rail Transit Pearl Line Development Co., Ltd.	上海轨道交通明珠线发展有限公司	South of Shanghai Station
3	Shanghai Rail Transit Baoshan Line Development Co., Ltd.	上海轨道交通宝山线发展有限公司	Baoshan section
4	Shanghai Rail Transit Pearl Line (Phase II) Development Co., Ltd.	上海轨道交通明珠线（二期）发展有限公司	Except shared track with line 3 segment
5	Shanghai Xinmin Rail Transit Line Development Co., Ltd.	上海莘闵轨道交通线发展有限公司	North and west of Dongchuan Road station
5	Shanghai Rail Transit Line 5 South Extension Development Co., Ltd.	上海轨道交通五号线南延伸发展有限公司	South of Dongchuan Road station
6	Shanghai Rail Transit Pudong Line Development Co., Ltd.	上海轨道交通浦东线发展有限公司
7	Shanghai Rail Transit Line 7 Development Co., Ltd.	上海轨道交通七号线发展有限公司
8	Shanghai Rail Transit Yangpu Line Development Co., Ltd.	上海轨道交通杨浦线发展有限公司
9	Shanghai Rail Transit Shensong Line Development Co., Ltd.	上海轨道交通申松线发展有限公司
10	Shanghai Rail Transit Line 10 Development Co., Ltd.	上海轨道交通十号线发展有限公司
11	Shanghai Rail Transit Shenjia Line Development Co., Ltd.	上海轨道交通申嘉线发展有限公司	Shanghai segment
11	Kunshan Rail Transit Investment Development Co., Ltd.	昆山市轨道交通投资发展有限公司	Kunshan segment (Anting - Huaqiao). Parent company is Kunshan Transportation Development Holding Group Co., Ltd.
12	Shanghai Rail Transit Line 12 Development Co., Ltd.	上海轨道交通十二号线发展有限公司
13	Shanghai Rail Transit Line 13 Development Co., Ltd.	上海轨道交通十三号线发展有限公司
14	Shanghai Rail Transit Line 14 Development Co., Ltd.	上海轨道交通十四号线发展有限公司
15	Shanghai Rail Transit Line 15 Development Co., Ltd.	上海轨道交通十五号线发展有限公司
16	Shanghai Rail Transit Line 16 Development Co., Ltd.	上海轨道交通十六号线发展有限公司
17	Shanghai Rail Transit Line 17 Development Co., Ltd.	上海轨道交通十七号线发展有限公司
18	Shanghai Rail Transit Line 18 Development Co., Ltd.	上海轨道交通十八号线发展有限公司
Pujiang	Shanghai Rail Transit Line 8 Phase III Development Co., Ltd.	上海轨道交通八号线三期发展有限公司
