= Sydney Water Head Office =

Heritage-listed building in Sydney, Australia

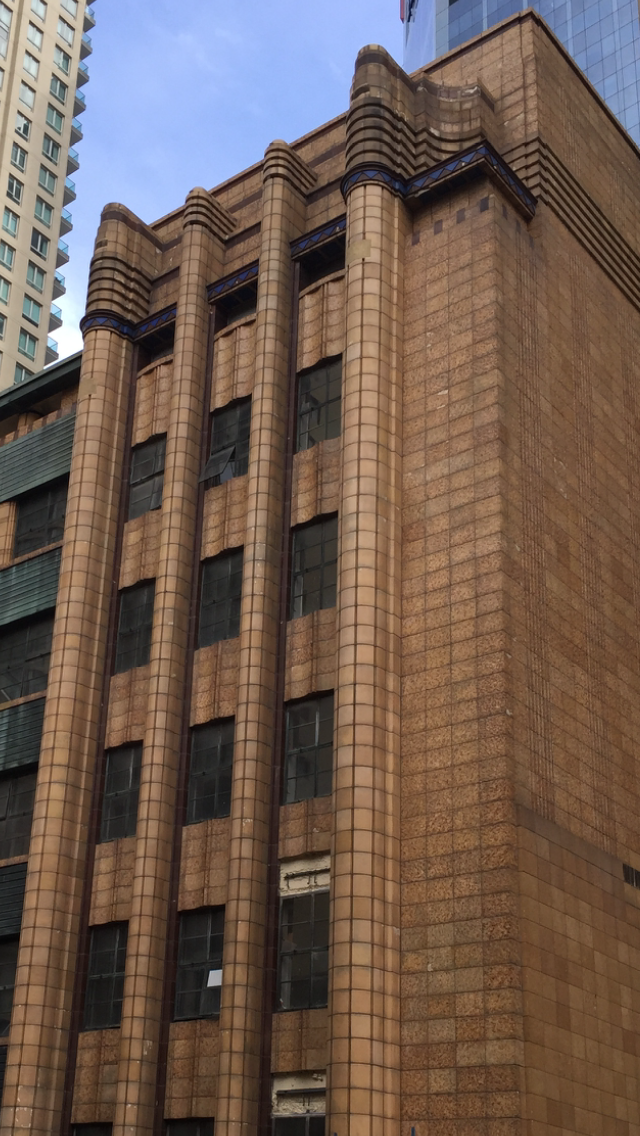
- Detail of the building facade, pictured in 2015

- Location within Sydney Location within Australia
- 33.8749°S 151.2076°E
- Location: 339–341 Pitt Street, Sydney, Australia

History
- Built: 1938–1939

Site notes
- Architect(s): Budden & Mackey
- Architectural style: Art Deco

New South Wales Heritage Register
- Official name: Sydney Water Head Office (former) (1939 building); Water Board Building; Sydney Water Head Office; the 1965 extension to the Headquarters of the Metropolitan Water; Sewerage and Drainage Board of Sydney; MWS&DB;
- Type: State heritage (built)
- Designated: 15 November 2002
- Reference no.: 1645
- Type: Office building
- Category: Government and Administration
- Builders: Howie Moffat & Co.

The Sydney Water Head Office, now known as Kimpton Margot Sydney is a heritage-listed hotel, formerly an office building, located in the Sydney central business district in New South Wales, Australia. It was designed by Henry Budden & Mackey and built from 1938 to 1939 by Howie Moffat & Co, commonly called the Water Board Building and formally the Metropolitan Water, Sewerage and Drainage Board Headquarters. Following Sydney Water's relocation to Parramatta in 2009, it was converted into a hotel (as The Primus Hotel (Chinese: 鉑瑞酒店), part of a chain of hotels owned by the municipal government of Shanghai, while the adjoining 1969 office building was redeveloped to become the Greenland Centre. In 2021, Primus Hotel Sydney closed, and in 2022 the hotel re-opened as part of the Kimpton chain operated by IHG Hotels & Resorts.

It was added to the New South Wales State Heritage Register on 15 November 2002.

== History ==
=== 19th century ===
The Metropolitan Water, Sewerage and Drainage Board's first office, occupied in April 1888, was at Circular Quay, close to the present Overseas Passenger Terminal. The building was considered to be in an inconvenient locality, and in January 1890, the Board moved to premises on the west side of Pitt Street at No. 289, near Park Street. In March 1891, a block on the corner of Pitt and Wilmott Streets, with a frontage to Pitt Street of 72-ft. and a depth of about 83-ft. was resumed and offices erected on it. These were occupied by the Board in May 1893.

=== 1939 building and 1965 extension ===
In 1911 an adjoining 87-ft. frontage in Pitt Street was bought and extensions completed in 1918. Additional land and buildings at the rear of the office were acquired in 1929 and 1936, and that part of Stewart Lane separating the Board's property was resumed, thus providing a block approximately 160-ft. square. This, together with shop premises fronting Bathurst Street, provided for comprehensive planning for present needs and future development. In 1936 it was decided to clear the site and erect a new building consisting of a basement, ground floor, mezzanine and six upper floors. This was completed on 24 December 1939, and was occupied on 2 January 1940.

The building was designed by the renowned architectural practice of Budden and Mackey who also designed both Transport Houses in Macquarie Street and in York Street, Sydney. Howie Moffat & Co. were the builders, and sculptor Stanley Hammond was responsible for the prominent bas relief over the Pitt Street entrance.

An extension along Bathurst Street was completed in 1965.

=== Sale and hotel conversion ===
In May 2009, Sydney Water vacated the building and moved to new offices in Parramatta. The Sydney Water site was sold to Shanghai-headquartered Greenland Group, who redeveloped the site as "Greenland Centre Sydney". The 1965 building was gutted and converted to residential use, with additional storeys built on top. The 1939 building was retained and converted into a hotel. The hotel, named The Primus Hotel Sydney (Chinese: 鉑瑞酒店), is part of the Primus chain of hotels owned by the municipal government of Shanghai. It is the first hotel located outside China to be operated by the Primus chain, and is also the first five-star hotel to be opened outside China by the Chinese government.

== Description ==
The building exhibits elaborate use of various coloured granite and marble finishes. Architectural terracotta tiles and bands of bronze and copper elements plus the associated bronze windows and curved fenestration to the corner make this building one of the most exquisite examples of the Art Deco style and detail in Sydney, if not Australia. Bas relief panels are strategically placed above the entrance in Pitt Street which depict the water industry and its progression of technology.

Internally, in the entrance foyer marble and travertine surfaces are located on the floors and walls, and late 20th Century suspended ceilings have been fitted. The entrance doors as a windbreak in the main entrance foyer are late 20th Century. The memorial board wall which has mosaic tiles is likely to be an infill from the 1960s.

On the ground floor, a number of original surface finishes remain behind superficial fitout including highly significant scagliola clad columns.

The building has an interior courtyard where internal offices gain light surrounded by white glazed ceramic tiles to maximise light reflection. The courtyard lower levels were infilled in the 1960s. Internally on upper levels most offices have suspended ceilings from the 20th Century although many of the internal terrazzo and travertine floor and wall surfaces survive, as does a considerable amount of original timber joinery. Office fitouts generally have changed over time.

The 1939 building is now best viewed from Pitt Street within 100 metres to the south of the building and from the intersection of Pitt and Bathurst Street and to the side lane.

Alterations include new fire door installations in the southern ground floor facade, and evidence of some louvres and air conditioning systems fitted to windows. A new fire door is noted on the eastern elevation in Pitt Street.

The 1939 building has undergone internal alterations associated with the 1966 building. Much superficial internal fitout is late 20th century.

== Heritage listing ==
The 1939 Sydney Water head office building is of State significance, reflecting the function and growth of Sydney Water and the importance the organisation has had and continues to have in the lives of many people in NSW. The building in its aesthetic, historic and scientific (technical/research) qualities is an outstanding example of architectural growth and development for its values which are reflected in its original design, materials, construction techniques, evidence of use, movable relics and siting within the City of Sydney. The building is held in high esteem by recognised community groups and authorities throughout Australia and New South Wales.

Sydney Water Head Office was listed on the New South Wales State Heritage Register on 15 November 2002 having satisfied the following criteria.

The place is important in demonstrating the course, or pattern, of cultural or natural history in New South Wales.

The Pitt Street building, completed in 1939, and the Bathurst Street extension, completed in 1965, have served as the Head Office of the Sydney Water Corporation and its predecessors up to 2009. They are respectively, the fourth and fifth offices occupied by the corporation and its predecessors. The Sydney Water Corporation was established in 1888 and initially known as the Board of Water Supply and Sewerage. The Corporation occupied part of the site (the Pitt Street building) since 1891. The corporation is one of Australia's oldest Government water and sewerage authorities, and the largest such authority in New South Wales.

The Head Office building is particularly associated with members of the corporation's predecessors such as T. H. Upton, President of the MWS&DB Board at the time of the completion of the 1939 building. Together with former board members (such as Arthur Moverly, M.L.A.), the completion, quality of finishes and successful operation of the building is a testament to the initiative and vision of these elected and appointed board members. As the fourth Head Office building for Sydney Water, the building has been the place for many decisions that have shaped Sydney's management of water, sewage and drainage infrastructure, many items which are of State and National significance. The building accommodated the corporation's technical staff which have been responsible for the design, construction and ongoing maintenance of metropolitan Sydney's water and sewerage infrastructure.

The offices and particular floors of the building are, therefore, associated with past engineers of considerable historical note for their role in major engineering works such as the construction of dams, tunnels, pumping stations etc. Albeit altered over the years to adapt to changing operational requirements, the integrity of the original and early planning and finishes of the offices are relatively intact and present a rare insight into a large office building of the era. Reflects the growth of the then Water Board and the stature of the organisation in the quality of the building. It is associated with, and one of the most significant works of the influential architects H. E. Budden and N. G. Mackey.

Through its remnant fabric, the place retains tangible evidence of the influences and conflict of Government administration of the day, given the major need in supply and management of Sydney's water, sewerage and drainage, at the time of its construction. The size of the building reflects the demand for increased staff and responsibility levels during that part of Sydney's expansion and development. The building, through its high quality design, detail, materials and finishes reflects the high regard and importance the MWS&DB; held by the community at the time, and the controversial use of funds at a time of critical uncertainty of Sydney's water supply given the drought of the late 1930s.

The site was developed from 1891 through to c. 1965 to provide successive places of accommodation for State Government offices. The continuing use of the buildings by a government authority demonstrates the practice of centralising head offices in purpose built accommodation within the Sydney central business district. The longevity of uninterrupted operations (over 110 years) by the Sydney Water Corporation and its predecessors at the Pitt Street site is now unique in New South Wales in regard to a large Government authority. The Pitt Street office completed in 1939 is the last major government office building to have been completed before the outbreak of World War II which then marked a major shift in architectural expression.

The place is important in demonstrating aesthetic characteristics and/or a high degree of creative or technical achievement in New South Wales.

The building represents state of the art office design and detailing at the time of its construction. It has a relatively high state of integrity, the building's fabric continuing to provide an excellent example for the study of the development of modern Australian architecture. It is arguably one of the best known examples of institutional buildings in the City of Sydney, particularly in regard to its former extensive public areas providing a place for inquiry relating to domestic, commercial and industrial rating and building construction activities. Possibly the most elaborate, high quality and well detailed Institutional Art Deco building in Sydney, probably NSW. Associated with, and designed by the influential architects Budden and Mackey. Reflects the growth of the then Water Board and the stature of the organisation in the quality of the building. In its original design, detail and materials, the building is arguably the most elaborate, high quality example of Institutional Inter-War Functionalist/Art Deco building in Sydney, and probably across New South Wales. Through its use and extent of scagliola, marble, travertine, terrazzo and terracotta and ceramic tiles the building contains construction elements and finishes which collectively are unlikely to be built again to such an extent. The building is a high quality contribution to the architectural townscape of Sydney which has become increasingly rare since its construction. The use of architectural terracotta tiles on this building, whilst not rare in the Sydney area, are arguably of the highest quality detailing in Sydney, if not NSW. The building retains three bronze low relief architectural panels designed by Stanley James Hammond, a major Victorian architectural sculptor whose professional career spanned the Inter-War eras.

The place has a strong or special association with a particular community or cultural group in New South Wales for social, cultural or spiritual reasons.

The building is recognised by the Heritage Council of NSW as significant to New South Wales in relation to its historical, scientific, cultural, social, archaeological, natural and aesthetic values. As Head Office for Sydney Water, the building has been associated with the working lives of many Sydneysiders. It is likely many of these associations will be of value to those people, particularly the former propensity for long workplace associations with the organisation. Given the strong sense of identity of former and present employees and management with the corporation and its predecessors, the building is likely to be held in some regard by these members of the community. The 1939 building has been recognised by a number of organisations for its high design values and will likely be highly valued by non-statutory organisations such as the National Trust of Australia (NSW), The Royal Australian Institute of Architects (NSW Chapter), and the Art Deco Society and other interest groups for the outstanding design and detail qualities, the likes of which are not likely to be built again. The building is recognised on the Register of the National Estate as a place which is a component of the cultural environment of Australia, that has aesthetic, historic, scientific and social significance for future generations, as well as for the present community.

The place has potential to yield information that will contribute to an understanding of the cultural or natural history of New South Wales.

The building exhibits high quality use and details of materials which are now increasingly rare. Such elements and details include: the use of scagliola on ground floor columns and internal common wall surfaces, bronze and copper facade elements, architectural terracotta, bas relief panels amongst others. Beyond the late 20th century fitouts, it is likely the building will exhibit spaces and planning, the likes of which have become increasingly rare with institutional buildings constructed at that time.

The place possesses uncommon, rare or endangered aspects of the cultural or natural history of New South Wales.

In terms of their collective high quality and innovation and as the headquarters of Sydney Water Corporation, both the 1939 and the 1966 buildings are unique.

The place is important in demonstrating the principal characteristics of a class of cultural or natural places/environments in New South Wales.

Elements of the building are representative in their construction and use of materials with other comparable commercial buildings at or after the period of its construction.

== See also ==
- Australian non-residential architectural styles
- Sydney Water
