= Spire London =

Construction Project

- Artist's impression
- Interactive map of the Spire London area

General information
- Status: site preparation stage, overall project stalled
- Type: Residential
- Location: London, E14; United Kingdom, 2 Hertsmere Road
- Coordinates: 51.5072071°N 0.025029°W
- Opening: 2021
- Owner: Greenland Group

Height
- Roof: 235.1 m (771 ft)

Technical details
- Structural system: Concrete frame and core wall system
- Floor count: 67

Design and construction
- Architecture firm: HOK
- Structural engineer: Robert Bird Group

Website
- www.greenlanduk.com/uk-projects/spire-london/

Spire London, previously known as Hertsmere House, is a construction project located in West India Quay, near Canary Wharf. Developed by Greenland Group and designed by HOK, construction on the tallest building of 67 stories commenced in 2016, and (at that time) was targeted for completion in 2021.

Upon completion, Spire London is due to become western Europe's tallest residential tower. In total, the development is planned to have 861 apartments and expected to cost £800m to construct.

As of mid-2019, works on the project were halted.

== History ==
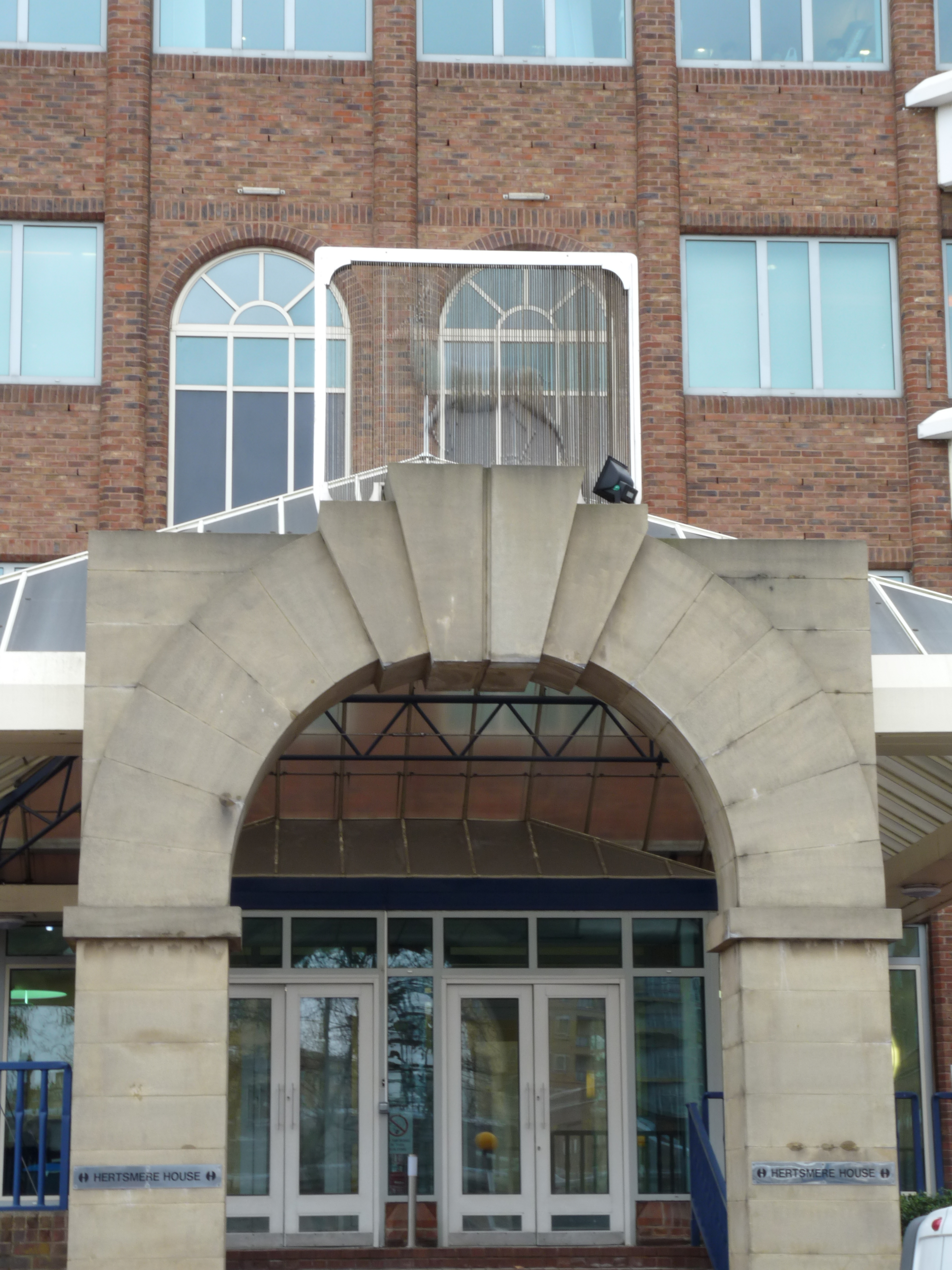
The entrance to Hertsmere House, which was demolished to make way for Spire London

Spire London is the third skyscraper proposed for the site previously occupied by Hertsmere House, an office building which was demolished to make way for the new development. The first proposal was Columbus Tower, a 237 m (778 ft) residential building. This was followed by Hertsmere House, a residential tower of 75 storeys and named after the building it was set to replace.

In September 2014, Greenland Group acquired the site from Commercial Estates Group (CEG) and submitted a planning application for a new skyscraper which, at the time, was still known as Hertsmere House, before a name change to Spire London. The application was approved by councillors at Tower Hamlets Council on 8 February 2016, with five councillors voting in support of the plans and three voting against.

As part of the scheme, it was proposed that developer Greenland Group would contribute the equivalent of £50m to the local community.

Though there were few objections to the design of the building, objections were raised about its location. The plans were opposed by Canary Wharf Group, Credit Suisse (whose offices it is planned to be located next to) and the Museum of London Docklands as well as some local residents who raised concerns regarding the density of the scheme and overshadowing in the local area. Concerns were also raised that the tower will be located next to a Grade I listed Georgian warehouse.

== Design ==
The design of the building includes prow and bow shapes, taking inspiration from the maritime history of the docks where it is due to be built. It is also based on the petals of the orchid.

== Construction ==
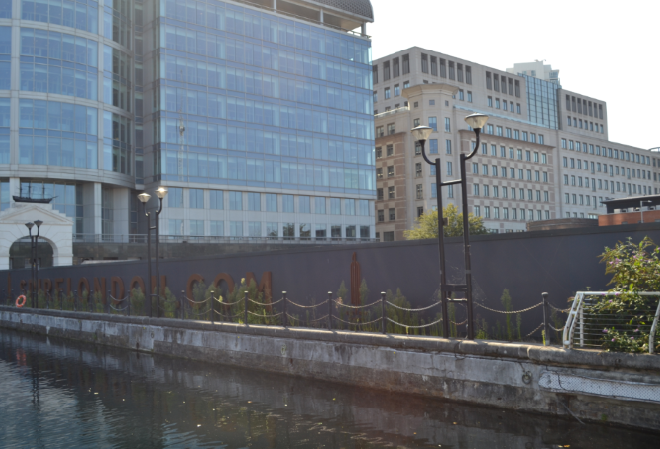
Spire London Site, September 2020

Demolition of the office building previously on the site known as Hertsmere House began on 6 July 2016, with piling starting in January 2017. By the summer of 2018, building work was due to have reached the halfway point, with the entire development expected to be complete in 2020.

As of July 2017, piling work was ongoing and expected to be finished in November 2017. Basement work and main build were scheduled to begin by the end of 2017. In May 2017, it was announced by the developer Greenland Group, that engineering firm AECOM / Tishman Realty & Construction would be the construction partner for the scheme. At that time it was reported that the development was on course to be complete in late 2020.

Following the Grenfell Tower fire and the independent review of building regulations and fire safety, work stopped on the Spire in May 2018 while the developer looked at an additional stairwell for the upper floors, where only one had been planned for before. However an article in a predated property newspaper indicates that a rethink may be in play due to the property downturn as a result of Brexit uncertainty and other economic factors.

In January 2022, Greenland Group stated in a report to Tower Hamlets Council that the tower is "undeliverable in current market conditions", presents a "very significant commercial risk", and would only provide a return of £8.8 million. As a result, Greenland proposed removing all 96 affordable flats from the Spire, which would restore the project's financial viability by improving its return to over £50 million.

As of 2023, construction work is still on hold, with the hoarded site remaining fenced off and empty.

As June 2025, Greenland Group are considering selling the site for £600 million.

== See also ==
- List of tallest buildings and structures in London
- List of tallest buildings and structures in the United Kingdom
