= Greenland Centre, Sydney =

Residential skyscraper in Sydney, New South Wales, Australia

Greenland Centre
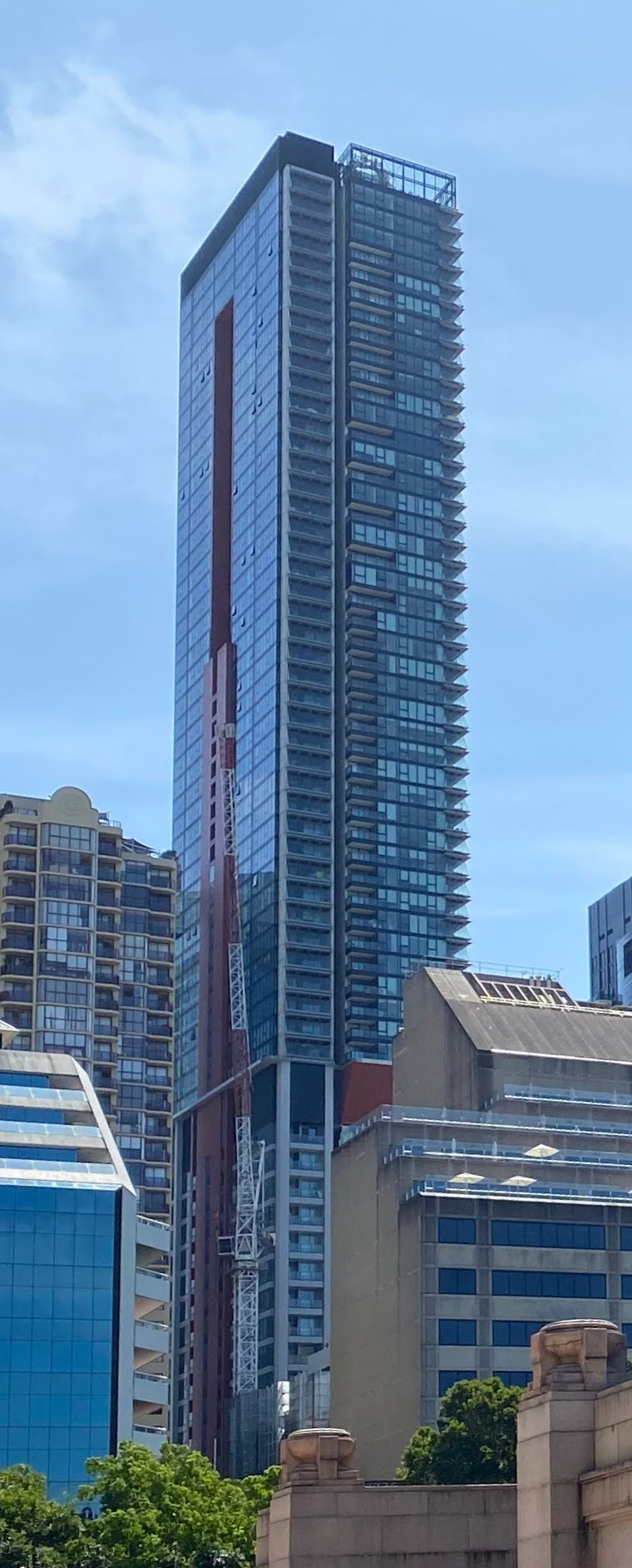
- Greenland Centre in February 2023
- Interactive map of the Greenland Centre area

General information
- Status: Completed
- Type: Residential
- Location: Sydney, New South Wales, Australia
- Coordinates: 33.873916°S 151.208871°E
- Construction started: 2017
- Completed: 2021
- Cost: A$700 million

Height
- Height: 236.7 metres (777 ft)

Technical details
- Floor count: 68

Design and construction
- Architecture firm: BVN, Woods Bagot
- Developer: Greenland
- Structural engineer: Arup Group & Robert Bird Group
- Services engineer: Wood & Grieve Engineers
- Main contractor: Brookfield Multiplex; Probuild

Website
- https://www.greenlandcentre.com.au/

The Greenland Centre is a 68-storey residential skyscraper in Sydney, New South Wales, Australia, located on the corner of Bathurst and Pitt Street. At a height of 237 m (778 ft), it is the seventh-tallest building in Sydney as of 2024.

== Construction ==
The project was developed by Greenland Group and was designed by BVN and Woods Bagot. The initial stages of the project involved the gutting and conversion of the Sydney Water Board tower which previously occupied the site, before progressing to the construction of further storeys on top, resulting in a residential tower with 470 apartments and six penthouses across 67 levels. The adjoining heritage-listed, Art Deco style former Metropolitan Water Sewerage and Drainage Board building was converted into the Primus Hotel, a boutique 180-bed, five-star hotel as part of the same project. The Primus Hotel is part of a hotel chain owned by the municipal government of Shanghai.

Demolition on the site began in early 2015, and construction on the main tower began in 2017. Initially, the hotel was expected to open in 2016 and the residential tower in 2019. However due to significant delays in construction, the opening of the tower was delayed to 2021. The tower topped out in July 2020, and was completed in March 2021.

Any reference to the number four is avoided in the building because "four" and "death" have a similar pronunciation in Mandarin Chinese. Consequently, the tower will have a floor numbered 83, but there will only be 68 physical storeys, with no floors numbered 4, 14, 24, 34, 40–49, 54, 64 or 74.

=== Gallery ===
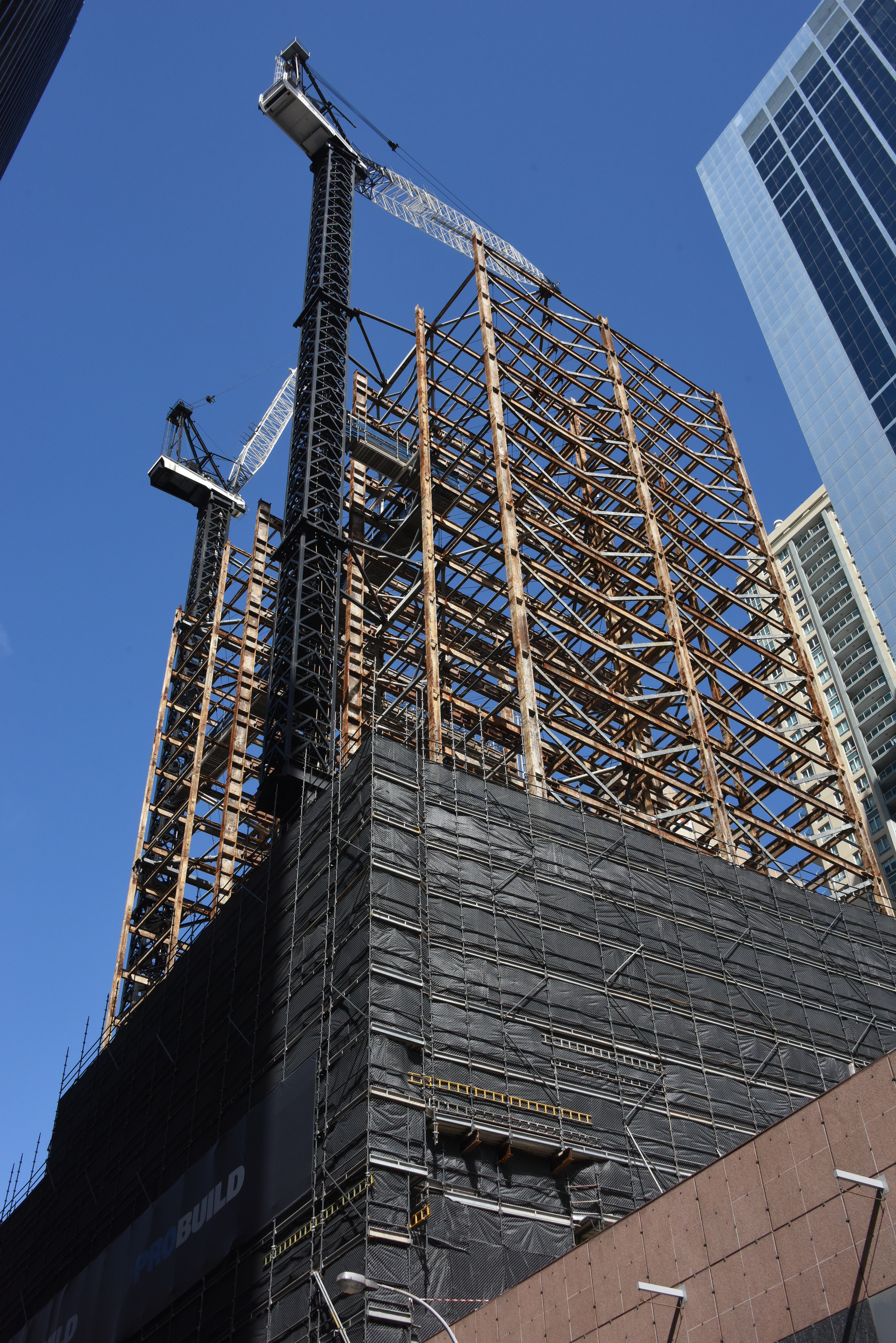
The previous Sydney Water Board building was gutted and stripped, retaining the internal frame which was reused as part of the structure for the lower section of Greenland Centre. Pictured in March 2018

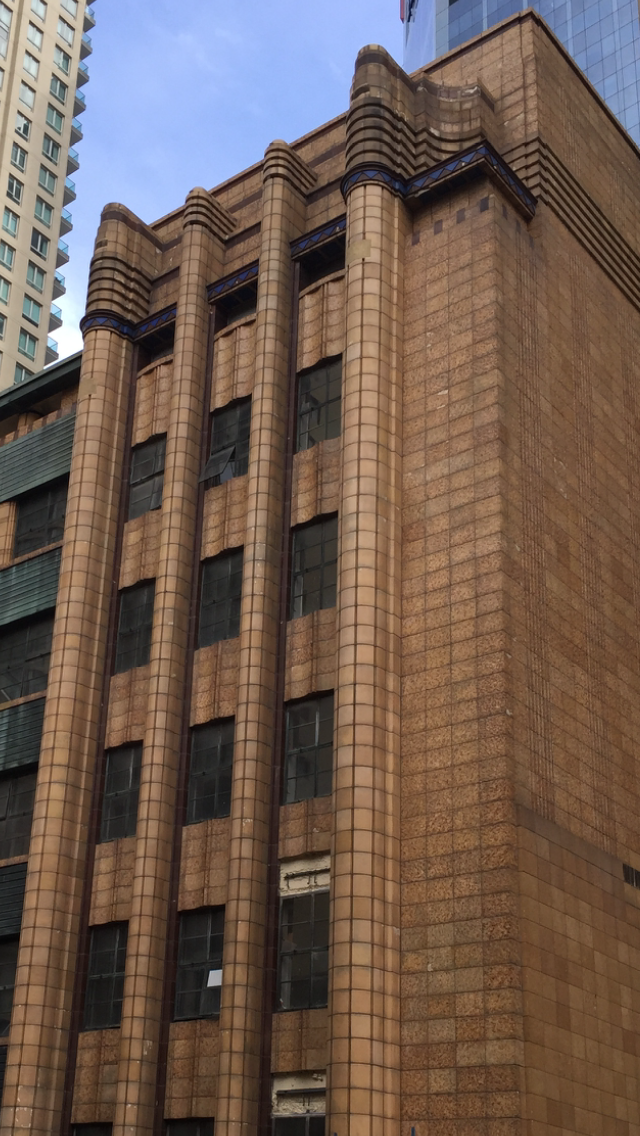
The former art-deco Metropolitan Water Sewerage & Drainage Board building was developed into the Primus Hotel as part of the development.

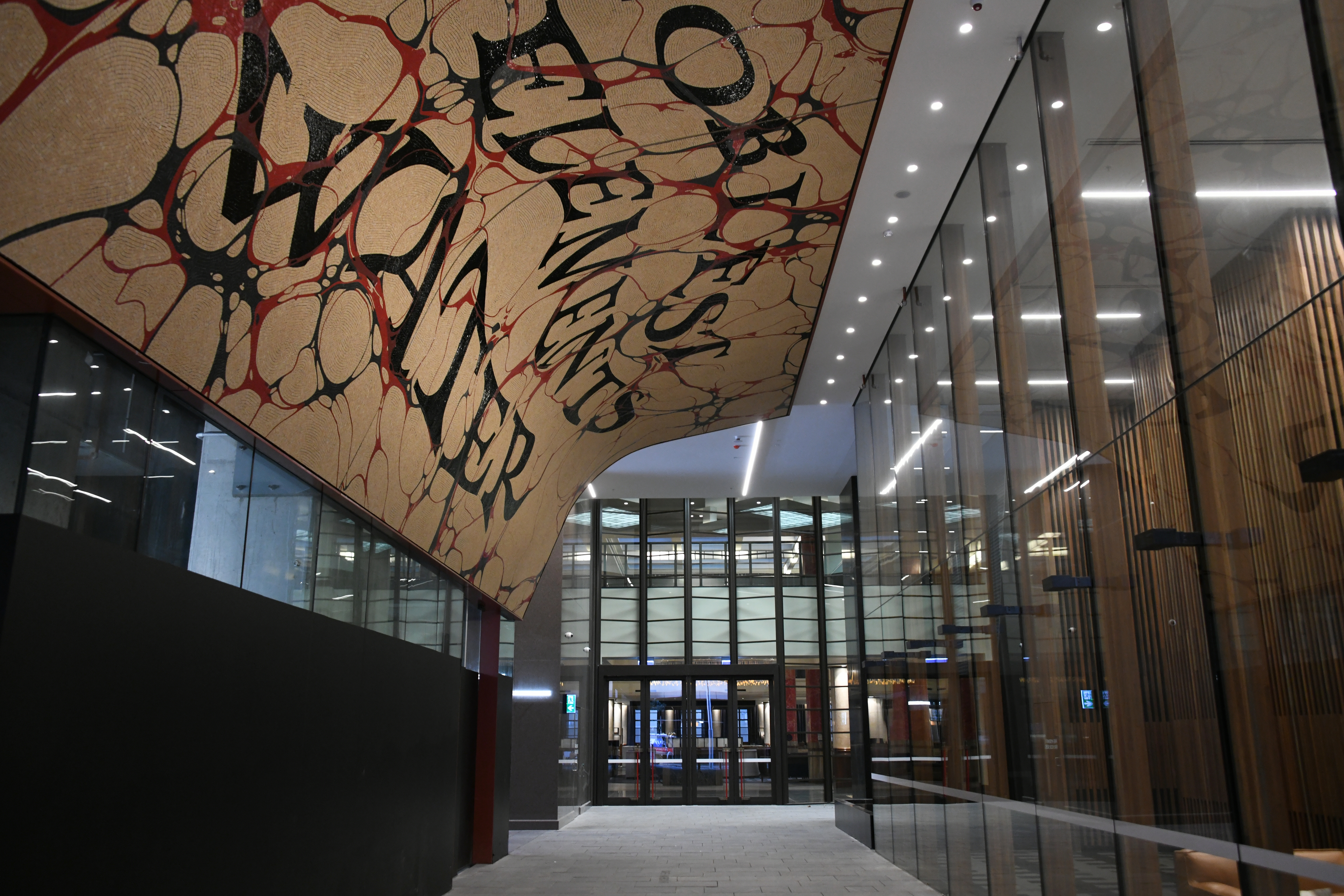
Lobby
