= Greenland Holdings =

Chinese real estate developer

- Trade name: Greenland Group
- Company type: public
- Traded as: SSE: 600606; SSE 50 Component
- Industry: real estate, property development, construction, property investment, real estate financing
- Founded: 1992
- Headquarters: Shanghai, China
- Area served: Mainland China
- Key people: Zhang Yuliang (Chairman & President)
- Products: apartments, infrastructure, real estate property, financial loans
- Revenue: ▲CN¥247.400 billion (2016)
- Operating income: ▲CN¥15.329 billion (2016)
- Net income: ▲CN¥7.207 billion (2016)
- Total assets: ▲CN¥733.138 billion (2016)
- Total equity: ▲CN¥56.271 billion (2016)
Owner
Shanghai Government	(46.37%)
employees	(28.99%)
Ping An Trust	(6.61%)
others	(18.02%)
- Footnotes / references in consolidated financial statement

Greenland Holdings Corp., Ltd.
- Simplified Chinese: 绿地控股集团股份有限公司
- Literal meaning: Greenland Holdings Group, Company Limited by Shares
Transcriptions

Greenland Group
- Simplified Chinese: 绿地集团
Transcriptions

Greenland Holdings
- Simplified Chinese: 绿地控股
Transcriptions

Greenland Holdings Corp., Ltd. known as Greenland Group is a Chinese real estate developer. It was founded as a state-owned enterprise. As of 31 December 2016, the top 10 shareholders of the listed company owned a combined 88% shares, with some state-owned enterprises having invested in Greenland via private equity funds.

As of 2014, it owned about US$58 billion in assets. By the company's own estimate, in 2014 it was the largest real estate developer in the world by floor space under construction and sales revenue.

== History ==
Greenland Holdings was created in 1992 to develop green belts around Shanghai. Starting around 2013, it began to make major investments in developments outside of China. As of 2014, these include Metropolis Los Angeles in Los Angeles, Spire London, a 235-metre residential skyscraper in the London Docklands, Greenland Centre Sydney in Sydney, Atlantic Yards in New York, and an 872 unit condo plus 122 room hotel complex in Toronto.

In 2014 the company took over Shanghai Jinfeng Investment (Chinese: 上海金丰投资) as part of a backdoor listing. Since June 2017, it has been part of Shanghai Stock Exchange's blue chip index: SSE 50 Index.

In July 2023, the company defaulted on a $432 million dollar bond.

== Non-real estate interests ==
Greenland Group are the current majority shareholder of the Chinese Super League club Shanghai Shenhua F.C., having officially taken over the operation of the club after purchasing the 28.5% share owned by previous majority shareholder Zhu Jun in January 2014.

== Shareholders and board of directors ==
Despite 46.37% of the company being owned by the Shanghai Government, some members of the board, current, and former employees also own 28.99% of shares as the second largest shareholder. Both Greenland Holdings and the employee-owned private equity fund are represented by Zhang Yuliang (Chinese: 张玉良) as the legal representative.

The 15-person board of directors consists of 5 independent directors, as well as Zhang Yuliang, Tan Jiancheng, vice-chairman of Greenland Holdings and vice-president of Shanghai Municipal Investment Group), Cai Shunming, vice-chairman of Greenland Holdings and vice-president of Shanghai Land Group), Xu Jing, executive vice-president), Zhang Yun, executive vice-president), Tian Bo, ex-vice president of Greenland Holdings), Ji Guanglin, Greenland Holdings director and chairman of associate company Shanghai SMI Holding, a subsidiary of Shanghai Municipal Investment Group), He Qiju (Chinese: 何启菊, Greenland Holdings director and a manager of Shanghai Land Group), Zhou Qing (Chinese: 周青, Greenland Holdings director and deputy general manager of associate company Shanghai Star Group, a subsidiary of Shanghai Land Group) and Song Chengli, Greenland Holdings director and vice-chairman of Ping An Trust). To sum up, out of 10 non-independent directors, the Shanghai Government has 5 seats, while Ping An Trust has one seat.

As of 31 December 2016

- Shanghai Municipal People's Government's State-owned Assets Supervision and Administration Commission
  - Shanghai Land Group (25.82%)
  - Shanghai Municipal Investment Group (20.55%)
- Management board and employee of Greenland Holdings via a private equity fund (Chinese: 上海格林兰投资企业(有限合伙), 28.99%)
- Shenzhen Ping'an Innovation Capital Investment (Chinese: 深圳市平安创新资本投资有限公司), a subsidiary of Ping An Trust of Ping An Group (6.61%)
- Shanghai Tianchen (2.29%)
- Chinese: 上海鼎晖嘉熙股权投资合伙企业(有限合伙), a private equity fund that CDH Investments acted as GP (1.80%)
- Chinese: 上海国投协力发展股权投资基金合伙企业(有限合伙), a private equity fund that SDIC acted as GP (0.91%)
- Chinese: 中国工商银行股份有限公司－中证上海国企交易型开放式指数证券投资基金), an index tracking fund that ICBC acted as GP (0.34%)
- Chinese: 珠海普罗股权投资基金(有限合伙), a private equity fund from Zhuhai (0.33%)
