= Chunshen Road station =

Shanghai Metro station

Chunshen Road 春申路
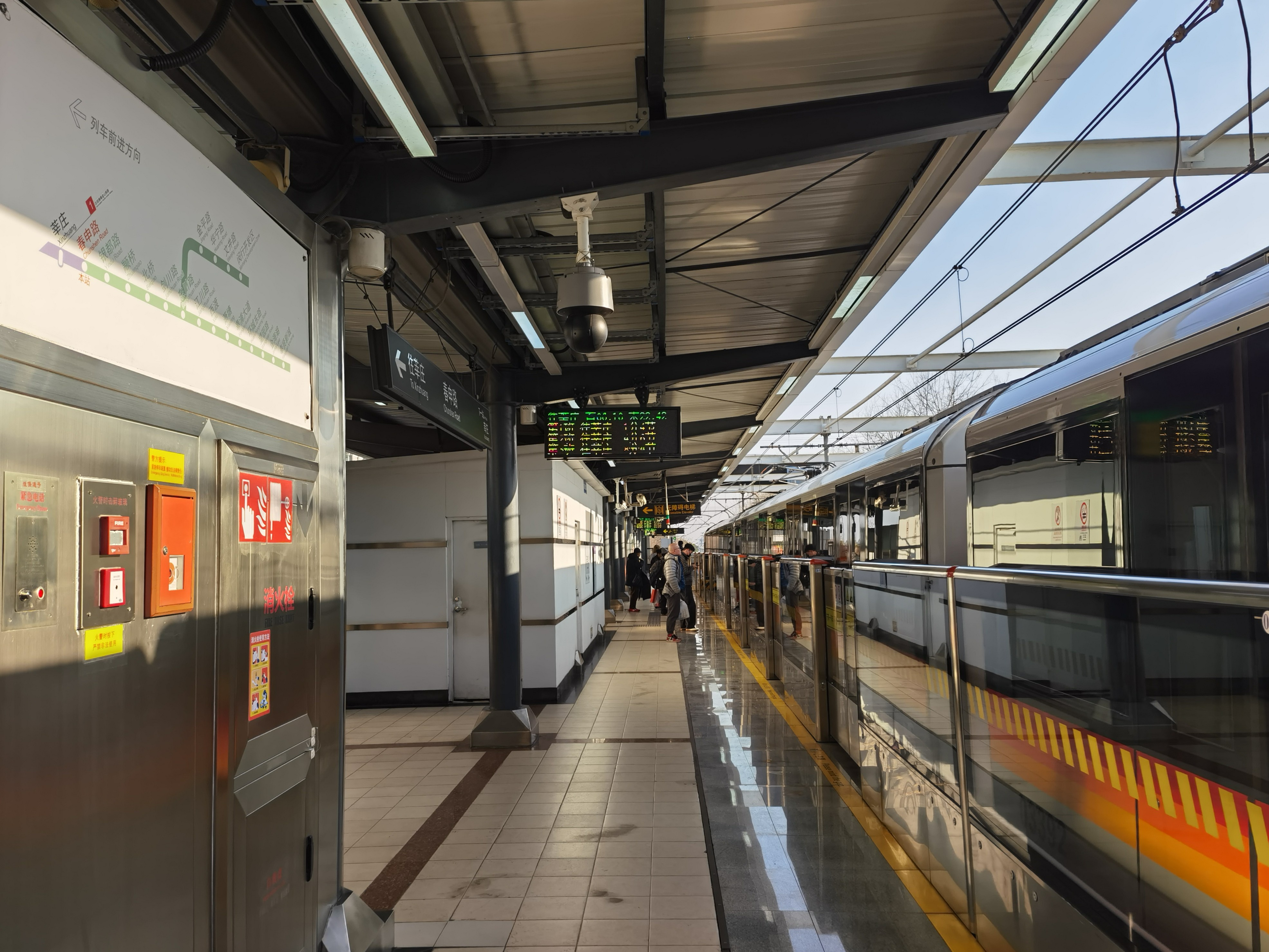
- Station platform, Xinzhuang-bound side

Chinese name
- Chinese: 春申路
Transcriptions
Standard Mandarin
- Hanyu Pinyin: Chūnshēn Lù
Wu
- Romanization: tshen sen lu
Yue: Cantonese
- Jyutping: ceon1 san1 lou6

General information
- Location: Humin Highway and Chunshen Road; Minhang District, Shanghai; China
- Coordinates: 31.1°N 121.381°E
- Operator: Shanghai No. 1 Metro Operation Co., Ltd.
- Line: Line 5
- Platforms: 2 (2 side platforms)
- Tracks: 2

Construction
- Structure type: Elevated
- Accessible: Yes

History
- Opened: 25 November 2003

Services
| Preceding station | Shanghai Metro | Following station |
|---|---|---|
| Xinzhuang Terminus | Line 5 | Yindu Road towards Fengxian Xincheng or Minhang Development Zone |
Location
- Location within Shanghai

Chunshen Road (Chinese: 春申路; pinyin: Chūnshēn Lù) is an above-ground station on Line 5 of the Shanghai Metro. Located at the intersection of Humin Highway and Chunshen Road in the city's Minhang District, the station opened with the rest of the first phase of Line 5 on 25 November 2003. It is currently served by six-car trains running on the mainline of Line 5 between Xinzhuang and Fengxian Xincheng stations. Between 28 December 2018 and 26 December 2020, passengers who wish to travel to stations on the branch line of Line 5 between Dongchuan Road and Minhang Development Zone stations must transfer to four-car trains at Dongchuan Road station. Since 26 December 2020, both the main and the branch line trains run all the way to Xinzhuang with no shuttle service.

== History ==
The station opened for passenger operations on 25 November 2003, concurrent with the opening of the initial segment of Line 5 between Xinzhuang and Minhang Development Zone.

Until 2018, the station platforms could accommodate only four-car trains. In 2016, in anticipation of the extension of Line 5 to Fengxian Xincheng, construction began to extend the platforms to accommodate six-car trains. This work was completed by May 2018.

== Description ==
Chunshen Road is an above-ground metro station located at the intersection of Humin Highway and Chunshen Road, in the Minhang District of Shanghai.

All trains which serve this station currently terminate at Xinzhuang to the north and Dongchuan Road to the south. This service pattern was implemented on 20 October 2018 in anticipation of the opening of the Line 5 extension to Fengxian Xincheng. This is because six-car trains are being run on the portion between Xinzhuang and Dongchuan Road, while four-car trains are run on the section between Dongchuan Road and Minhang Development Zone, which cannot accommodate longer trains. Passengers wishing to continue their journey on Line 5 to Minhang Development Zone must transfer at Dongchuan Road.

Previously, prior to the opening of the Line 5 extension, and with service provided by four-car trains, trains which served this station would stop at all destinations on Line 5. From 20 August 2018 to 19 October 2018, trains which served this station alternated their southern terminus as either Jinping Road or Minhang Development Zone, with all trains serving the northern terminus of Xinzhuang.

Once the extension of Line 5 opens, all trains which stop at Chunshen Road station will be six-car trains that serve the main line between Xinzhuang and Fengxian Xincheng. Passengers wishing to access stations on the branch line of Line 5 must transfer at Dongchuan Road. In the second half of 2019, both four-car and six-car trains will run together in the combined segment between Xinzhuang and Dongchuan Road, thus re-allowing passengers to travel to all destinations on Line 5 from Chunshen Road without transferring vehicles.

The station is fully accessible. Within the fare-paid zone, there are two elevators which connect the ground level with each of the two platforms.

This station should not be confused with Chunshen railway station, a station on the Jinshan railway and located about 4.7 kilometres (2.9 mi) to the southwest by car.

=== Exits ===
There is one station exit:

- Exit 1: Humin Highway
