= Huaning Road station =

Shanghai Metro station

Huaning Road 华宁路
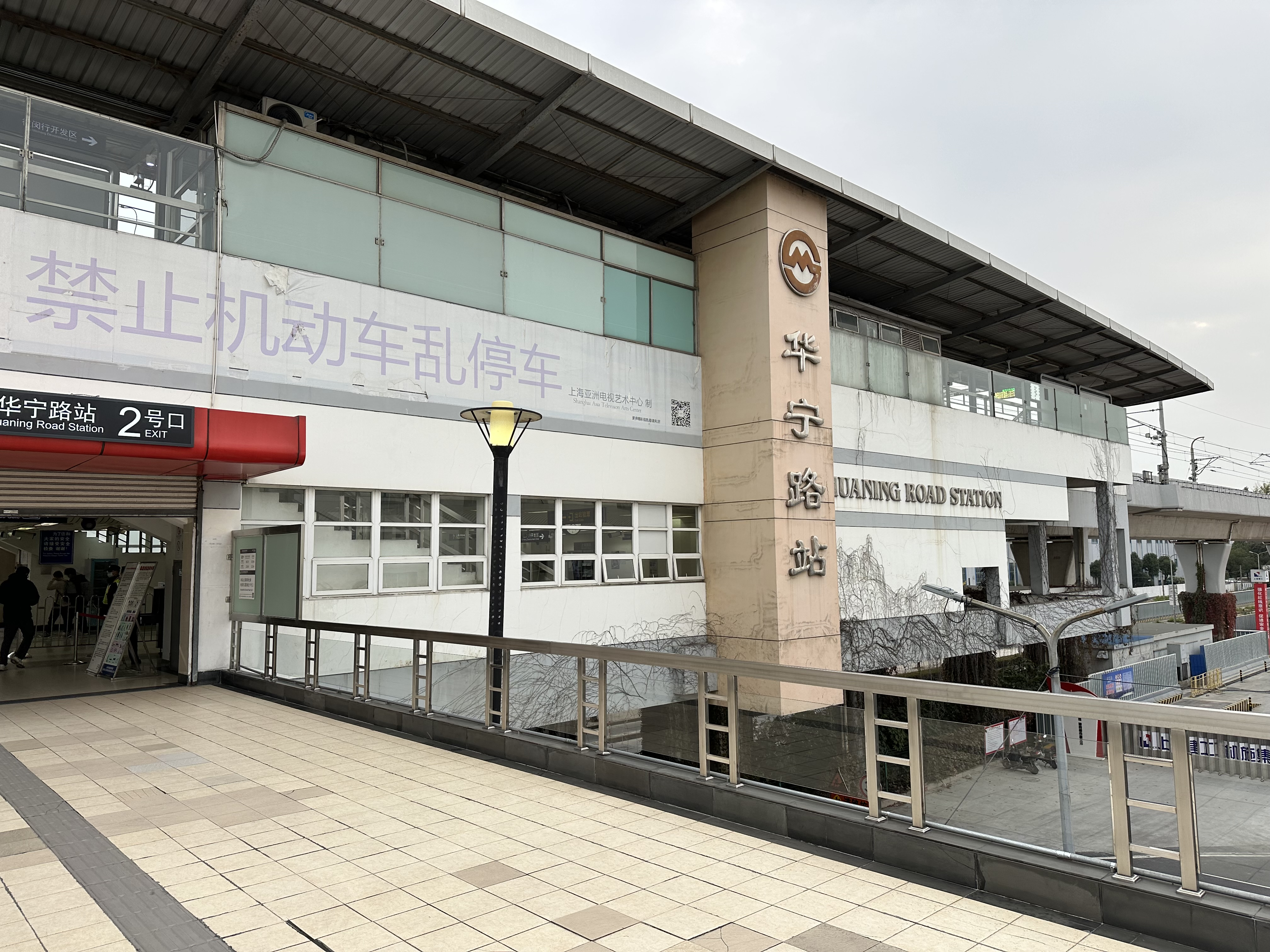
- Huaning Road station in November 2023

General information
- Location: Dongchuan Road and Huaning Road (华宁路); Minhang District, Shanghai; China
- Coordinates: 31.0092°N 121.39°E
- Operator: Shanghai No. 1 Metro Operation Co. Ltd.
- Line: Line 5
- Platforms: 2 (2 side platforms)
- Tracks: 2

Construction
- Structure type: Elevated
- Accessible: Yes

History
- Opened: 25 November 2003
- Closed: 2027 (estimated)

Services
Preceding station	Shanghai Metro	Following station
Jinping Road towards Xinzhuang	Line 5 branch	Wenjing Road towards Minhang Development Zone
Location
- Location within Shanghai

Huaning Road (simplified Chinese: 华宁路; traditional Chinese: 華寧路; pinyin: Huáníng Lù) is a station on Line 5 of the Shanghai Metro. It is situated on the branch service of the line, between Dongchuan Road and Minhang Development Zone. Passengers can transfer to the main line at Dongchuan Road. However, since 26 December 2020, this is not the case, as trains have resumed service all the way to Xinzhuang.
