= Xiaotang =

Xiaotang may refer to any of the following:

- Xiaotang station, a station on Line 5 of the Shanghai Metro
- Xiaotang Mountain Han Shrine, a funerary stone shrine in Shandong Province, China

Xiaotang is also a transliteration of multiple Chinese given names. Notable people with the name Xiaotang include:

- Wan Xiaotang (1916– 1966), a Chinese politician
- Wang Xiaotang (born 1934), a Chinese film actress, director and screenplay writer
- Li Xiao (writer) (born Li Xiaotang, 1950), a Chinese writer
