= Jiangchuan Road station =

Metro station in Shanghai, China

Jiangchuan Road 江川路
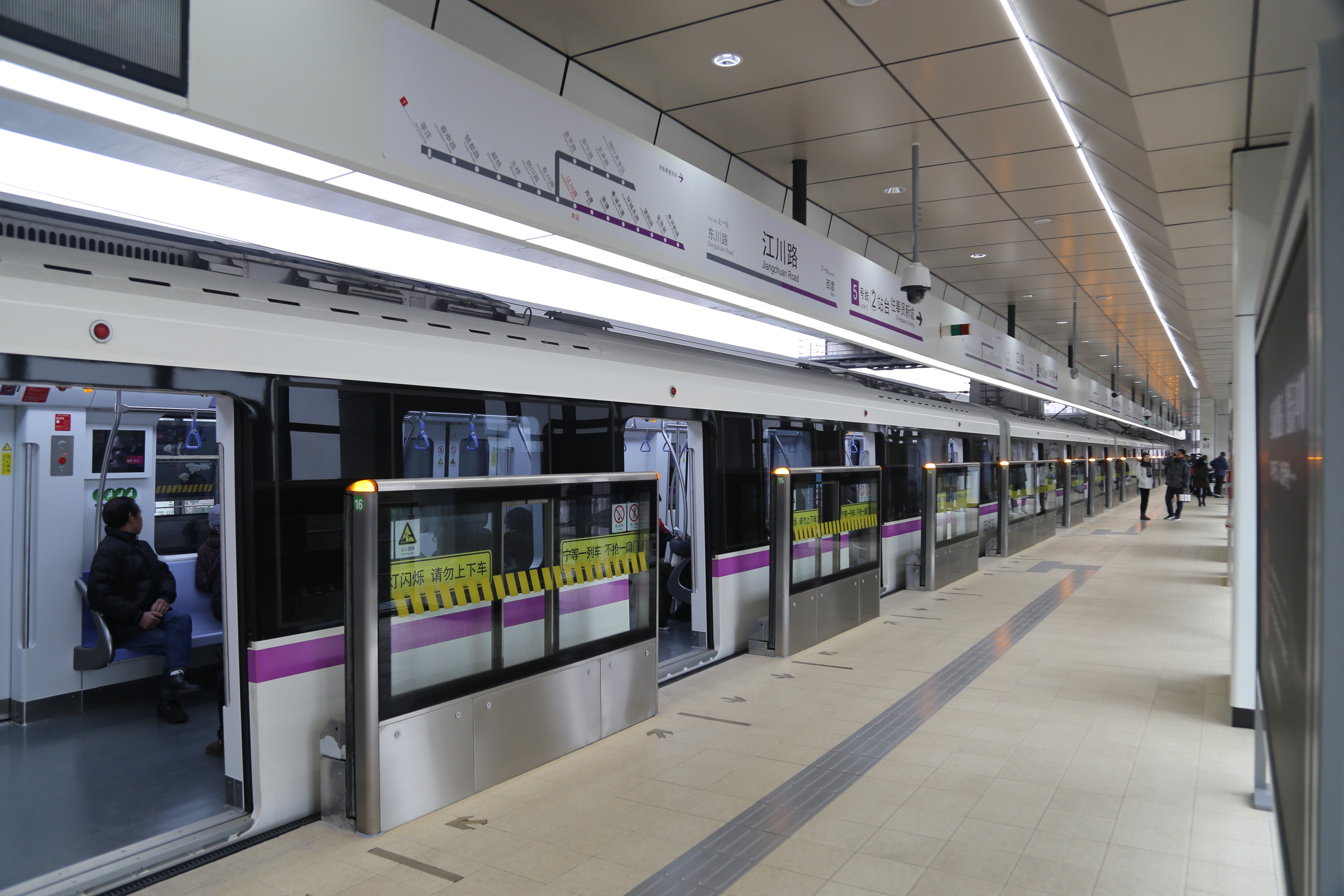
- Station platform with Fengxian Xincheng-bound train

General information
- Location: Jiangchuan Road and Humin Road, Minhang District, Shanghai; China
- Coordinates: 31.007285°N 121.418883°E
- Operated by: Shanghai No. 1 Metro Operation Co. Ltd.
- Line: Line 5
- Platforms: 2 (2 side platforms)
- Tracks: 2

Construction
- Structure type: Elevated
- Accessible: Yes

History
- Opened: 30 December 2018

Services
Preceding station	Shanghai Metro	Following station
Dongchuan Road towards Xinzhuang	Line 5	Xidu towards Fengxian Xincheng
Location

Jiangchuan Road (Chinese: 江川路; pinyin: Jiāngchuān Lù) is a station on Line 5 of the Shanghai Metro. Located at Jiangchuan Road and Humin Road in the city's Minhang District, the station is located on the main branch of Line 5 and opened as part of the southern extension of Line 5 on 30 December 2018. It is an elevated station.

The station is located between Dongchuan Road and Xidu. Between Dongchuan Road and Jiangchuan Road stations, the branch line of Line 5, which branches off to the west toward Minhang Development Zone, connects with the main line. South of this station, Line 5 trains travel on the lower deck of the Minpu Second Bridge over the Huangpu River.
