= Jinping Road station =

Shanghai Metro station

Jinping Road 金平路
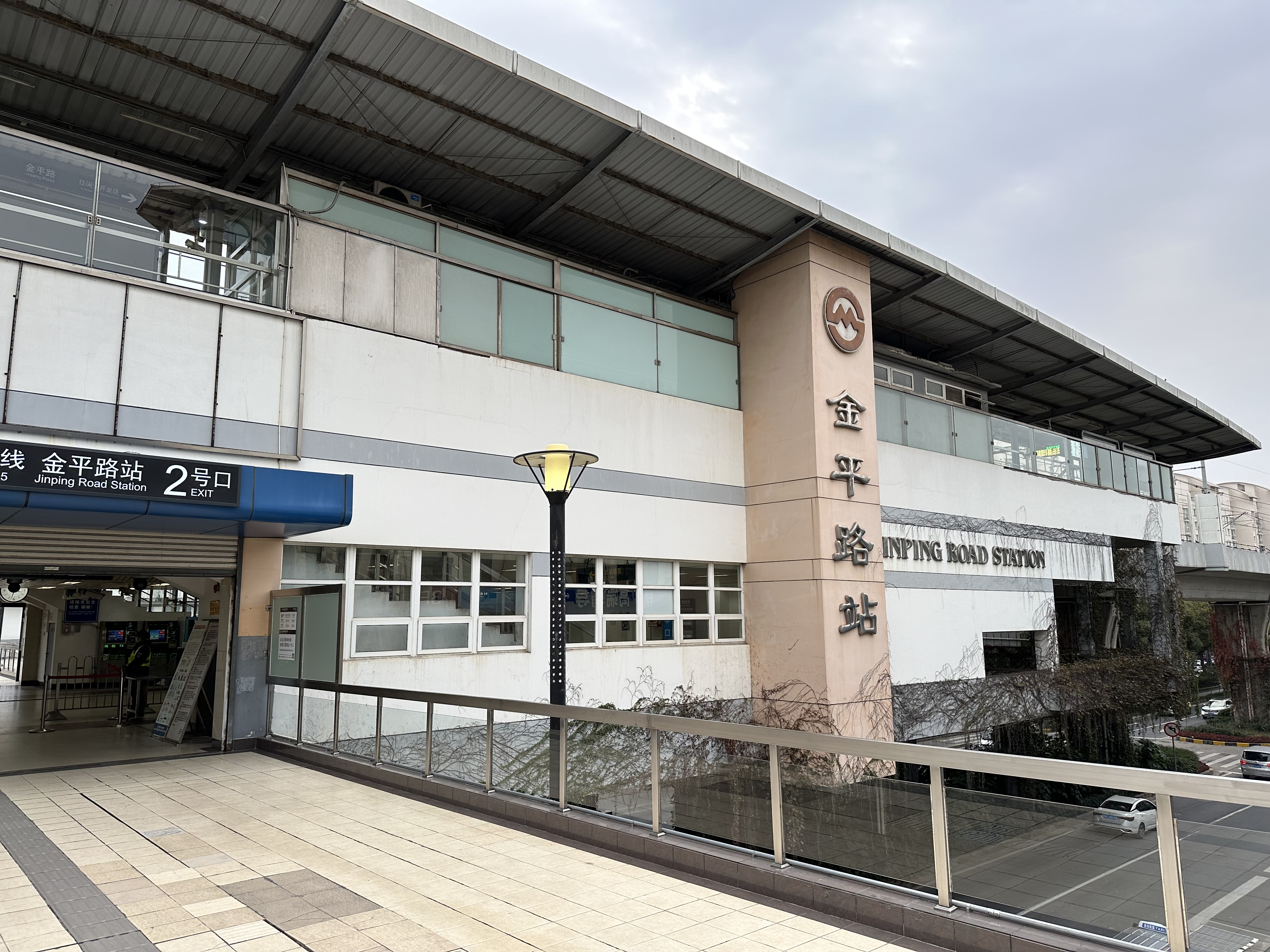
- Station exterior

General information
- Location: Dongchuan Road and Jinping Road (金平路); Minhang District, Shanghai; China
- Coordinates: 31.0131°N 121.405°E
- Operator: Shanghai No. 1 Metro Operation Co. Ltd.
- Line: Line 5
- Platforms: 2 (2 side platforms)
- Tracks: 2

Construction
- Structure type: Elevated
- Accessible: Yes

History
- Opened: 25 November 2003
- Closed: 2027 (estimated)

Services
Preceding station	Shanghai Metro	Following station
Dongchuan Road towards Xinzhuang	Line 5 branch	Huaning Road towards Minhang Development Zone
Location
- Location within Shanghai

Jinping Road (Chinese: 金平路; pinyin: Jīnpíng Lù) is a station on Line 5 of the Shanghai Metro. It is situated on the branch service of the line, between Dongchuan Road and Minhang Development Zone. Passengers can transfer to the main line at Dongchuan Road. However, since 26 December 2020, this is not the case, as trains have resumed service all the way to Xinzhuang.
