= Huanchengdong Road station =

Metro station in Shanghai, China

Huanchengdong Road 环城东路
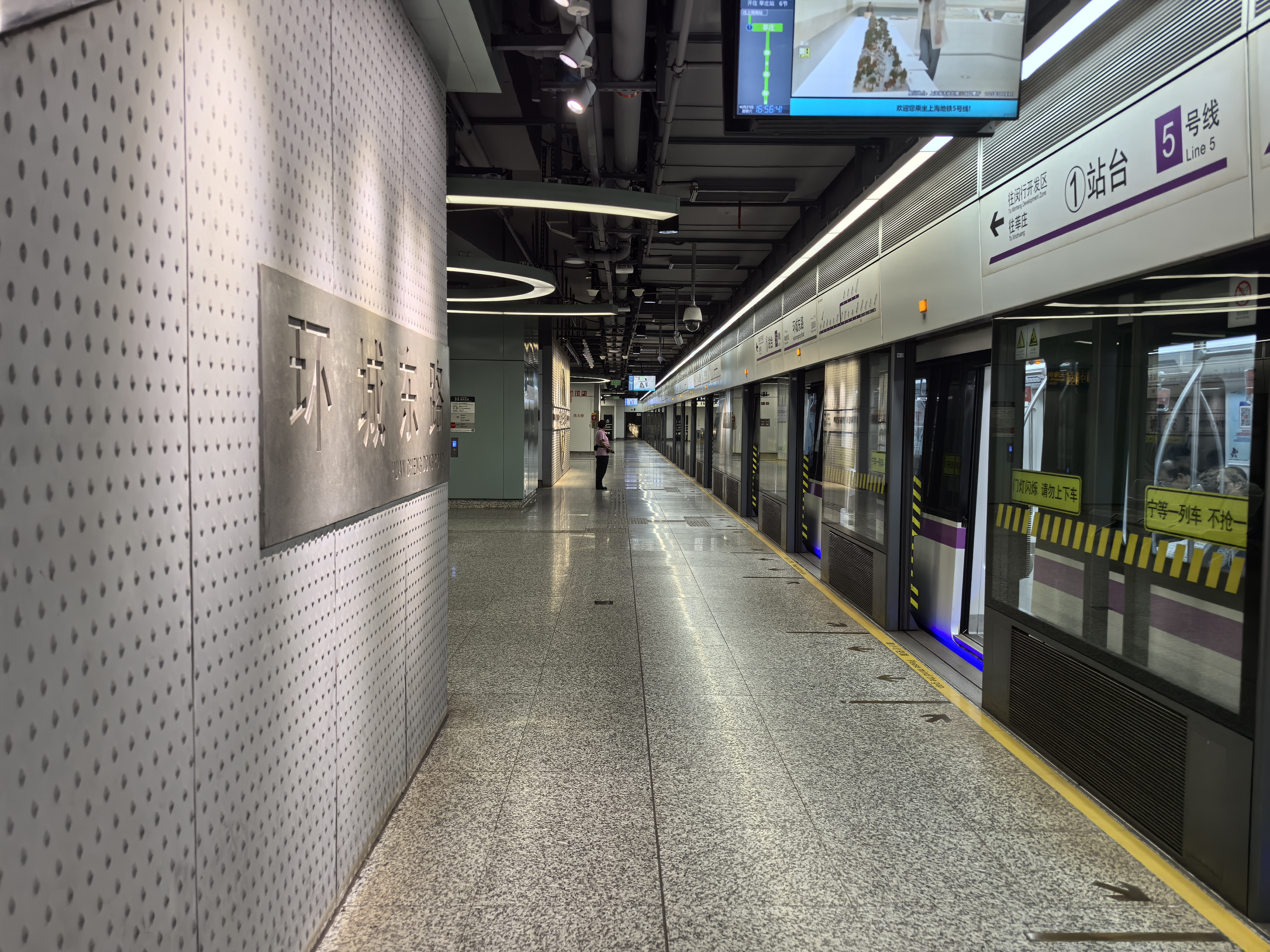
- Station platform, Xinzhuang-bound side

General information
- Other names: Huandong Road (former)
- Location: Nanqiao East Huancheng Road and Hangnan Highway; Fengxian District, Shanghai; China
- Coordinates: 30.933035°N 121.458852°E
- Operated by: Shanghai No. 1 Metro Operation Co. Ltd.
- Line: Line 5
- Platforms: 2 (1 island platform)
- Tracks: 2

Construction
- Structure type: Underground
- Accessible: Yes

History
- Opened: 30 December 2018

Services
Preceding station	Shanghai Metro	Following station
Fengpu Avenue towards Xinzhuang	Line 5	Wangyuan Road towards Fengxian Xincheng
Location

Huanchengdong Road (simplified Chinese: 环城东路; traditional Chinese: 環城東路; pinyin: Huánchéng Dōng Lù) is a station on Line 5 of the Shanghai Metro. Located at Nanqiao East Huancheng Road and Hangnan Highway in the city's Fengxian District, the station is located on the main branch of Line 5 and opened as part of the southern extension of Line 5 on 30 December 2018. It is an underground station. During the planning stages and early part of construction, it was known as Huandong Road (环东路; 環東路).

The station is located between Fengpu Avenue and Wangyuan Road.
