= Wangyuan Road station =

Metro station in Shanghai, China

Wangyuan Road 望园路
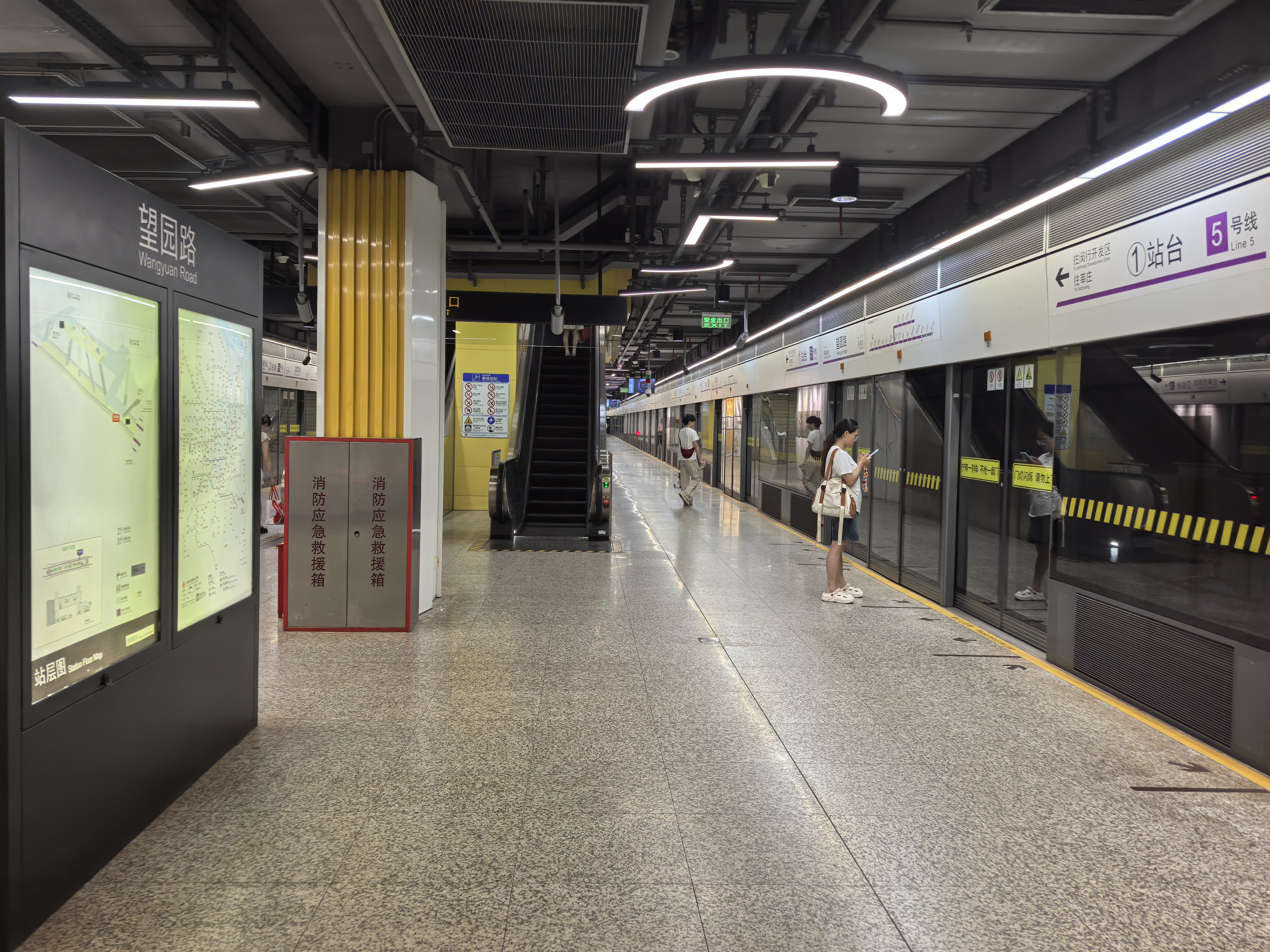
- Station platform, Xinzhuang-bound side

General information
- Location: Wangyuan Road and Hangnan Highway; Fengxian District, Shanghai; China
- Coordinates: 30.934190°N 121.478341°E
- Operator: Shanghai No. 1 Metro Operation Co. Ltd.
- Line: Line 5
- Platforms: 2 (1 island platform)
- Tracks: 2

Construction
- Structure type: Underground
- Accessible: Yes

History
- Opened: 30 December 2018

Services
Preceding station	Shanghai Metro	Following station
Huanchengdong Road towards Xinzhuang	Line 5	Jinhai Lake towards Fengxian Xincheng
Location

Wangyuan Road (simplified Chinese: 望园路; traditional Chinese: 望園路; pinyin: Wàngyuán Lù) is a station on Line 5 of the Shanghai Metro. Located at Wangyuan Road and Hangnan Highway in the city's Fengxian District, the station is located on the main branch of Line 5 and opened as part of the southern extension of Line 5 on 30 December 2018. It is an underground station.

The station is located between Huanchengdong Road and Jinhai Lake.
