= Xidu station =

Metro station in Shanghai, China

Xidu 西渡
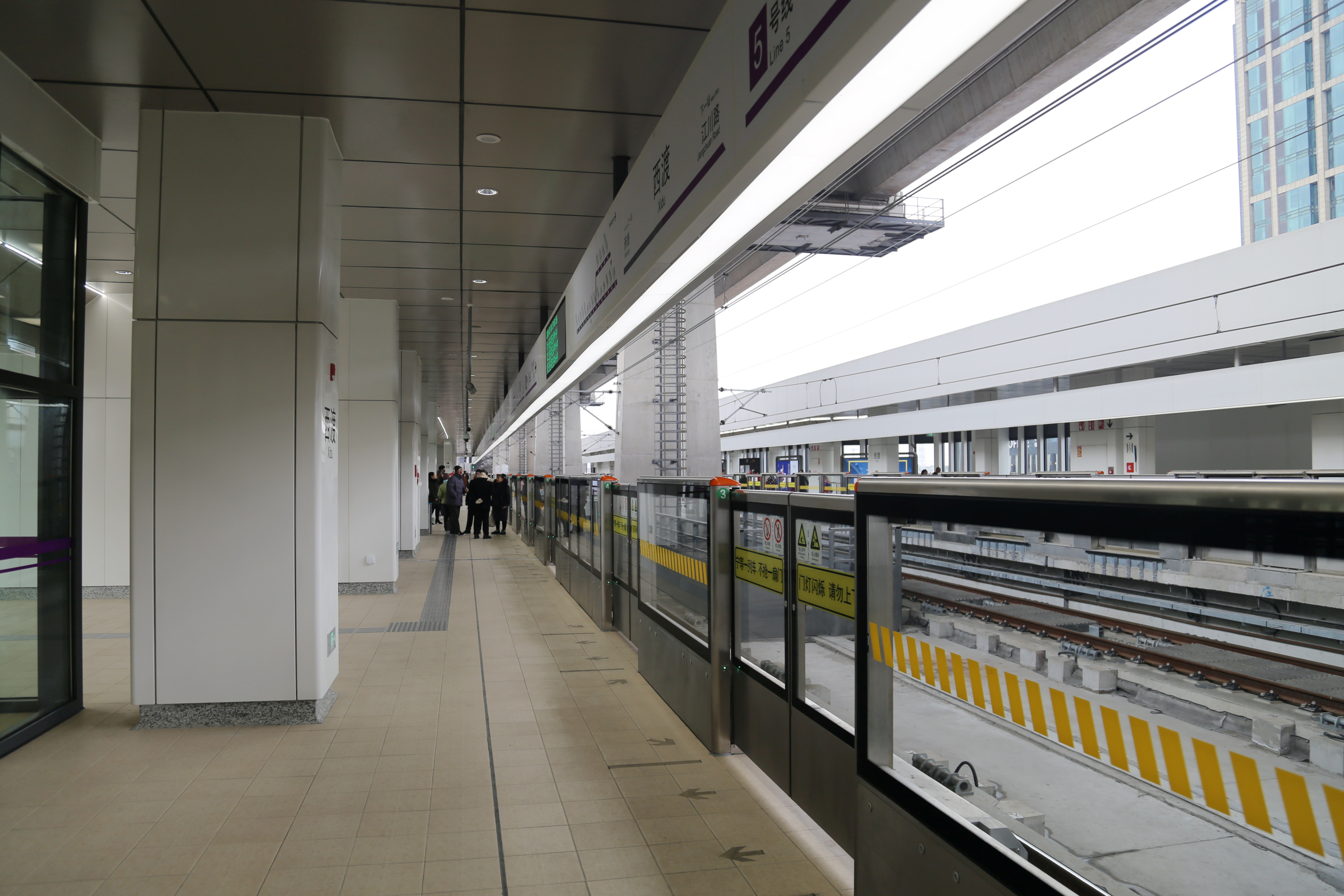
- Station platform, Xinzhuang-bound side

General information
- Location: Xizha Highway and Huhang Highway; Fengxian District, Shanghai; China
- Coordinates: 30.991050°N 121.427932°E
- Operated by: Shanghai No. 1 Metro Operation Co. Ltd.
- Line: Line 5
- Platforms: 2 (2 side platforms)
- Tracks: 2

Construction
- Structure type: Elevated
- Accessible: Yes

History
- Opened: 30 December 2018

Services
Preceding station	Shanghai Metro	Following station
Jiangchuan Road towards Xinzhuang	Line 5	Xiaotang towards Fengxian Xincheng
Location

Xidu (Chinese: 西渡; pinyin: Xīdù; lit. 'ferry pier in the west') is a station on Line 5 of the Shanghai Metro. Located at Xizha Highway and Huhang Highway in the city's Fengxian District, the station is located on the main branch of Line 5 and opened as part of the southern extension of Line 5 on 30 December 2018. It is an elevated station.

The station is located between Jiangchuan Road and Xiaotang. North of this station, Line 5 trains travel on the lower deck of the Minpu Second Bridge over the Huangpu River into the Minhang District.

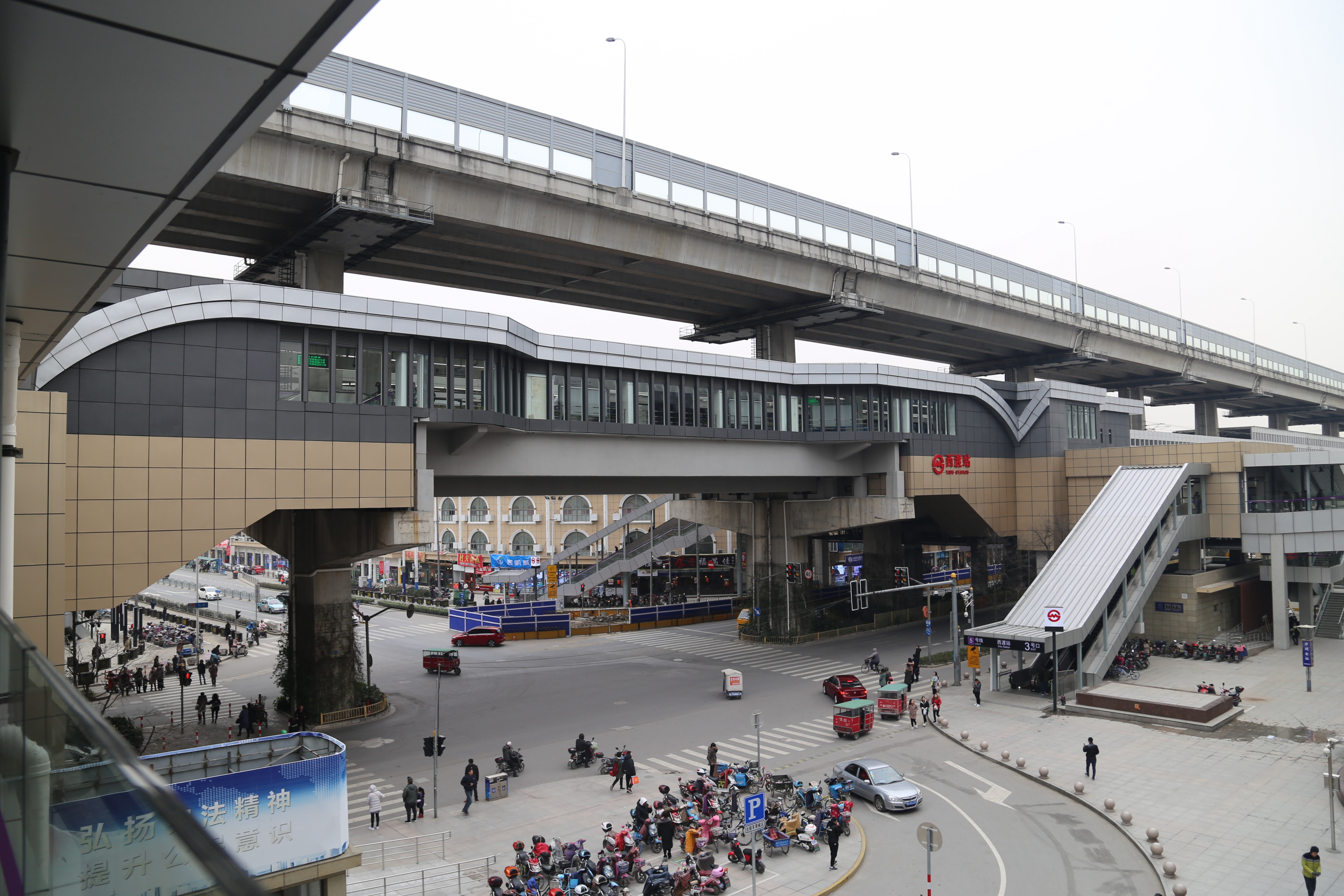
Station exterior, suspended over Xizha Highway and Huhang Highway
