= Fengpu Avenue station =

Metro station in Shanghai, China

Fengpu Avenue 奉浦大道
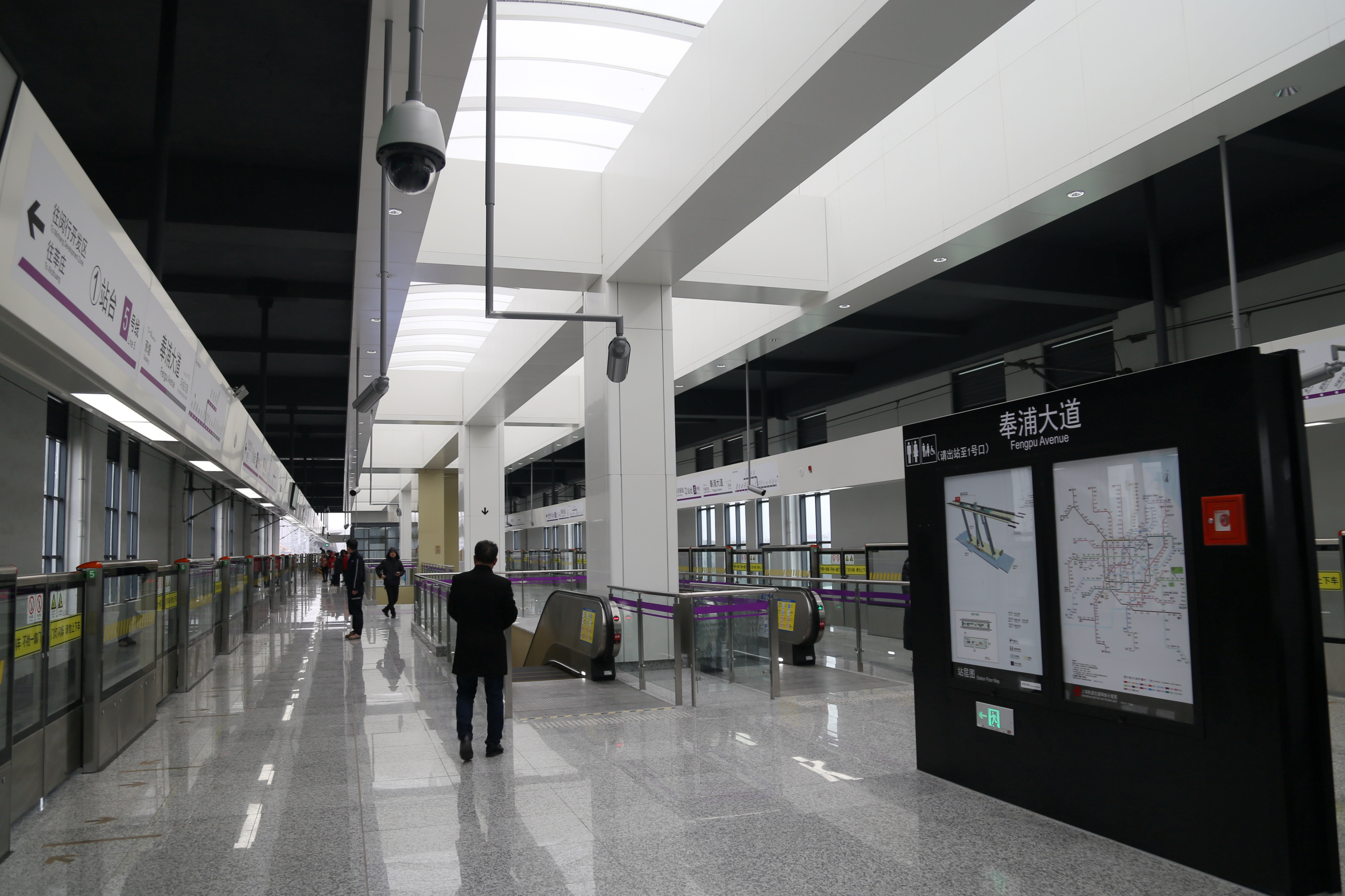
- Station platform

General information
- Other names: Fengpu (former)
- Location: Fengpu Avenue and Huhang Highway; Fengxian District, Shanghai; China
- Coordinates: 30.944055°N 121.444405°E
- Operated by: Shanghai No. 1 Metro Operation Co. Ltd.
- Line: Line 5
- Platforms: 2 (1 island platform)
- Tracks: 2

Construction
- Structure type: Elevated
- Accessible: Yes

History
- Opened: 30 December 2018

Services
Preceding station	Shanghai Metro	Following station
Xiaotang towards Xinzhuang	Line 5	Huanchengdong Road towards Fengxian Xincheng
Location

Fengpu Avenue (Chinese: 奉浦大道; pinyin: Fèngpǔ Dàdào) is a station on Line 5 of the Shanghai Metro. Located at Fengpu Avenue and Huhang Highway in the city's Fengxian District, the station is located on the main branch of Line 5 and opened as part of the southern extension of Line 5 on 30 December 2018. It is an elevated station. During the planning stages and early part of construction, it was known simply as Fengpu (奉浦).

The station is located between Xiaotang and Huanchengdong Road.
