= Xiaotang station =

Shanghai metro station

Xiaotang 萧塘
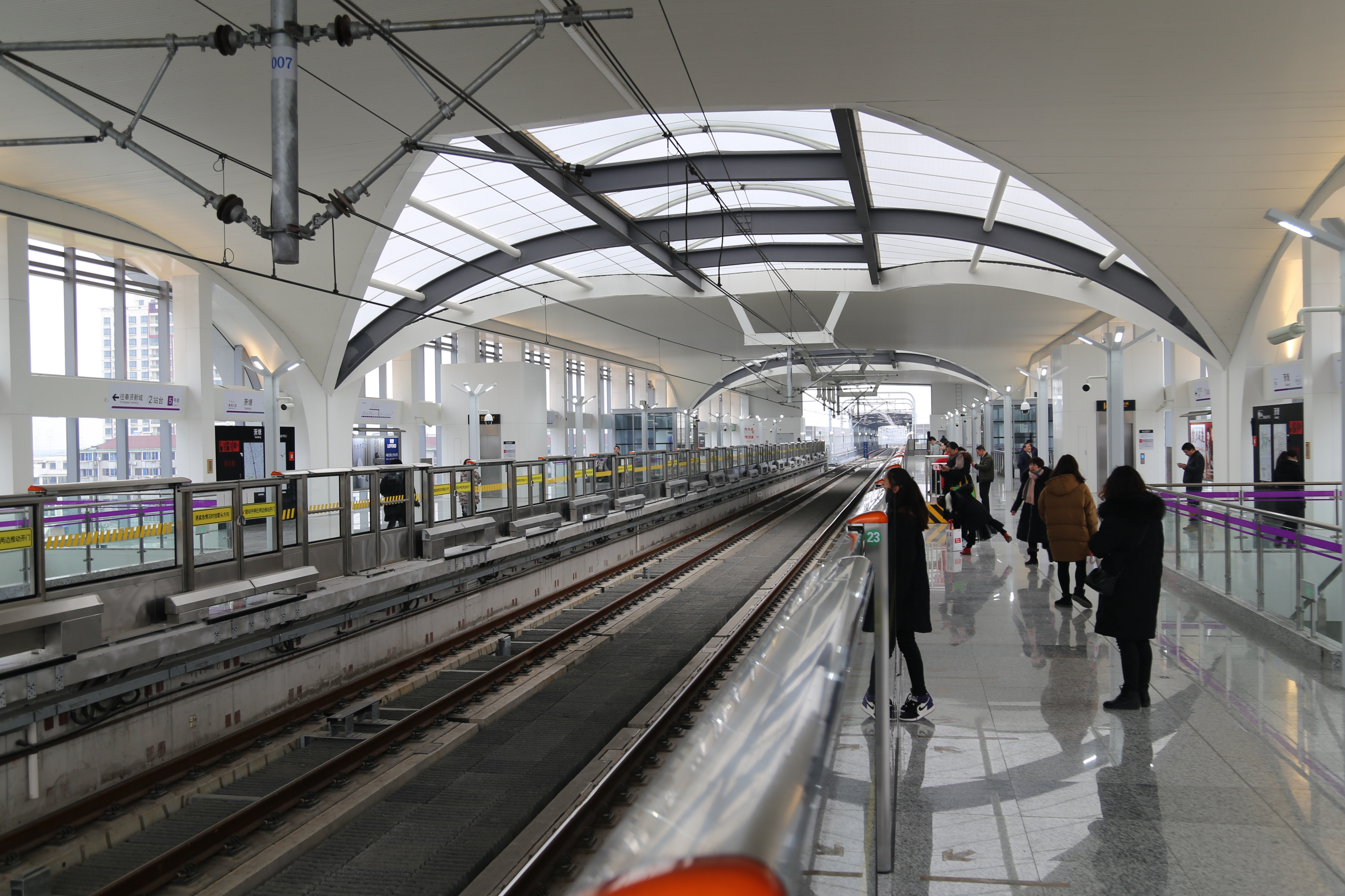
- Platform level, view from the Xinzhuang-bound platform

General information
- Location: Xiaotang Village, Daye Highway and Huhang Highway, Fengxian District, Shanghai; China
- Coordinates: 30.967986°N 121.437297°E
- Operated by: Shanghai No. 1 Metro Operation Co. Ltd.
- Line: Line 5
- Platforms: 2 (2 side platforms)
- Tracks: 2

Construction
- Structure type: Elevated
- Accessible: Yes

History
- Opened: 30 December 2018

Services
Preceding station	Shanghai Metro	Following station
Xidu towards Xinzhuang	Line 5	Fengpu Avenue towards Fengxian Xincheng
Location

Xiaotang (Chinese: 萧塘; pinyin: Xiāotáng) is a station on Line 5 of the Shanghai Metro. Located at Daye Highway and Huhang Highway within Xiaotang village in the city's Fengxian District, the station is located on the main branch of Line 5 and opened as part of the southern extension of Line 5 on 30 December 2018. It is an elevated station.

The station is located between Xidu and Fengpu Avenue.

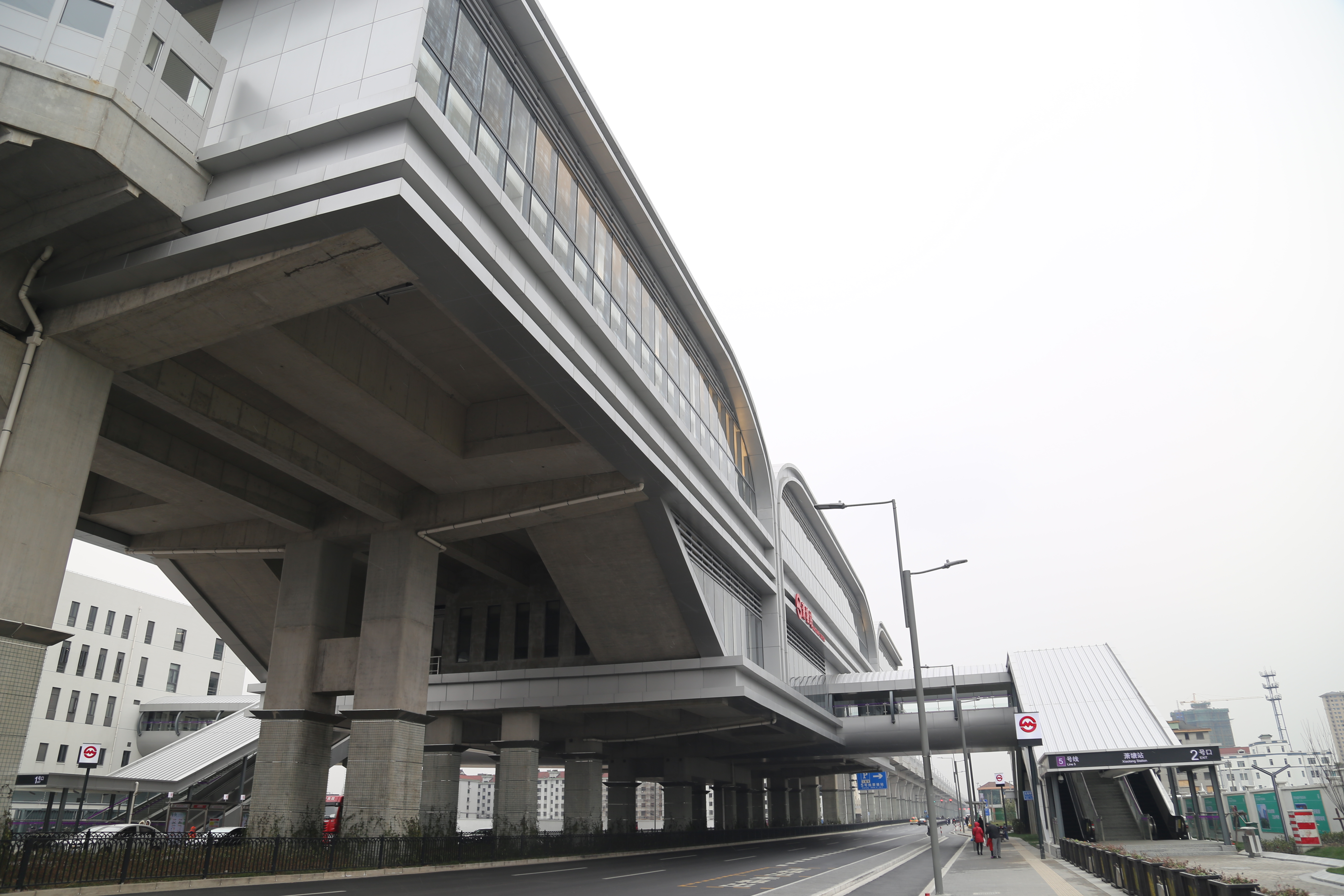
Station exterior
