= Dongchuan Road station =

Shanghai Metro station

Dongchuan Road 东川路
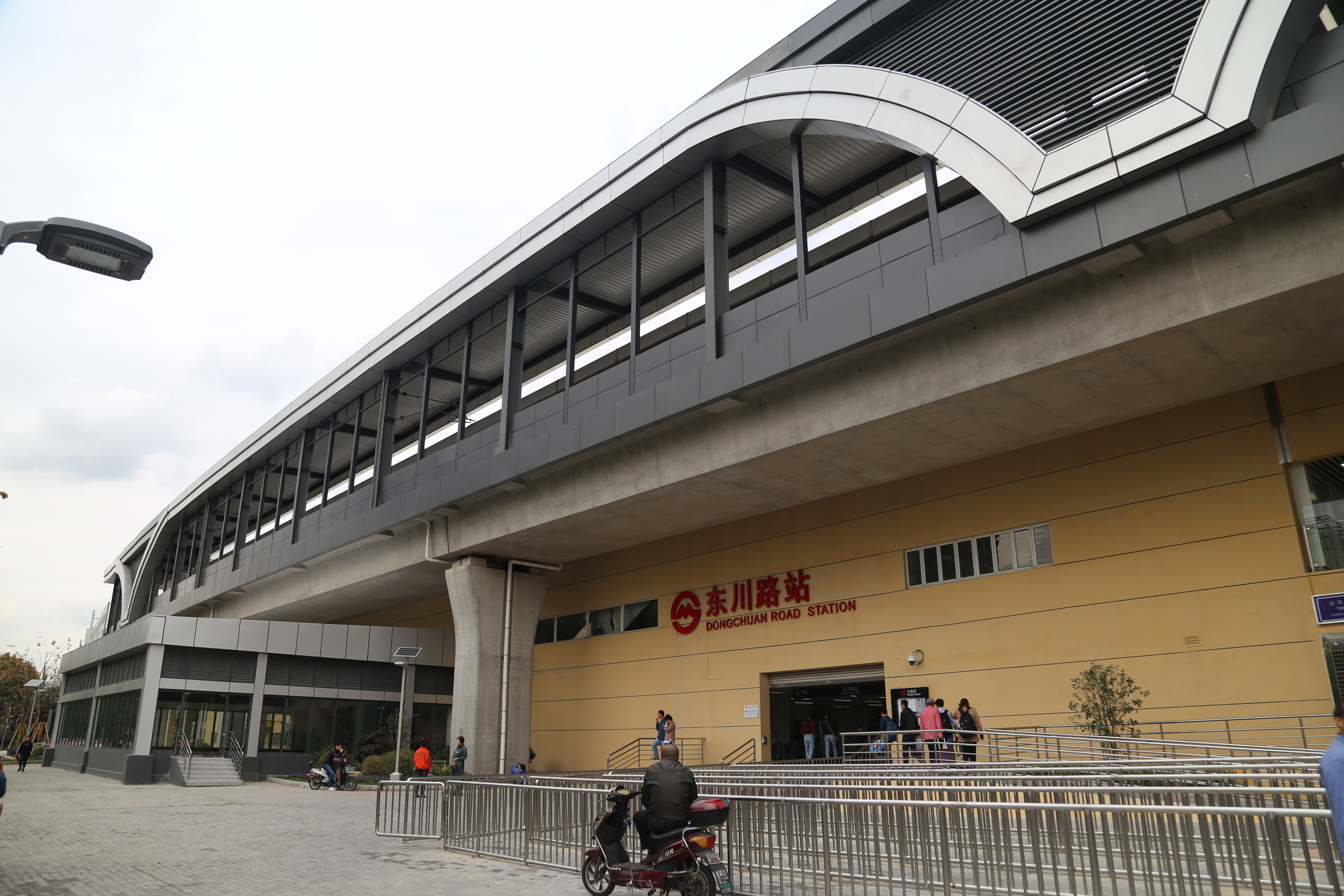
- Station exterior

General information
- Location: Humin Road and Dongchuan Road; Minhang District, Shanghai; China
- Coordinates: 31.020150°N 121.415206°E
- Operator: Shanghai No. 1 Metro Operation Co. Ltd.
- Lines: Line 5 (main and branch)
- Platforms: 4 (2 island platforms)
- Tracks: 4

Construction
- Structure type: Elevated
- Accessible: Yes

History
- Opened: 25 November 2003

Services
Preceding station	Shanghai Metro	Following station
Jianchuan Road towards Xinzhuang	Line 5	Jiangchuan Road towards Fengxian Xincheng
Jianchuan Road towards Xinzhuang	Line 5 branch	Jinping Road towards Minhang Development Zone
Location
- Location within Shanghai

Dongchuan Road (simplified Chinese: 东川路; traditional Chinese: 東川路; pinyin: Dōngchuān Lù) is a station on Line 5 of the Shanghai Metro. It serves as an interchange station between the main and branch lines of Line 5, with the opening of the southern extension of Line 5.

The Minhang Campus of Shanghai Jiao Tong University and the Minhang campus of East China Normal University are five minutes' walk away (there used to be a shuttle bus available for students and staff Monday-Friday during daylight hours, but this has stopped with the opening of a public bus line which serves an equivalent route), which makes this station popular with students at the university.

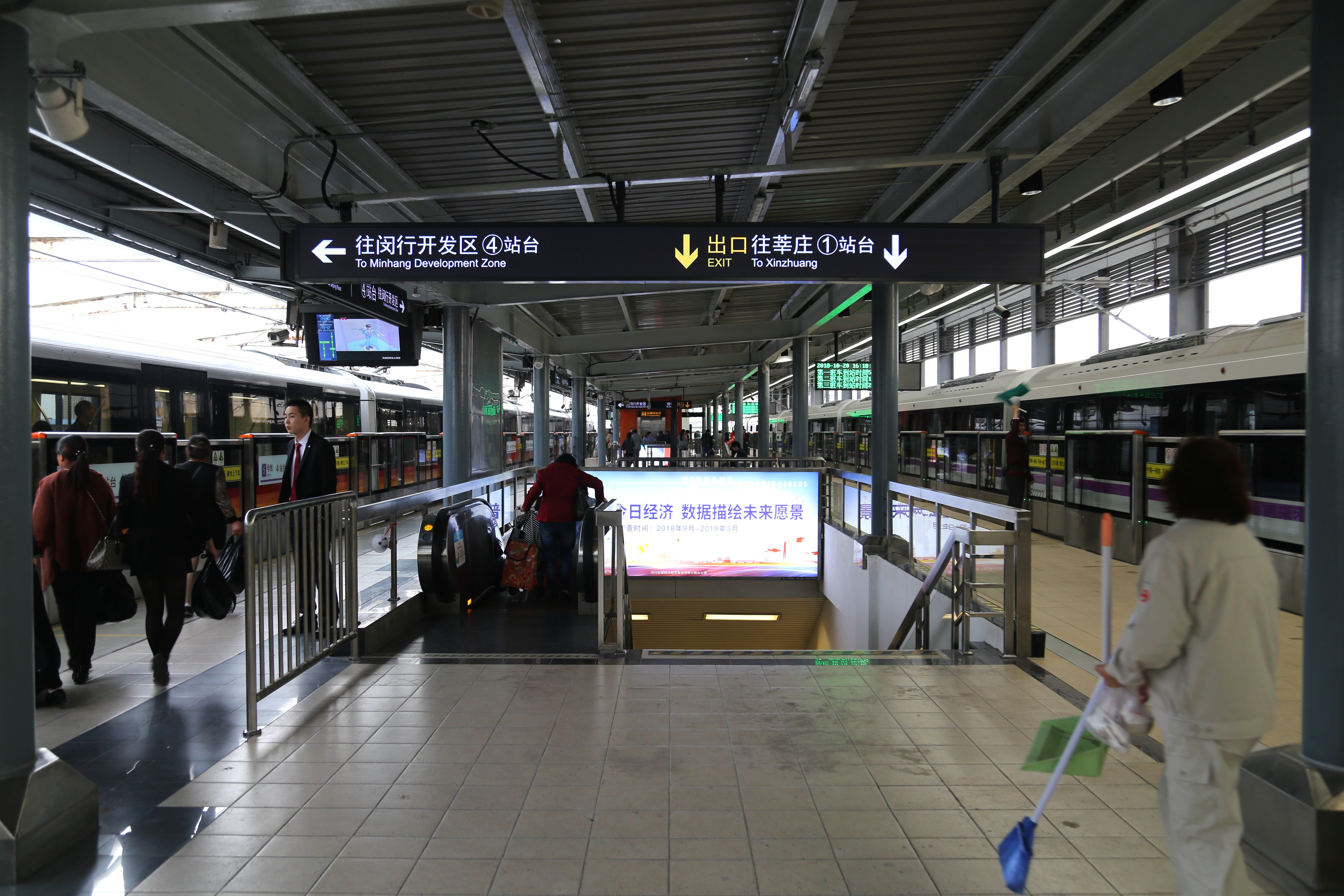
Island platform for Minhang Development Zone and Fengxian Xincheng-bound trains

== Station layout ==
3F	Northbound	← Line 5 towards Xinzhuang (Jianchuan Road)
3F	Island platform, doors open on the left, right
3F	Northbound	← Line 5 towards Xinzhuang (Jianchuan Road)
3F	Southbound	Line 5 towards Minhang Development Zone (Jinping Road) →
3F	Island platform, doors open on the left, right
3F	Southbound	Line 5 towards Fengxian Xincheng (Jiangchuan Road) →
2F	Equipment	No access to passengers
1F	Concourse	Exits 1-4, fare gates, station agent
