= Minhang Development Zone station =

Shanghai Metro station

Minhang Development Zone 闵行开发区
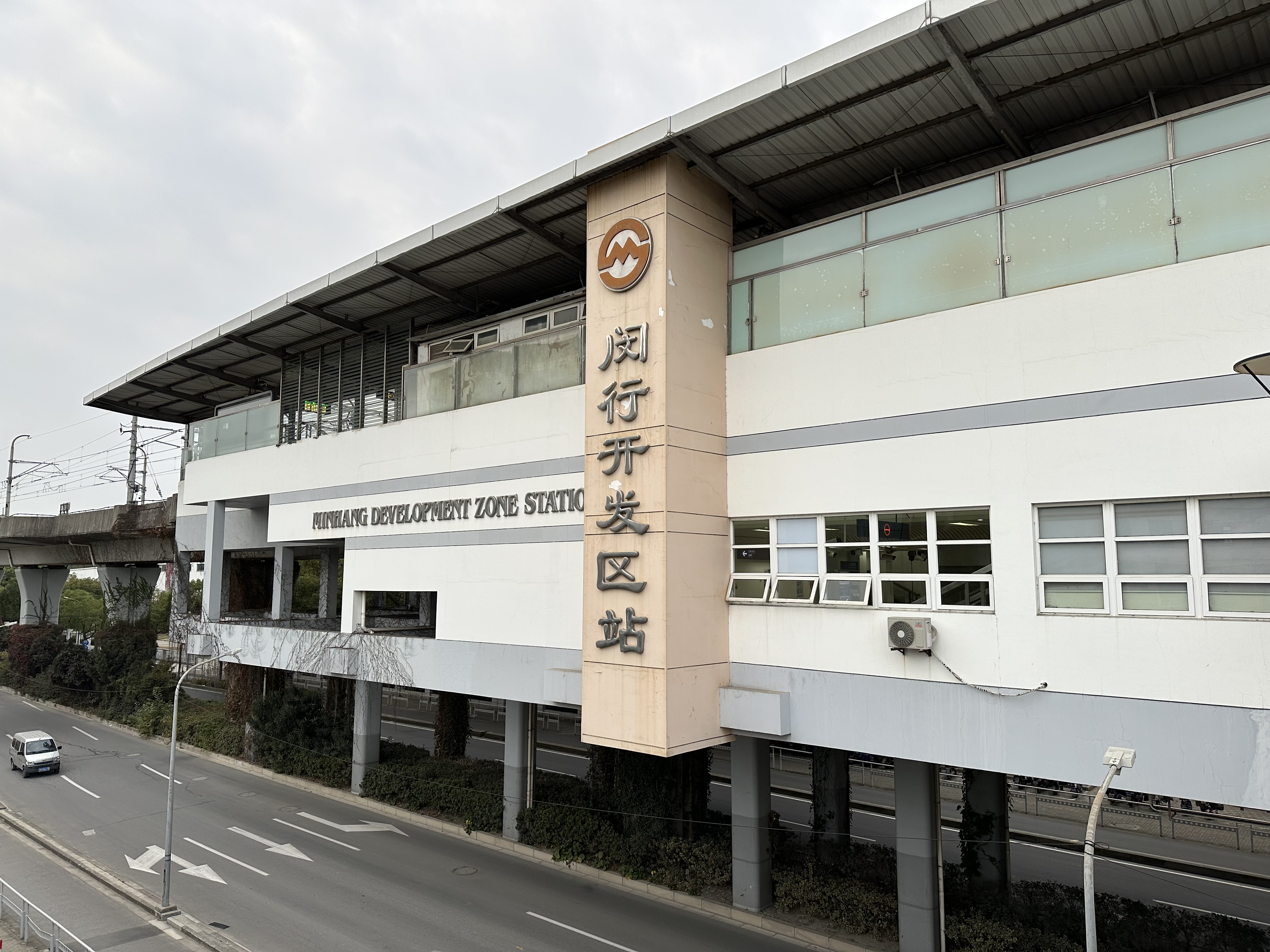
- Station exterior

General information
- Location: Shanghai; China
- Coordinates: 31.0025°N 121.365°E
- Operator: Shanghai No. 1 Metro Operation Co. Ltd.
- Line: Line 5
- Platforms: 2 (2 side platforms)
- Tracks: 2

Construction
- Structure type: Elevated
- Accessible: Yes

History
- Opened: 25 November 2003
- Closed: 2027 (estimated)

Services
Preceding station	Shanghai Metro	Following station
Wenjing Road towards Xinzhuang	Line 5 branch	Terminus
Location
- Location within Shanghai

Minhang Development Zone (simplified Chinese: 闵行开发区; traditional Chinese: 閔行開發區; pinyin: Mǐnháng Kāifāqū) is a metro station on Line 5 of the Shanghai Metro. It is the current southern terminus of the line, and is located in the suburban Minhang District. The zone is about 3.5 km^{2} (1.4 sq mi) in size and was opened in 1986. The location is close to the Outer-ringway giving the zone quick access to both airports of the city. The opening of Line 5 has significantly improved access to the central districts of Shanghai.

The station is located along the branch service of Line 5, which operates between this station and Dongchuan Road. Passengers can transfer to the main line at Dongchuan Road. However, since 26 December 2020, this is not the case, as trains have resumed service all the way to Xinzhuang.

The zone contains factories for companies that produce machinery, electronics, pharmaceuticals, beverages and entertainment products.

== Gallery ==
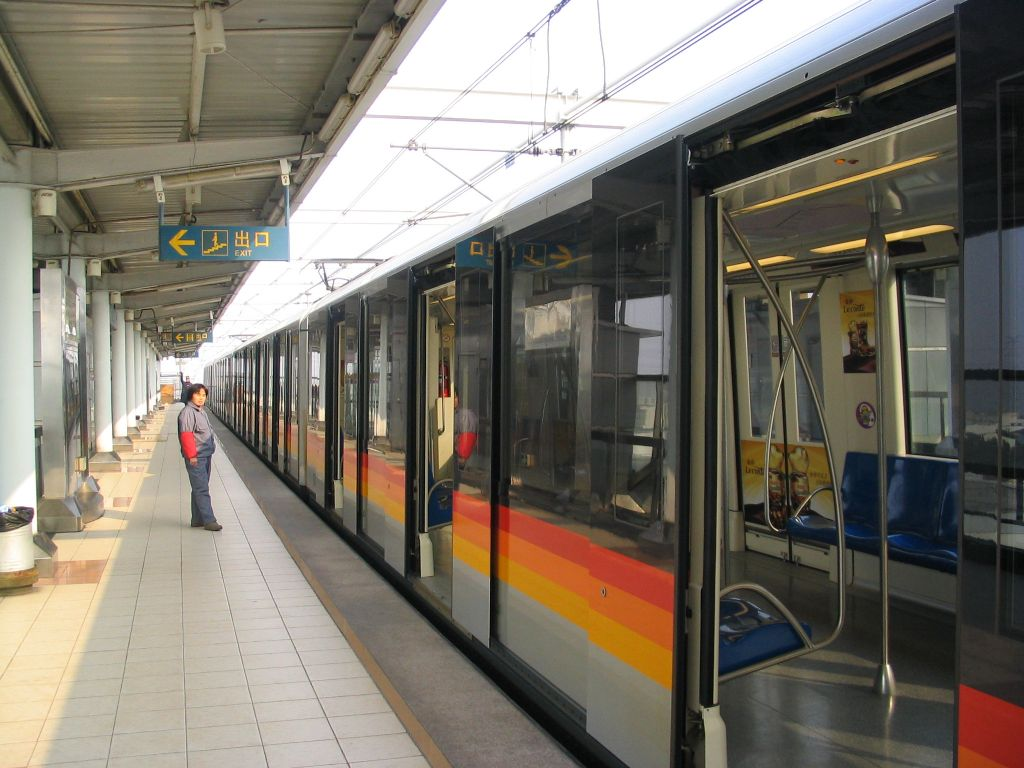
Platform prior to installment of screen doors

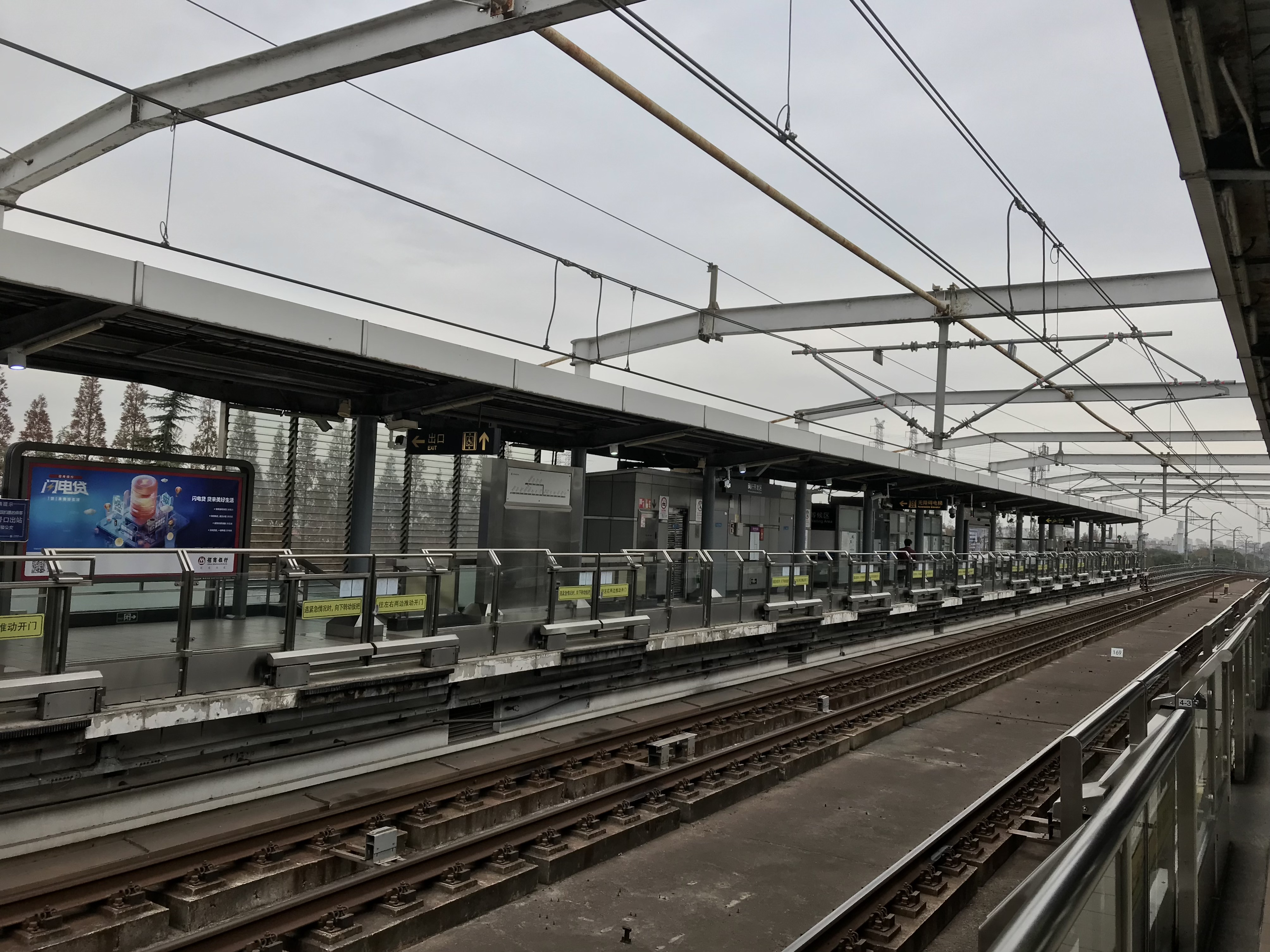
Train tracks in the station

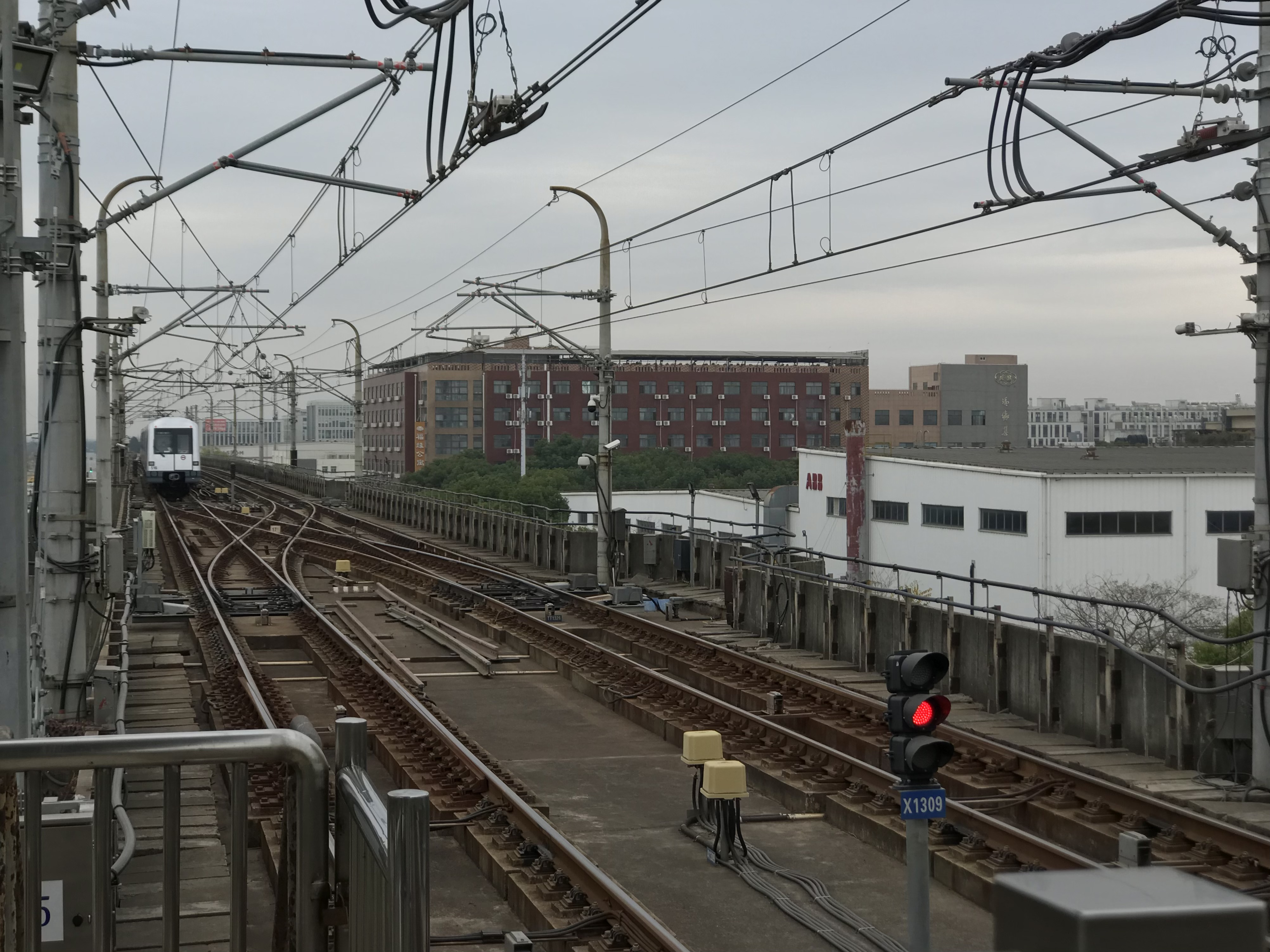
Line 5 trains changing derections
