= Chairman Mao Memorial Hall =

Final resting place of Mao Zedong

- 毛主席纪念堂
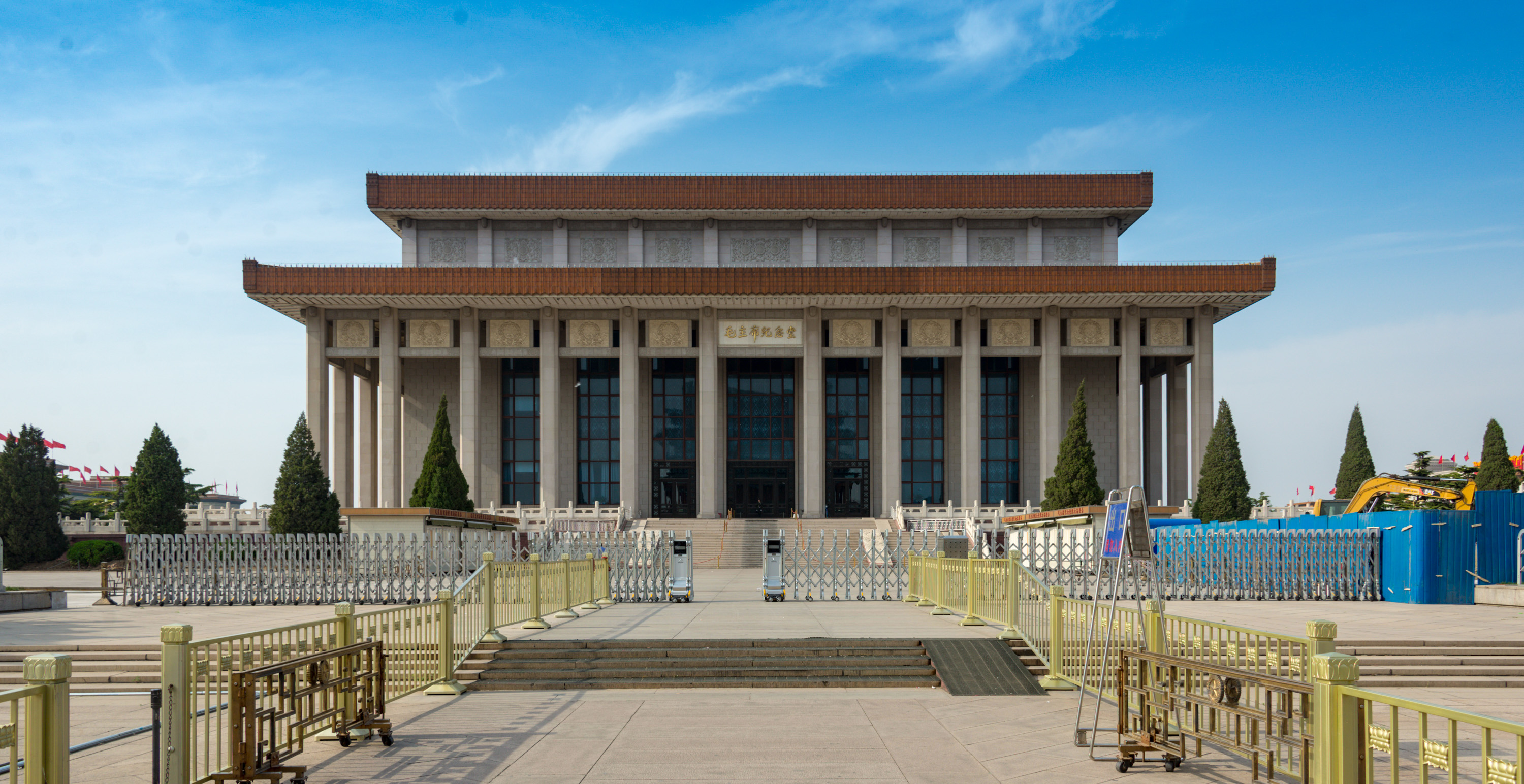
- Southside of the Chairman Mao Memorial Hall

General information
- Type: Memorial Hall, Mausoleum
- Location: Tiananmen Square, Beijing, China
- Coordinates: 39°54′04″N 116°23′29″E
- Named for: Mao Zedong
- Groundbreaking: November 24, 1976
- Completed: May 24, 1977
- Renovated: 1997–1998

Design and construction
- Known for: Final resting place of Mao Zedong

Website
- jnt.mfu.com.cn

The Chairman Mao Memorial Hall (simplified Chinese: 毛主席纪念堂; traditional Chinese: 毛主席紀念堂; pinyin: Máo Zhǔxí Jìniàn Táng), also called the Mausoleum of Mao Zedong and colloquially known as the Maosoleum is the final resting place of Mao Zedong, who was the Founding Father of the People's Republic of China and chairman of the Chinese Communist Party (CCP) until his death in 1976. Mao's embalmed body is publicly displayed inside.

The Memorial Hall began construction shortly after his death. It is located in the middle of Tiananmen Square in Beijing on the previous site of the Gate of China, the southern (main) gate of the Imperial City during the Ming and Qing dynasties.

== Background ==
In the 1950's, Mao made a statement that all leading comrades in China should be cremated upon death. The statement made clear that there were to be no mausoleums nor grave sites for Party leaders. The document titled "Proposal to Carry out Cremation" finalized this statement. Mao was the first to add his signature to this document. The main purpose of modern preservation was to showcase the leader’s remains as the symbol of sovereign power, which was inconsistent with the principles of the Communist Party. Thus this pledge of cremation was consistent with the principles of the Communist Party. Following Mao’s death, senior Party leaders initially agreed that Mao’s body should be temporarily preserved and displayed inside the Great Hall of the People to allow the Chinese people to pay their last respects. However, a few days after this display, the Party decided to permanently preserve Mao's remains. The cremation document was eventually overruled as Mao’s preserved body presently resides in and is subsequently displayed in the Memorial Hall. The historical consensus is that there are no reliable records available to demonstrate how Party leadership reached the decision to preserve his body.

== History ==
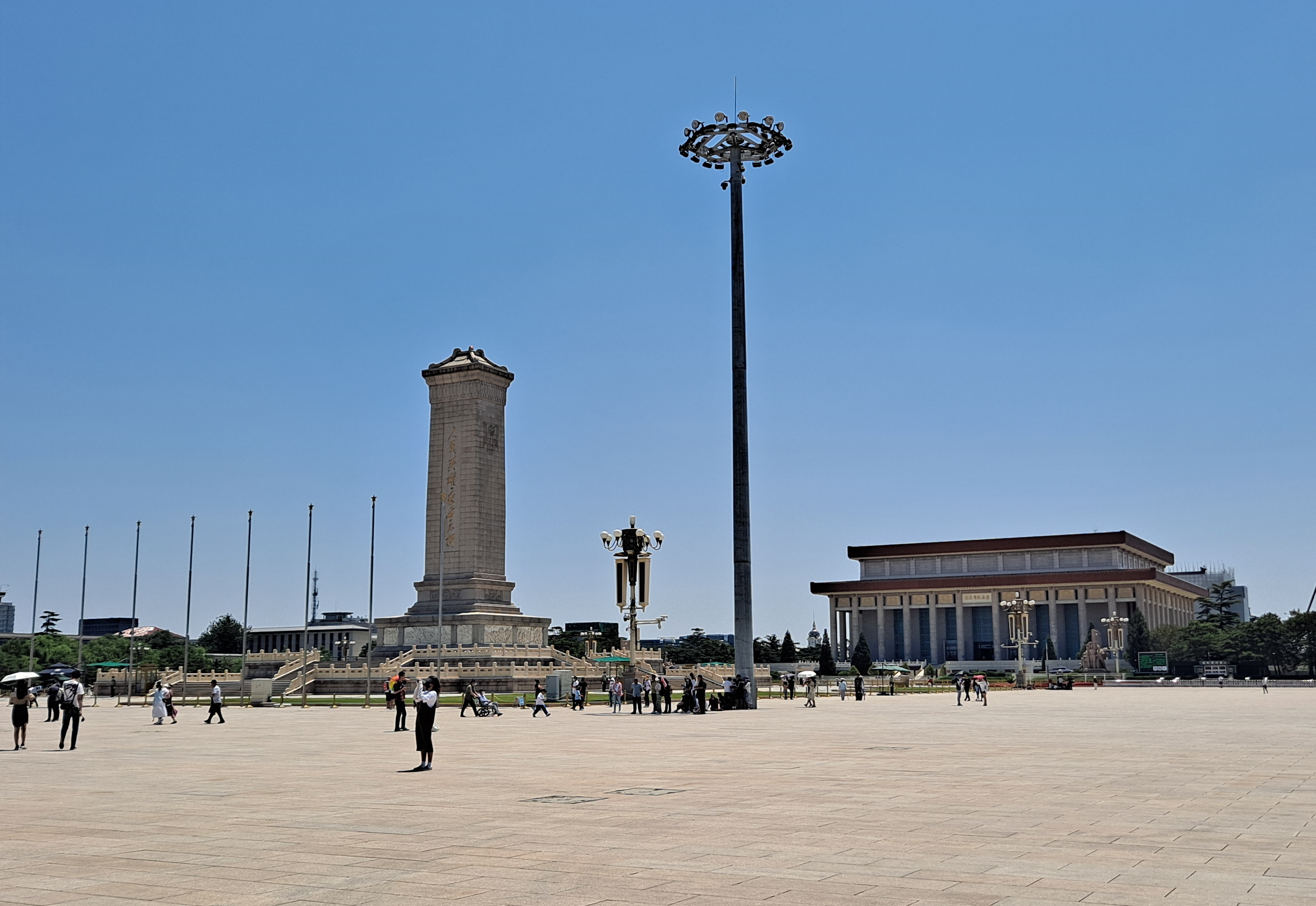
The Memorial Hall is located on Tiananmen Square, where the Beijing Gate of China used to stand

The Memorial Hall began construction soon after Mao's death on September 9, 1976. On September 14, 1976, the State Planning Commission of China organized designers from more than ten units in eight provinces and cities in China to gather at the Qianmen Hotel in Beijing to start the site selection and scheme designs of Chairman Mao's Memorial Hall. The planning and design leading group consisted of Zhao Pengfei, Yuan Jingshi, Shen Bo, etc., who participated in the design from the China Academy of Building Research, Beijing Municipal Bureau of Planning, Beijing Municipal Architectural Design and Research Institute, Tsinghua University, Tianjin University, Shanghai Municipal Civil Architecture Design Institute, Guangdong Provincial Architectural Design and Research Institute, Guangzhou Municipal Architectural Design and Research Institute, Nanjing Engineering Institute, China Architecture Northwest Design and Research Institute, Liaoning Provincial Architectural Design and Research Institute, Heilongjiang Provincial Architectural Design and Research Institute, the Chinese People's Liberation Army Basic Construction Engineering Corps Design and Research Institute. After the study by the experts and leaders concerned, it was recognized that the better location options were Fragrant Hills, Tiananmen Square and Jingshan.

On October 8, 1976, the Decision of the Central Committee of the Chinese Communist Party, the Standing Committee of the National People's Congress, the State Council of the People's Republic of China, and the Central Military Commission on the Establishment of a Memorial Hall for Chairman Mao Zedong, the Great Leader and Tutor, was issued. This decision was made on the same day as the official announcement declaring that the Gang of Four had been arrested.

On October 15, 1976, the Beijing Architectural Design and Research Institute set up the Planning and Design Group of the Memorial Hall of Chairman Mao. On November 6, 1976, the Political Bureau of the CCP Central Committee reviewed the plan of Chairman Mao's Memorial Hall. On November 9, 1976, Chairman Mao's Memorial Hall Project Command was established, with Li Ruihuan, then deputy director of the Beijing Municipal Construction Committee, as the chief commander. The Ninth Office of the State Council ("Ninth Office") was specially set up to coordinate the construction of Chairman Mao's Memorial Hall, and Vice Premier Gu Mu was in charge of the leadership of the Ninth Office and the construction of the Memorial Hall. Xiao Yang, the former director of the Beijing Glass Factory, and Han Boping, the former vice mayor of Beijing, were members of the Ninth Office, and together they were responsible for the work of the equipment group of Chairman Mao's Memorial Hall. On November 24, 1976, the Political Bureau of the CCP Central Committee finalized the plan of Chairman Mao Memorial Hall and the foundation stone of the Hall was laid. Hua Guofeng, then the Chairman of the CCP Central Committee, Premier of the State Council, and Chairman of the Central Military Commission, participated in the groundbreaking ceremony and laid the soil for the cornerstone of the Memorial Hall.

People throughout China were involved in the design and construction of the Memorial Hall, with 700,000 people from different provinces, autonomous regions, and nationalities doing symbolic voluntary labor. Materials from all over China were used throughout the building: granite from Sichuan province, porcelain plates from Guangdong province, pine trees from Yan'an in Shaanxi province, saw-wort seeds from the Tian Shan mountains in the Xinjiang Autonomous Region, soil from quake-stricken Tangshan, colored pebbles from Nanjing, milky quartz from the Kunlun Mountains, pine logs from Jiangxi province, and rock samples from Mount Everest.

On May 24, 1977, the construction of Chairman Mao's Memorial Hall was completed. On August 22, 1977, the delegates to the 11th CCP National Congress visited Mao Zedong's remains, and the communiqué of the 1st Plenary Session of the 11th Central Committee of the CCP was published on the same day. On August 31, 1977, President Josip Broz Tito of Yugoslavia went to visit Chairman Mao's Memorial Hall to admire the remains of Mao Zedong. On September 9, 1977, the CCP Central Committee, the Standing Committee of the National People's Congress, the State Council, and the Central Military Commission held a "Commemoration of the First Anniversary of the Death of the Great Leader and Mentor, Chairman Mao, and the Inauguration of Chairman Mao Memorial Hall". Since then, representatives from all provinces, autonomous regions and municipalities directly under the central government have come to pay their respects.

The Memorial Hall was closed for renovations for nine months in 1997 before reopening on January 6, 1998. After that, the CCP Central Committee has held commemorative activities here on the occasion of the 90th, 100th, 110th and 120th anniversaries of the birth of Mao Zedong.

== Legacy ==
The Memorial Hall housing Chairman Mao’s body stands in the centre of Tiananmen Square. Tiananmen Square is regarded as the most sacred space in the People's Republic of China. After Mao and the CCP took power in 1949, Tiananmen Square had become a self-contained political symbol that was an embodiment of the CCP and its leadership. The choice to construct the Memorial Hall in this central location was done to reflect deeper meanings within Chinese history. The intent was not to immortalize Mao as an Imperial Ruler, as CCP leadership viewed the historical Imperial Chinese rulers as members of the exploiting class. Through the eyes of the CCP, this decision instead was meant to glorify the achievements of a modern revolutionary leader (traditional Chinese: 座紀念無產階級革命家光輝一生的紀念堂; pinyin: Zuò jìniàn wúchǎn jiējí gémìngjiā guānghuī yīshēng de jìniàn táng). The CCP believed the Memorial Hall stood as a symbol of unity amongst the various people and factions that had become deeply divided by the politics of the Cultural Revolution. At the northern entrance to the Memorial Hall stands a three metre tall statue of Mao Zedong which faces the Imperial City. Behind the statue hangs a large landscape painting, depicting magnificent mountains and rivers, in an attempt to symbolize the merging of Mao Zedong Thought with the Chinese landscape.

=== Cultural Revolution ===
During the Cultural Revolution, there was a dramatic increase in the intensification of Mao's personality cult. The Mao Cult would eventually progress into a following of grand scale that would dwarf even the Stalin cult at its peak. The worship of Mao Zedong Thought was not seen only as the worship of a figure, but the worship of truth. During the Cultural Revolution, there was a massive rise in commemorative architecture dedicated to Mao Zedong such as the Long Live halls (simplified Chinese: 万岁馆; pinyin: Wànsuì guǎn). Some scholars recognize this rise in commemorative architecture as immediate precursors of the Memorial Hall. During the Cultural Revolution, there were several instances in which Mao had to intervene against a further elaboration of his personality cult. This was done as a precaution so that senior ranking Party members would not use the Mao cult to strengthen their political positions.

=== Post-Cultural Revolution ===
Originally, Mao had been the only figure who was displayed in the Memorial Hall. Though in 1983 the Central Committee of the Chinese Communist Party decided that Mao’s mausoleum would be shared with other revolutionaries. The current Memorial Hall is dedicated to the lives of four revolutionary leaders: Mao Zedong, Zhou Enlai, Liu Shaoqi, and Zhu De. This change was made to recall the great achievements of the first-generation CCP leadership without evoking visions of turmoil during the Cultural Revolution.

== Design ==
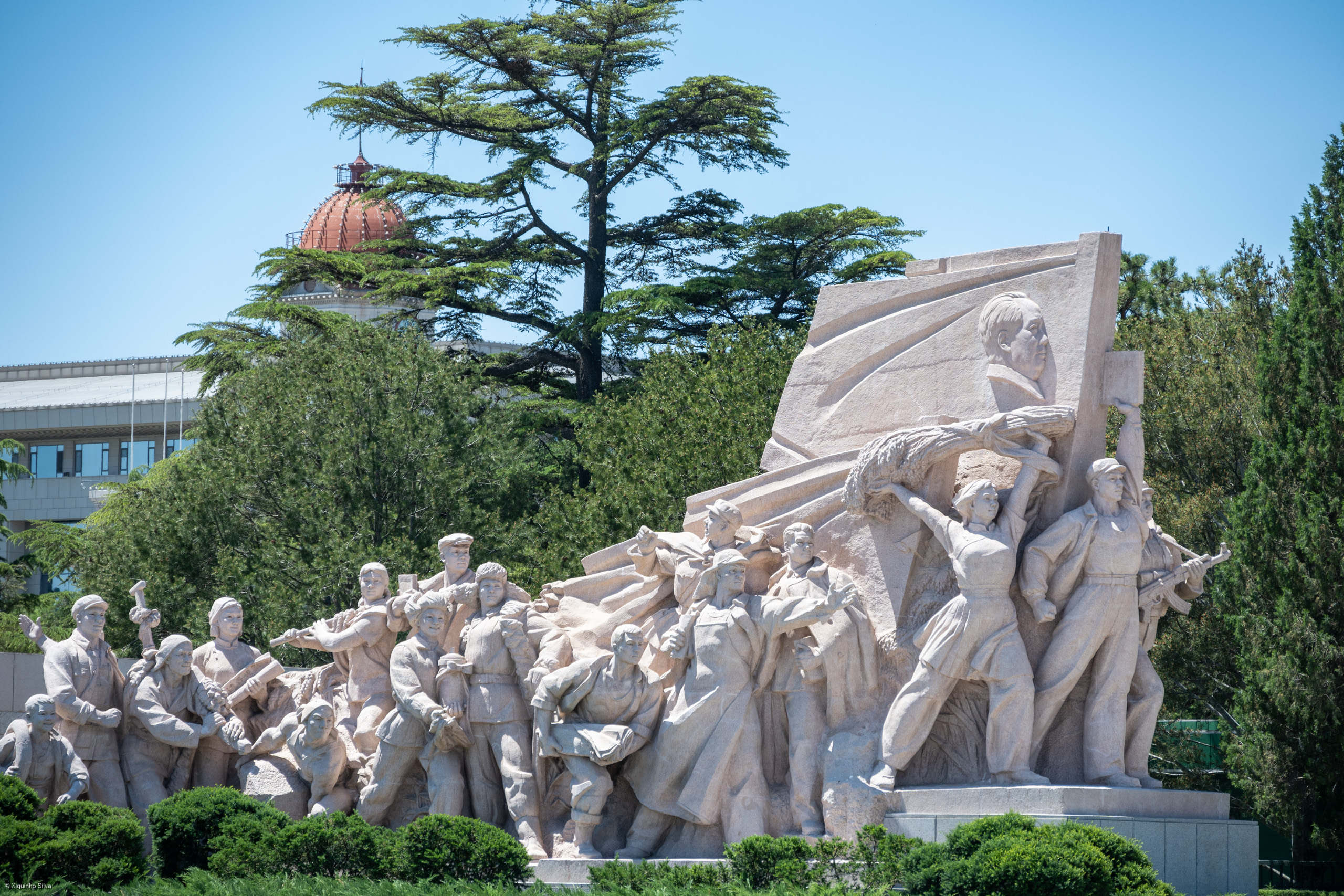
One of four sculptures located near the entrance and exit of the Memorial Hall

The building's design is intended to incorporate traditional Chinese aesthetics without invoking the themes of imperial tombs. Gu Mu instructed the architects that the design should glorify revolutionary achievement. The design of the building features Mao’s body as the embodiment of Chinese history and nation. The Mausoleum incorporates materials from throughout China.

=== Sculptures ===
The North Hall contains the alabaster seated statue of Chairman Mao Zedong. Chairman of the CCP Central Committee Hua Guofeng, Vice Chairman Ye Jianying and other central leaders personally reviewed the draft and selected the plan for the statue of Chairman Mao. In the creation of the statue, there were always two options for the seated figure, with or without crossing the legs. The central government chose the option of crossing the legs. After the statue was made, someone thought that the cross-legged statue was vivid and friendly, but it did not harmonize well with the solemn atmosphere of the Memorial Hall. The Central Committee studied and discussed these views and decided to rebuild a flat-legged statue to replace the cross-legged one. However, the implementation of this decision was very cumbersome, and finally Deng Xiaoping decided that there was no need to replace it, so the statue remained cross-legged.

There are four sculpture groups in the square, all of which are made of clay, one on each side of the east and west sides of the main gate in the north, and one on each side of the east and west sides of the back gate in the south. The sculpture on the east side of the north gate shows the democratic revolution. The sculpture on the west side of the north gate represents the socialist revolution and industrial construction. The two sculptures on both sides of the south gate represent the inheritance of the will and the continuation of the revolution.

== Access and visitation ==
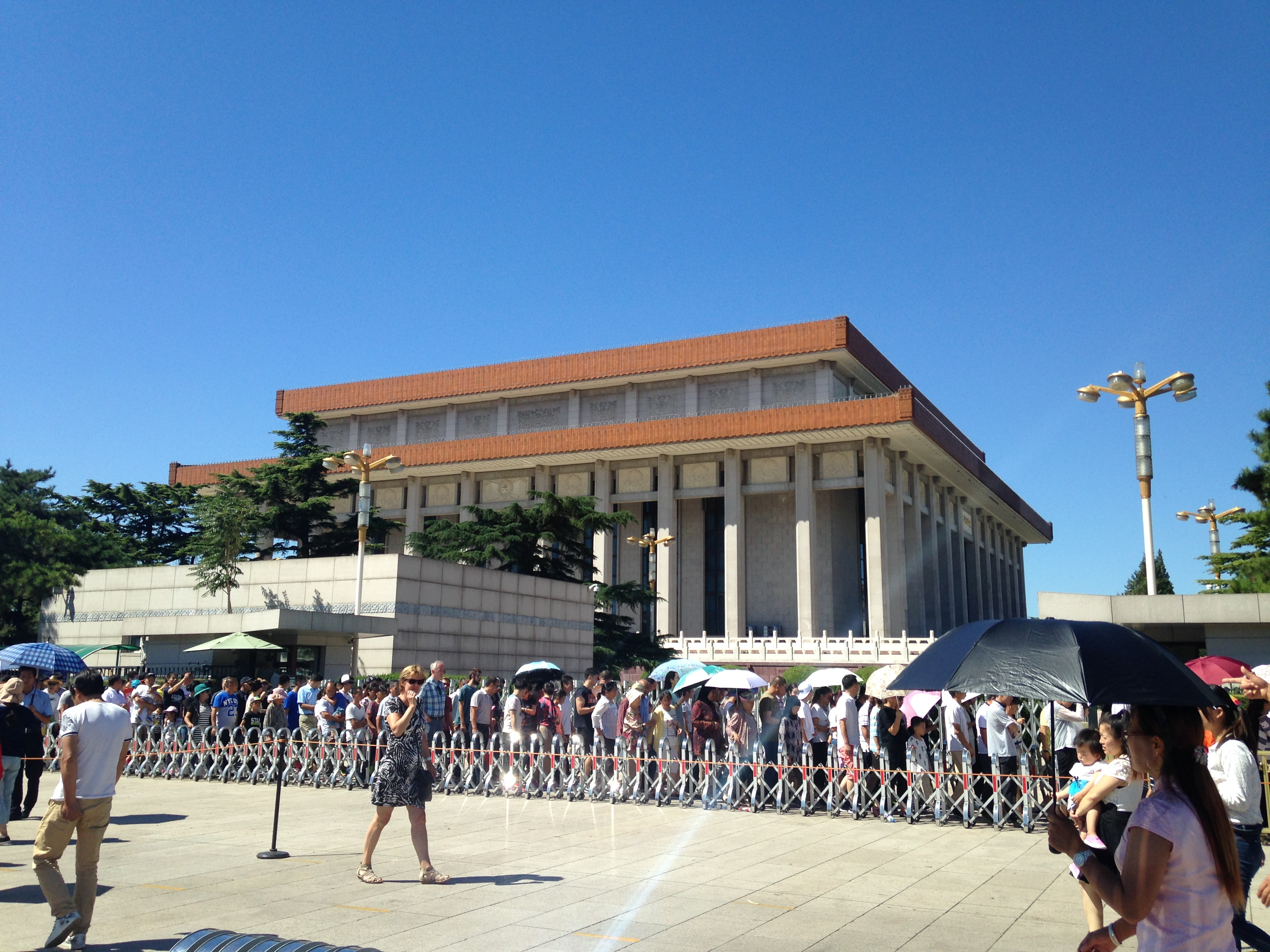
A queue to enter the Memorial Hall

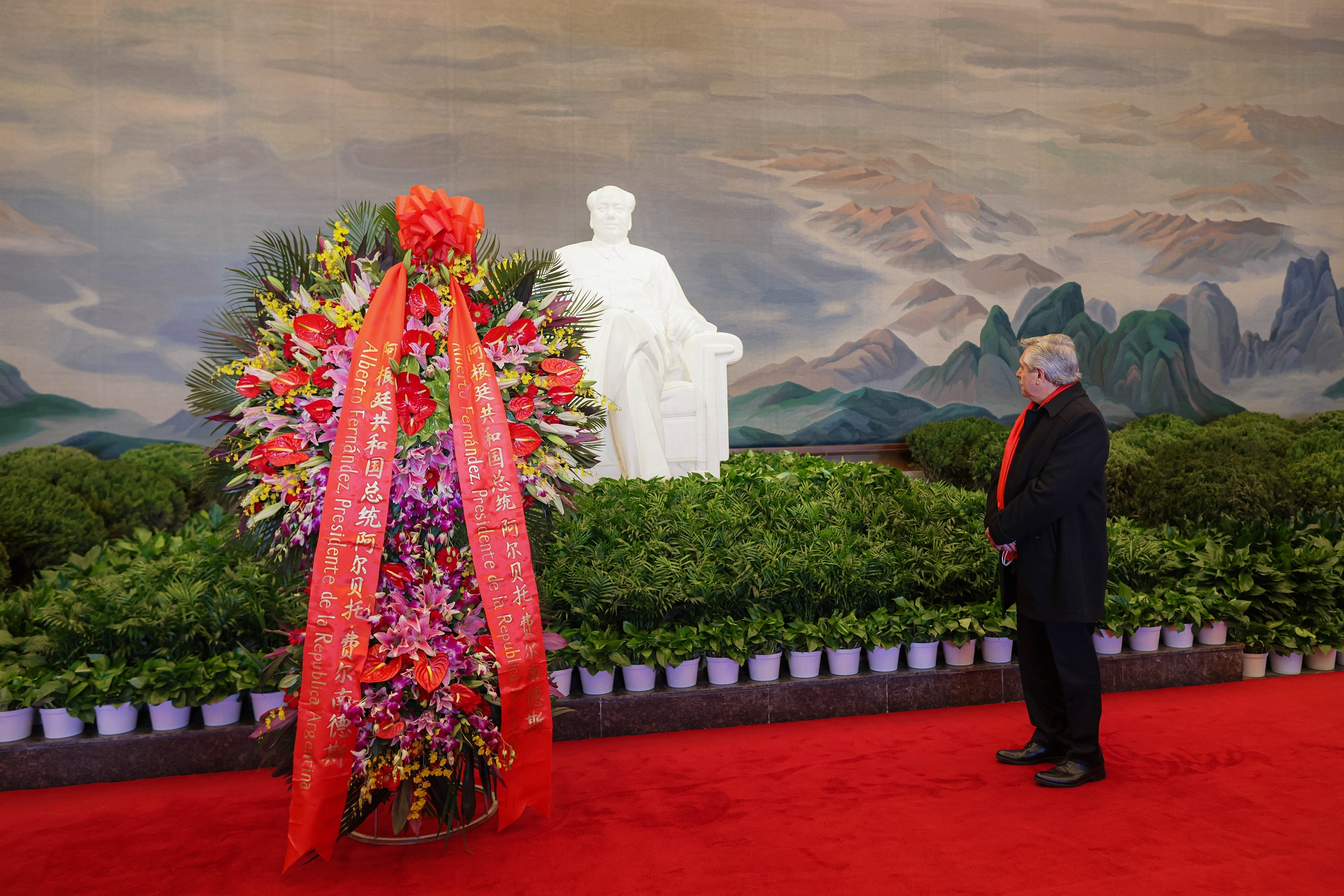
Argentinian president Alberto Fernández visiting the Chairman Mao Memorial Hall in 2022

The Memorial Hall today remains a popular destination in Beijing, and is often visited by foreign dignitaries and Chinese Communist Party officials. Entrance to the Memorial Hall is free, although a valid passport is required to be granted entry. Reservations for visitation can be made through WeChat, though the service does not offer an English language option for visitors.

Foreign heads of state, such as Cuban leader Fidel Castro and Venezuelan President Nicolas Maduro visited the Memorial Hall during their state trips to China. On 29 September 2019, CCP general secretary Xi Jinping along with other Politburo members of the Chinese Communist Party visited the Chairman Mao Memorial Hall.

== See also ==
- Mao Zedong's Former Residence and Memorial Museum in Shaoshan
- Mausoleum of Hua Guofeng
- Zhou Enlai Memorial Hall in Huaian
- Memorial to Zhou Enlai and Deng Yingchao
- Deng Xiaoping's Former Residence and Memorial Hall in Guangan
- Zhu De Memorial Hall
- Babaoshan Revolutionary Cemetery
- Kumsusan Palace of the Sun
- Ho Chi Minh Mausoleum
- Lenin's Mausoleum
- Sun Yat-sen Mausoleum
- Communist mummies
