= Moller Villa =

Building in Shanghai, China

Coordinates: 31°13′29.90″N 121°27′7.12″E

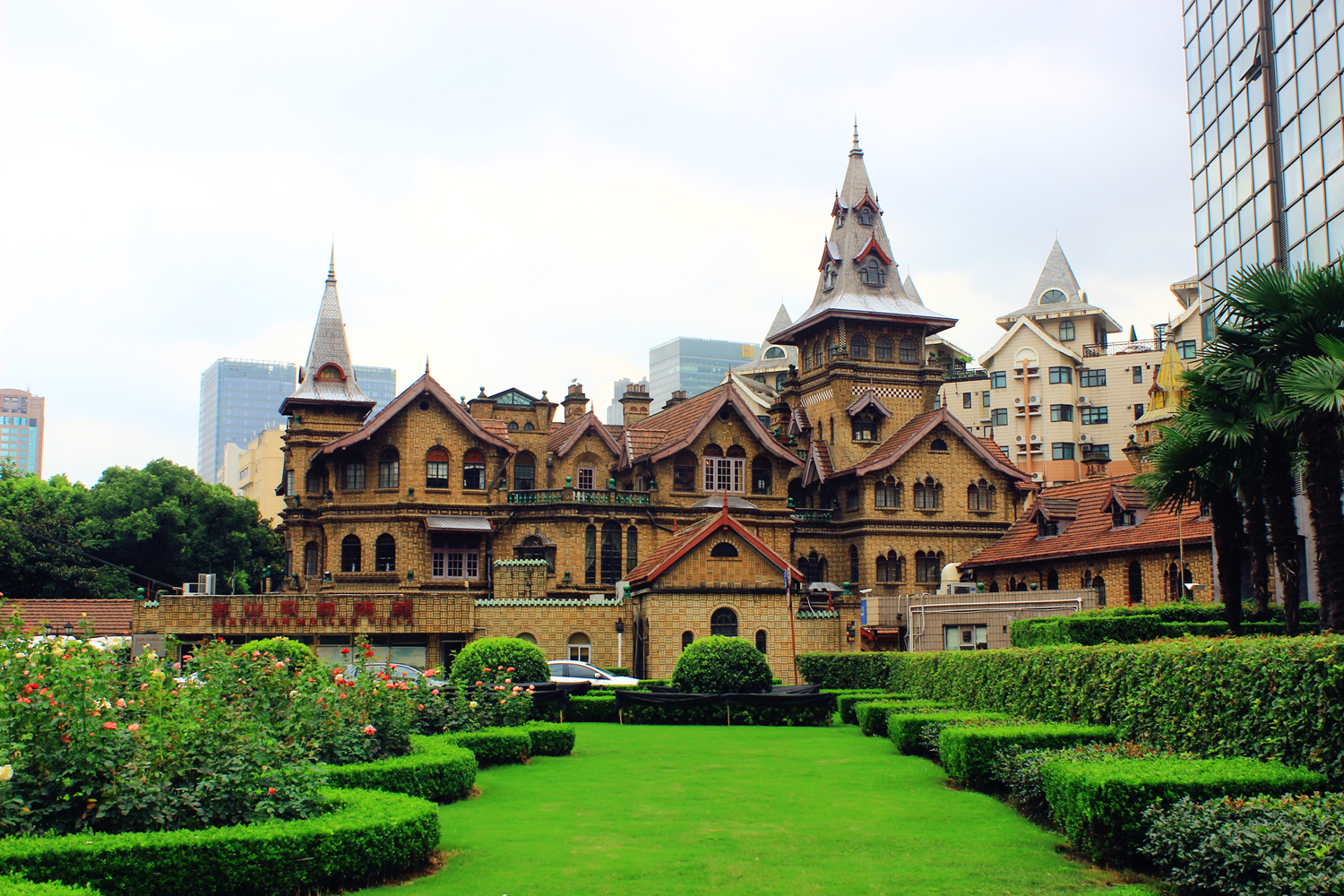
Front view of the mansion

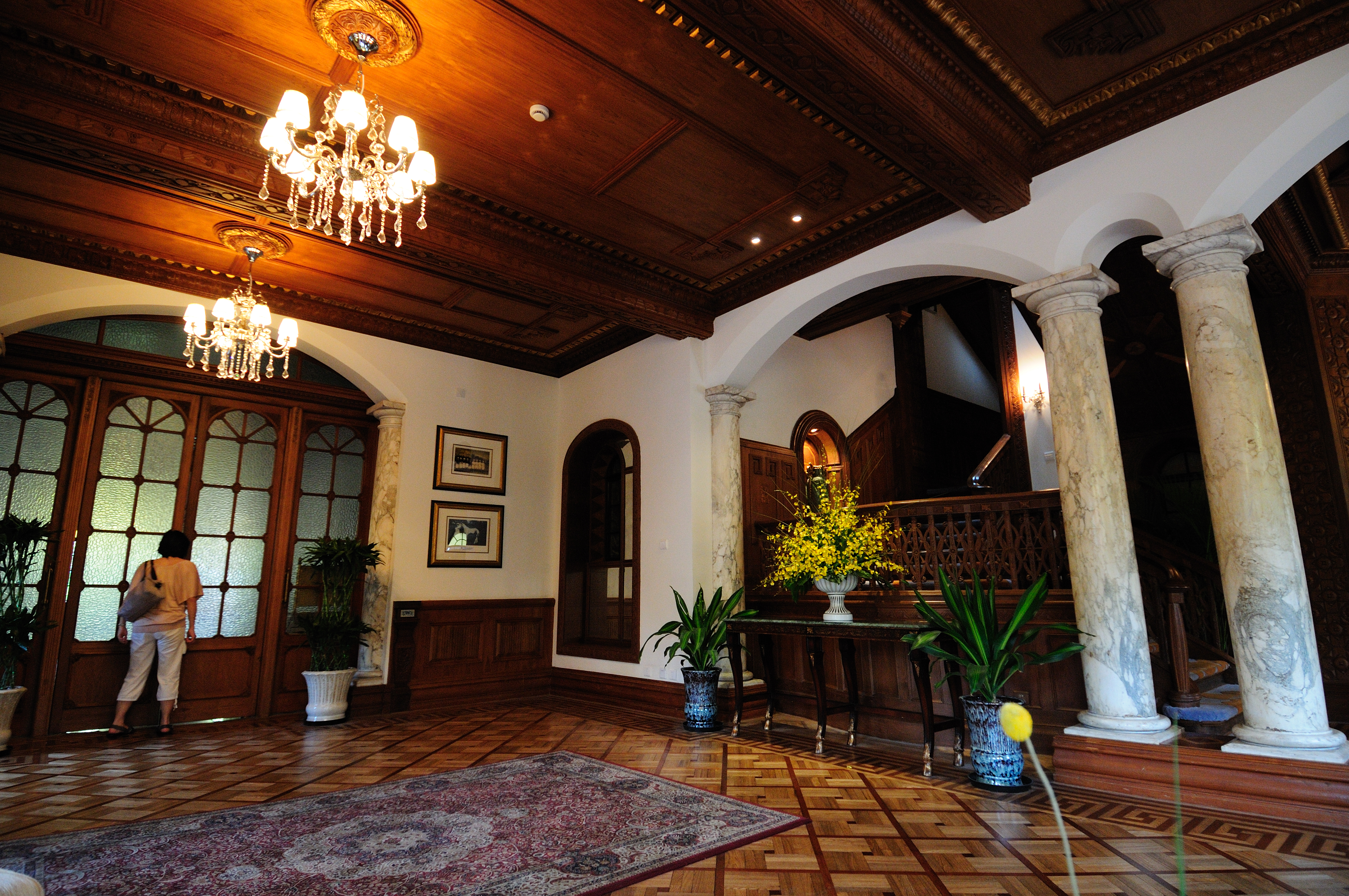
Internal view of the mansion.

The Moller Villa (Male zhuzhai, 马勒住宅), located at 30 South Shanxi Road in the French Concession area of Shanghai, China, is a colonial-era mansion. The villa was built by Eric Moller, a Swedish shipping magnate, in 1936. The distinctive design includes brown-tiled Gothic and Tudor gables, spires, and steeples.

In 2001, the Hengshan Group began to renovate to the villa, preserving its original architectural style. The building now houses a hotel.

== History ==
The design of the house is supposedly based on a sketch drawn by Moller's daughter from a dream that she had. The mansion is built in a distinctively Scandinavian style with some Chinese touches such as glazed tiles. Beyond the front gate with its two stone lions is a large lawn which encircles a tomb for Moller's favourite horse and other pets.

The mansion had been occupied by Japanese military and the Kuomintang in the past, later becoming the headquarters for the Communist Youth League Shanghai Branch.

== See also ==
- Former Residence of Sun Yat-sen, Shanghai
- Song Ching Ling Memorial Residence in Shanghai
- Major National Historical and Cultural Sites (Shanghai)
