= Former Residence of Zhou Enlai =

The Former Residence of Zhou Enlai can refer to any of the following places which Zhou Enlai, the Premier of the People's Republic of China had lived in, including the following:

- Former Residence of Zhou Enlai (Huai'an)
- Former Residence of Zhou Enlai (Shanghai)
