= Memorial to Zhou Enlai and Deng Yingchao =

Coordinates: 39°05′39″N 117°09′54″E

周恩来邓颖超纪念馆
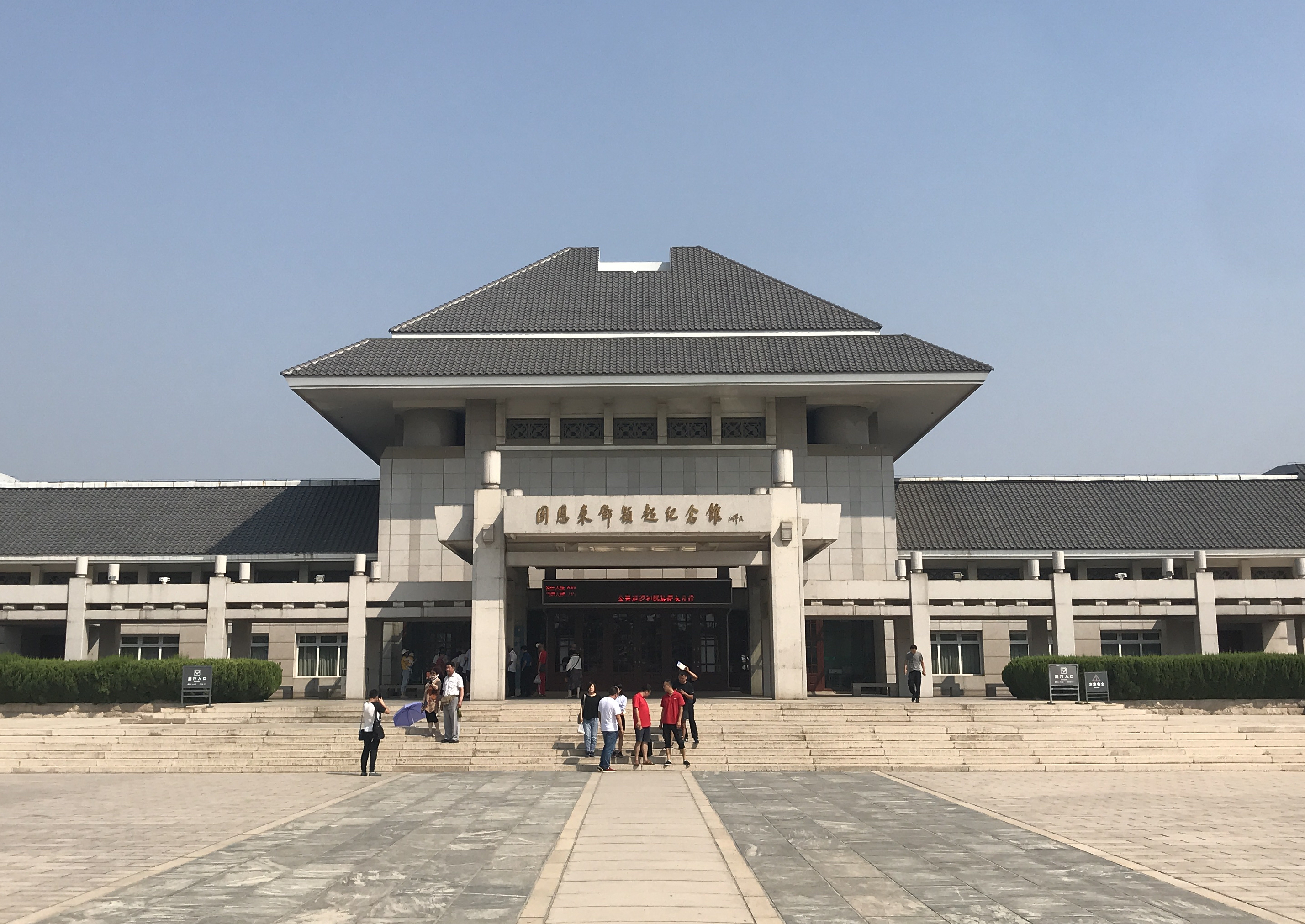
- Established: 1998
- Location: Nankai District, Tianjin
- Type: Memorial Museum
- Website: www.mzhoudeng.com

The Memorial to Zhou Enlai and Deng Yingchao is a museum in Tianjin. The three-story museum is dedicated to the memory of premier Zhou Enlai and his wife, Deng Yingchao, and features photos, documents and dioramas of significant events in their lives. Situated in the entrance-hall are the white jade sitting statues of Zhou Enlai and Deng Yingchao. In another exhibition hall there are over 140 artifacts recovered from Zhou Enlai and Deng Yingchao.

The museum is located near the Tianjin Water Park. In November 2017, it was honored as the Fifth National Civilized Unit. in December 2017, it was selected as one of the first batch of national study and practice education bases and camps for primary and middle school students by the Ministry of Education.

== Exhibition ==
The basic display in the museum is divided into four major exhibition areas, namely, the main exhibition hall, the West Flower Hall of Zhongnanhai in Beijing, Premier Zhou Enlai's Specialized Aircraft Exhibition Area and the "New Haimen" Ship Exhibition Area.

- The first floor of the main exhibition hall is the exhibition of "People's Premier Zhou Enlai", and the third floor is the exhibition of "Deng Yingchao, the Outstanding Representative of Chinese Women in the 20th Century";
- The Xihuahua Hall exhibition area is equipped with restored displays and themed cultural relics exhibition "Great Sentiment";
- The exhibition area of Premier Zhou Enlai's special airplane displays the Ilyushin Il-14 aircraft No. 678 which was gifted to Zhou Enlai by the Government of the Soviet Union;
- The exhibition area of the ship "New Haimen" displays the ship "New Haimen" which undertook the task of scattering Deng Yingchao's ashes in 1992. The "New Haimen" ship exhibition area displays the "New Haimen" ship which undertook the task of scattering Deng Yingchao's ashes in 1992.

== See also ==
- List of tourist attractions in China
- Mausoleum of Mao Zedong
- Shaoshan Mao Zedong's Former Residence and Memorial Museum
- Mausoleum of Hua Guofeng
- Zhu De's Former Residence
- Zhou Enlai Memorial Hall in Huaian
- Deng Xiaoping's Former Residence and Memorial Hall in Guangan
