= Former Residence of Zhou Enlai (Shanghai) =

Building in Shanghai, China

Coordinates: 31.214186°N 121.4685365°E

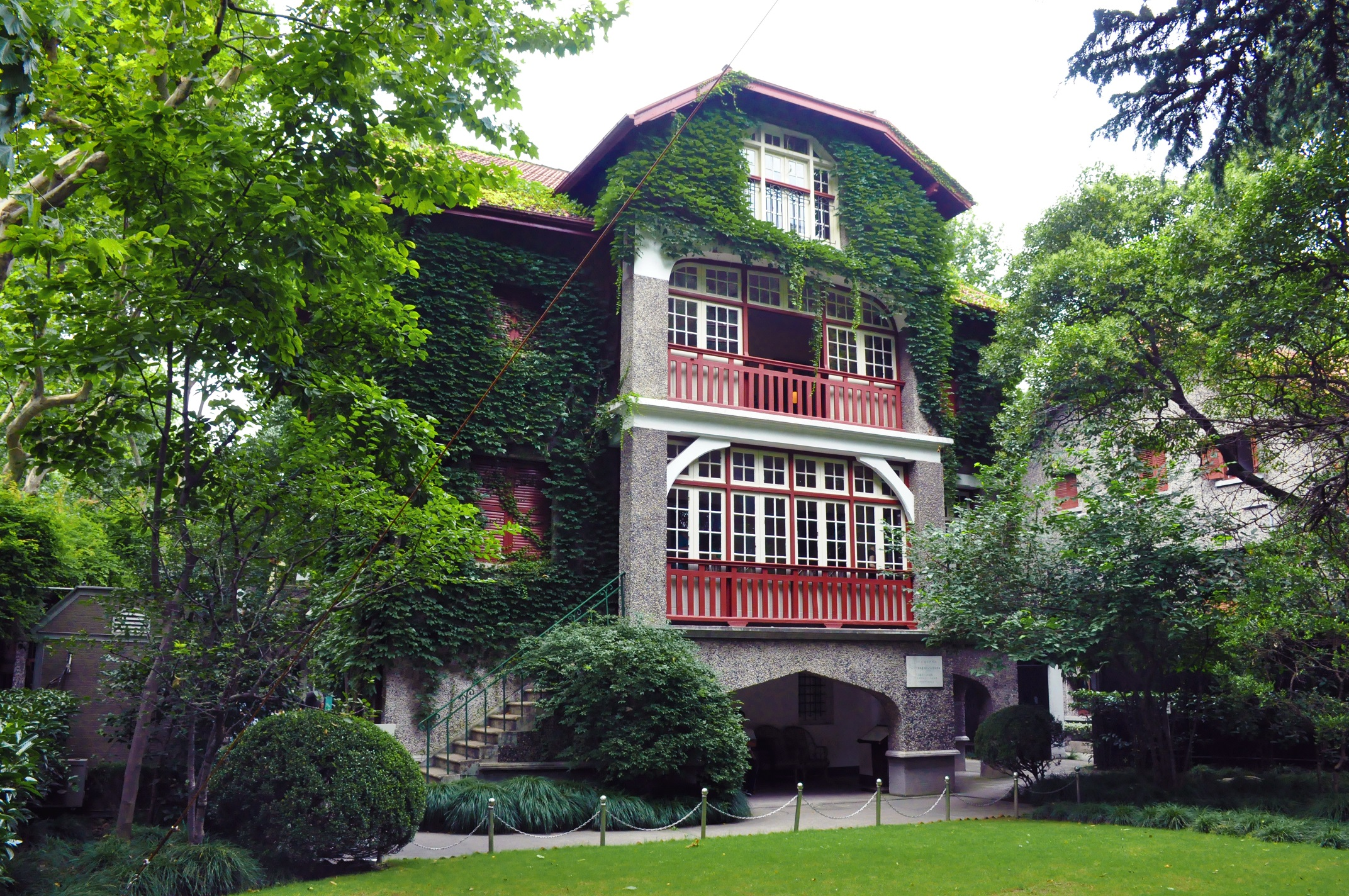
Former Residence of Zhou Enlai in Shanghai

The Former Residence of Zhou Enlai in Shanghai (Chinese: 上海周恩来故居), or Zhougongguan (周公馆) located at 73 (formerly 107) Sinan Road, Huangpu District, in the former French Concession area of Shanghai, China, near Fuxing Park to the northeast, was the residence of Zhou Enlai (1898–1976), the first Premier of the People's Republic of China from 1949 until his death.

The three-storey house was built in the 1920s in a French style. Zhou Enlai stayed in the house during 1946. It was the Shanghai Office of the Delegates of the Chinese Communist Party in 1946–7. The house was listed as a municipal relic in 1959 and became a memorial in 1979. The house is open daily, 9 am–4:30 pm, free of charge.

== See also ==
- Former Residence of Zhou Enlai (Huai'an)
- Former Residence of Sun Yat-Sen (Shanghai)
- Song Ching Ling Memorial Residence in Shanghai
- Major National Historical and Cultural Sites (Shanghai)
