= Zhenru Temple =

Zhenru Temple (Chinese: 真如寺; pinyin: Zhēnrú Sì) may refer to:

- Zhenru Temple (Jiangxi), in Yongxiu County of Jiujaing, Jiangxi, China
- Zhenru Temple (Jiangsu), in Gaochun District of Nanjing, Jiangsu, China
- Zhenru Temple (Fujian), in Xiapu County of Ningde, Fujian, China
- Zhenru Temple (Shanghai), in Putuo District, Shanghai, China
