= Former Residence of Sun Yat-sen =

The Former Residence of Sun Yat-sen can refer to any of the following places which the Chinese revolutionary Dr. Sun Yat-sen had lived in:

- Former Residence of Sun Yat-Sen (Shanghai)
- Sun Yat Sen Memorial House in Macau
- Former Residence of Sun Yat-sen (Cuiheng)
