= Yilong County =

Yilong County 仪陇县
- County
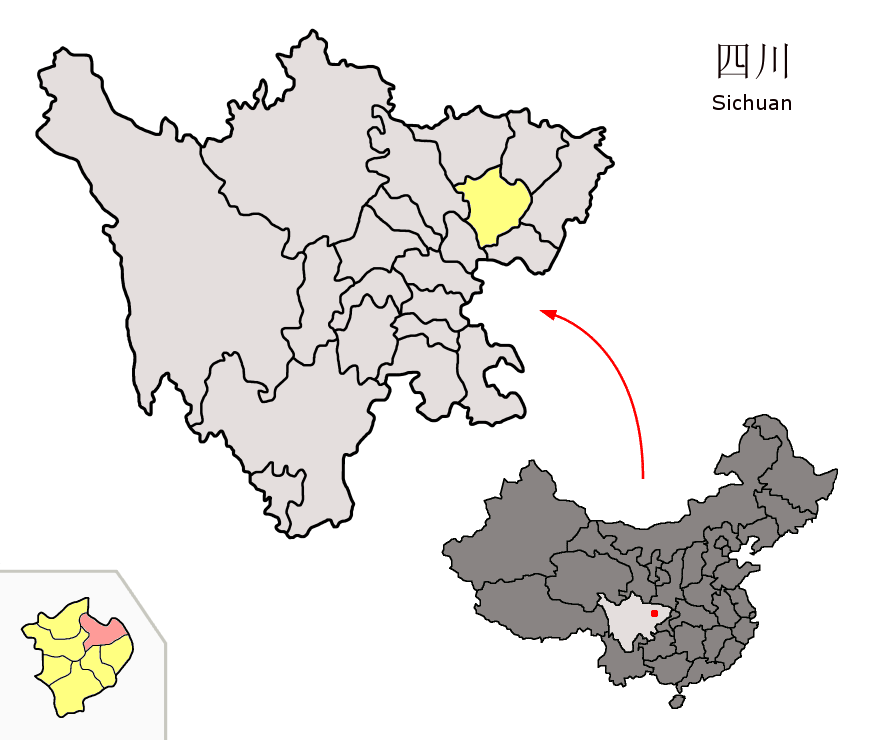
- Location of Yilong County (red) within Nanchong City (yellow) and Sichuan
- Coordinates: 31°16′19″N 106°18′11″E
- Country: China
- Province: Sichuan
- Prefecture-level city: Nanchong
- County seat: Xinzheng

Area
  - Total: 1,767 km^{2} (682 sq mi)

Population (2020 census)
  - Total: 729,141
  - Density: 412.6/km^{2} (1,069/sq mi)
- Time zone: UTC+8 (China Standard)

Yilong (simplified Chinese: 仪陇县; traditional Chinese: 儀隴縣; pinyin: Yílǒng Xiàn) is a county in the northeast of Sichuan, China. It is under the administration of the prefecture-level city of Nanchong. Zhu De's Former Residence is located here. Zhu De was a marshal and one of the principal founders of the Chinese Communist Party.

== Traffic ==
- Tabfba road: across Jincheng (金城) and Tumen (土门)
- Yibei road: starts in Jincheng town (金城镇) and passes through Sanjiao town (三蛟镇) and other places in Yilong county
- Xinma road: across Xinzhen (新政) and Ma'an (马鞍)
- The Bazhong–Nanchong Expressway

== Geography ==
Yilong is located in northeastern Sichuan and is in the transition zone of Yilong low mountains and hilly, mainly of it is hilly. It has many rivers, such as the Jialing River, a major Yangtze tributary.

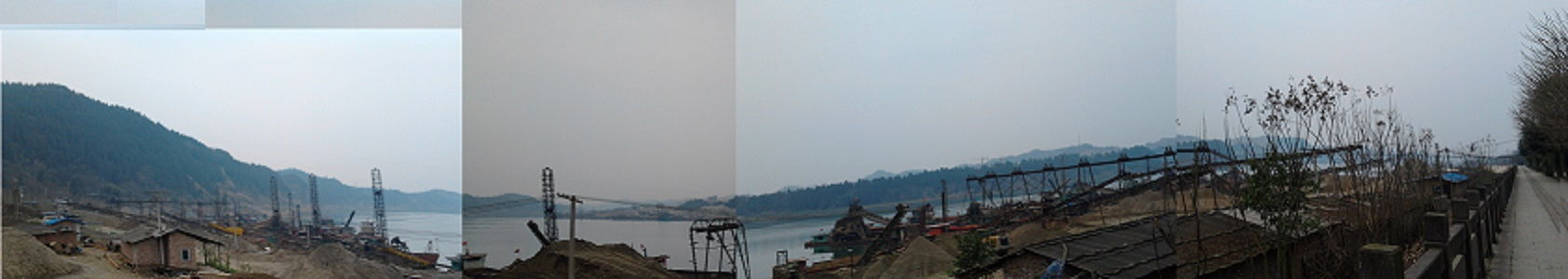
Jialing River view in Yinong

== Administrative divisions ==
Yilong county has 1 subdistrict, 29 towns and 7 townships:

Subdistricts

- Dumen 度门街道

Towns

- Jincheng 金城镇
- Xinzheng 新政镇
- Ma'an 马鞍镇
- Yongle 永乐镇
- Rixing 日兴镇
- Tumen 土门镇
- Fuxing 复兴镇
- Guanzi 观紫镇
- Xianfeng 先锋镇
- Sanjiao 三蛟镇
- Huichun 回春镇
- Liuya 柳垭镇
- Yilu 义路镇
- Lishan 立山镇
- Sanhe 三河镇
- Wazi 瓦子镇
- Dayin 大寅镇
- Erdao 二道镇
- Saijin 赛金镇
- Dingziqiao 丁字桥镇
- Dayi 大仪镇
- Zhanggong 张公镇
- Wufu 五福镇
- Yangqiao 杨桥镇
- Baoping 保平镇
- Wenxing 文星镇
- Shuangsheng 双胜镇
- Yongguang 永光镇
- Side 思德镇

Townships

- Tonggu 铜鼓乡
- Fengyi 凤仪乡
- Fulin 福临乡
- Laiyi 来仪乡
- Banqiao 板桥乡
- Bajiao 芭蕉乡
- Chaijing 柴井乡

July 8, 2003 by the State Council, the People's Government of the resident Yilong County town of Jincheng moved to the town of Xinzheng, September 29, 2005, officially moved to the town of Xinzheng.

== See also ==
- Zhu De's Former Residence

== Notable people ==
- Zhu De
- Zhang Side

== Climate ==
Climate data for Jincheng Town, Yilong, elevation 656 m (2,152 ft), 1991–2020 normals, extremes 1959–present)
Month	Jan	Feb	Mar	Apr	May	Jun	Jul	Aug	Sep	Oct	Nov	Dec	Year
Record high °C (°F)	18.1 (64.6)	21.0 (69.8)	30.8 (87.4)	31.9 (89.4)	34.6 (94.3)	34.6 (94.3)	37.5 (99.5)	39.3 (102.7)	37.6 (99.7)	29.8 (85.6)	23.7 (74.7)	15.7 (60.3)	39.3 (102.7)
Mean daily maximum °C (°F)	7.6 (45.7)	10.5 (50.9)	15.5 (59.9)	21.2 (70.2)	24.9 (76.8)	27.3 (81.1)	30.0 (86.0)	30.3 (86.5)	24.9 (76.8)	19.3 (66.7)	14.3 (57.7)	8.7 (47.7)	19.5 (67.2)
Daily mean °C (°F)	5.1 (41.2)	7.6 (45.7)	11.8 (53.2)	16.9 (62.4)	20.5 (68.9)	23.4 (74.1)	26.0 (78.8)	25.9 (78.6)	21.3 (70.3)	16.3 (61.3)	11.6 (52.9)	6.4 (43.5)	16.1 (60.9)
Mean daily minimum °C (°F)	3.4 (38.1)	5.5 (41.9)	9.2 (48.6)	13.7 (56.7)	17.3 (63.1)	20.4 (68.7)	23.0 (73.4)	22.8 (73.0)	18.9 (66.0)	14.2 (57.6)	9.7 (49.5)	4.7 (40.5)	13.6 (56.4)
Record low °C (°F)	−3.0 (26.6)	−1.7 (28.9)	−1.5 (29.3)	3.7 (38.7)	8.0 (46.4)	11.9 (53.4)	16.6 (61.9)	14.6 (58.3)	10.5 (50.9)	1.0 (33.8)	0.1 (32.2)	−4.5 (23.9)	−4.5 (23.9)
Average precipitation mm (inches)	12.9 (0.51)	17.4 (0.69)	32.6 (1.28)	65.9 (2.59)	126.0 (4.96)	165.7 (6.52)	194.8 (7.67)	157.4 (6.20)	162.2 (6.39)	88.5 (3.48)	39.6 (1.56)	15.5 (0.61)	1,078.5 (42.46)
Average precipitation days (≥ 0.1 mm)	8.2	8.1	10.0	11.4	13.0	13.9	13.8	11.3	13.4	14.0	9.8	8.3	135.2
Average snowy days	2.6	1.0	0.2	0	0	0	0	0	0	0	0.1	0.7	4.6
Average relative humidity (%)	77	74	70	70	72	78	79	74	80	82	79	80	76
Mean monthly sunshine hours	66.4	64.8	104.7	147.4	156.2	143.5	185.3	193.4	109.6	84.0	74.5	57.3	1,387.1
Percentage possible sunshine	21	21	28	38	37	34	43	48	30	24	24	18	31
Source: China Meteorological Administrationall-time extreme temperatureall-time July high
