= Memorial hall =

Hall built to commemorate an individual or group

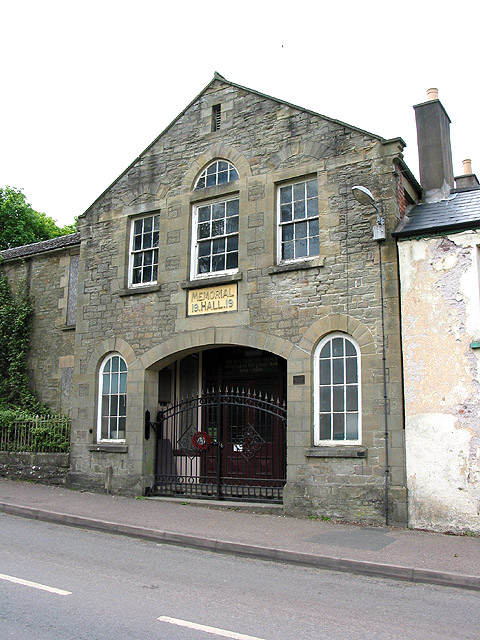
Parkend Memorial Hall, in the village of Parkend, England. A typical village memorial hall, erected in 1919 as a memorial to villagers who died while serving in the First World War.

A memorial hall is a hall built to commemorate an individual or group; most commonly those who have died in war. Most are intended for public use and are sometimes described as utilitarian memorials.

== History of memorial halls ==
In the aftermath of the First World War, many towns and villages looked to commemorate casualties from their communities. Community leaders were expected to organise local committees to construct memorials and halls, for the benefit of the local community, which were often seen as appropriate ways in which to honour those who had lost their lives. Most incorporate a plaque or stone, individually naming casualties, although, in some cases, they were built instead of war memorials. Most First World War memorial halls would later go on to be rededicated as memorials to those who also died in the Second World War. In post-war times, many Second World War memorials would later be rededicated to those who lost their lives in numerous modern wars.

== Village hall ==
Memorial halls often serve the functions of village halls.
