= Zhenru Temple (Shanghai) =

Buddhist temple in Shanghai, China

- 真如寺
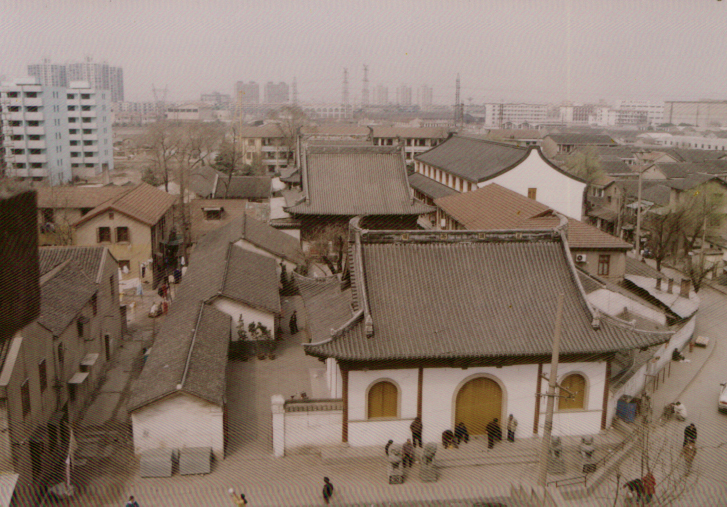
- Zhenru Temple

- Location within Shanghai Location within China

Religion
- Affiliation: Buddhism
- Deity: Chan Buddhism
- Leadership: Miaoling (妙灵)

Location
- Location: Putuo District, Shanghai
- Country: China
- Interactive map of Zhenru Temple
- Coordinates: 31°15′20″N 121°24′29″E

Architecture
- Style: Chinese architecture
- Established: Song dynasty (960–1276)
- Completed: 1320 (reconstruction)

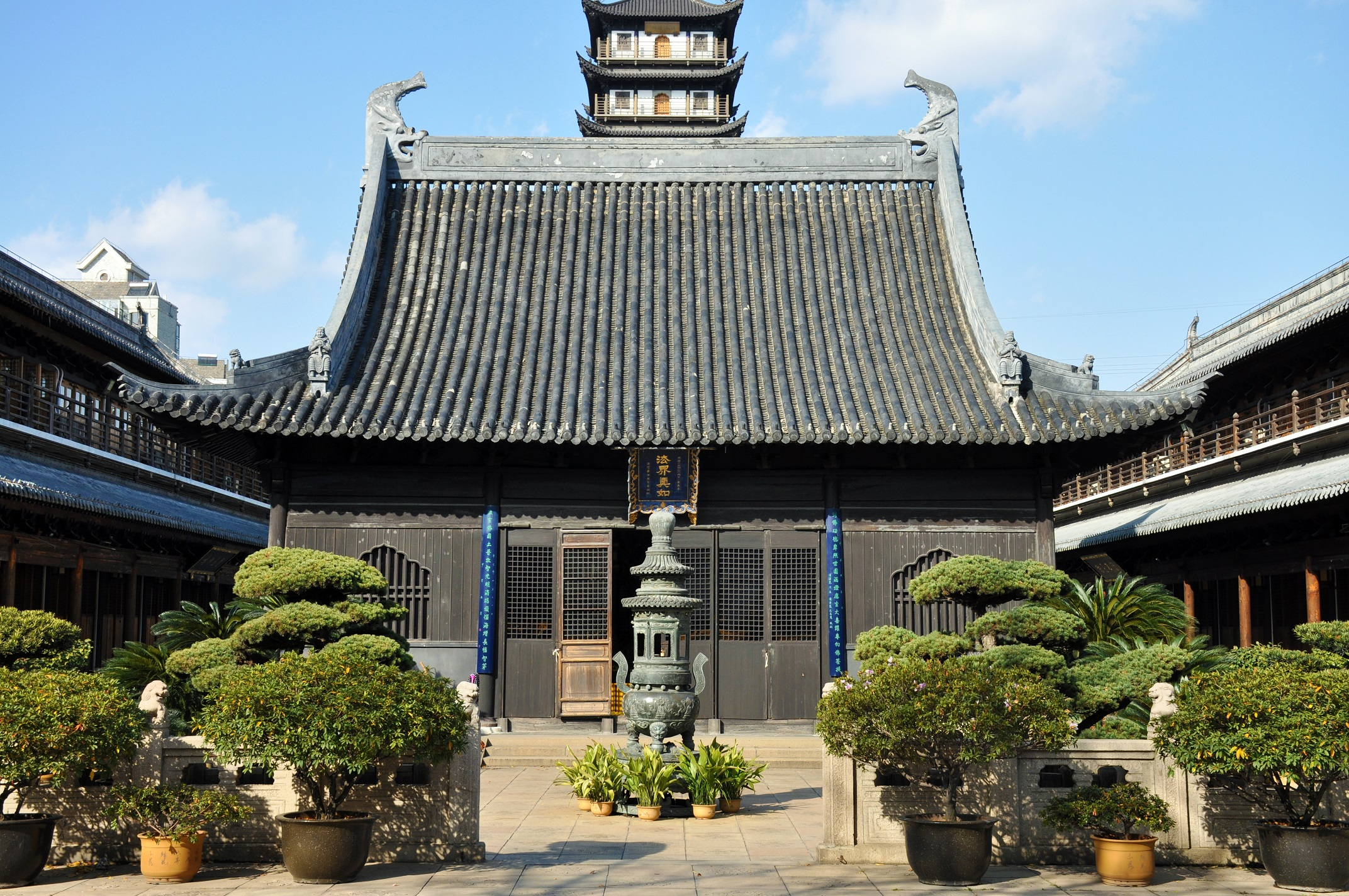
The Mahavira Hall at Zhenru Temple

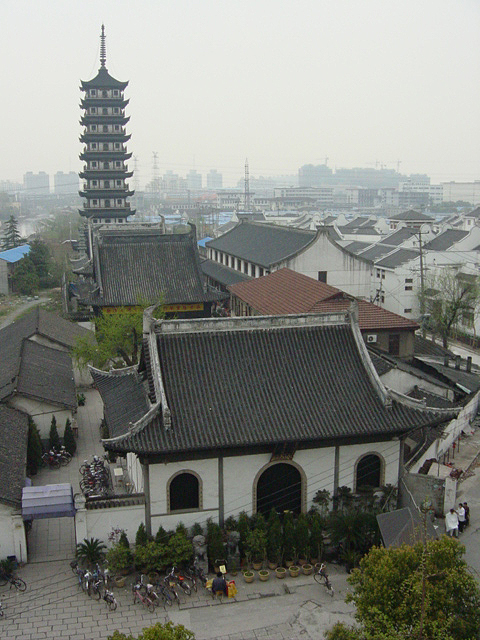
An aerial view of Zhenru Temple

Zhenru Temple (Chinese: 真如寺; pinyin: Zhēnrú Sì) is a Buddhist temple located in Putuo District of Shanghai, China. It is a Major National Historical and Cultural Site in Shanghai.

== Name ==
The name "Zhenru" (真如) means "thusness" or "reality as it is" in Chinese, and comes from the Buddhist sutra Vijnaptimatratasiddhi-sastra or Cheng Wei-Shih Lun (成唯识论) in Chinese.

== History ==
=== Song dynasty ===
In its first iteration, built in the Song dynasty (960–1276) it was called "Zhenru Yuan" (真如院) originally, and changed to "Zhenru Si" (真如寺) by monk Yong'an (永安) in the Jiading era (1208–1224) of the Southern Song dynasty (1127–1276).

=== Yuan dynasty ===
In 1320, during the reign of Ayurbarwada Buyantu Khan in the Mongolian ruling Yuan dynasty (1271–1368), monk Miaoxin (妙心) moved the temple to the present site.

=== Ming dynasty ===
Zhenru Temple has been repaired two times in the Ming dynasty (1368–1644), one in the Hongwu period (1368–1398) and the other in the Hongzhi period (1488–1505).

=== Qing dynasty ===
In 1860, in the reign of Xianfeng Emperor (1851–1861) of the Qing dynasty (1644–1911), the temple was devastated by the Taiping Rebellion.

=== People's Republic of China ===
In May 1959, it was authorized as a municipal cultural heritage building.

In 1966, Mao Zedong launched the Cultural Revolution. Statues and other works of art were either removed, damaged or destroyed by the Red Guards, including a Ming dynasty gilded copper statue of Maitreya and a Qing dynasty carved wood statue of Sakyamuni.

In 1979, the Shanghai Municipal Government refurbished and redecorated the temple, and used it as an ancient architecture exhibition hall.

In 1991, regular scripture lectures, meditation and other features of temple life were resumed.

In January 1992, Singaporean Buddhist monk Xingren (性仁) presented three jade statues of the Buddha and some Buddhist sutras to the temple.

On November 20, 1996, it has been designated as a "Major National Historical and Cultural Site in Shanghai" by the State Council of China.

== Architecture ==
The existing main buildings include the Shanmen, Four Heavenly Kings Hall, Mahavira Hall and Guanyin Hall.

=== Mahavira Hall ===
The Mahavira Hall was built in 1320 during the Yuan dynasty (1271–1368). The hall is 13.4 metres (44 ft) wide and 13 metres (43 ft) deep with 16 wood pillars supporting the single eave gable and hip roof (单檐歇山顶). A 2.18-metre-high (7 ft 2 in) and 2,500-kilogram (5,500 lb) jade statue of Sakyamuni sits in the center of the hall.
