= Fuxing Park =

Park in Shanghai, China

Coordinates: 31.21899°N 121.464163°E

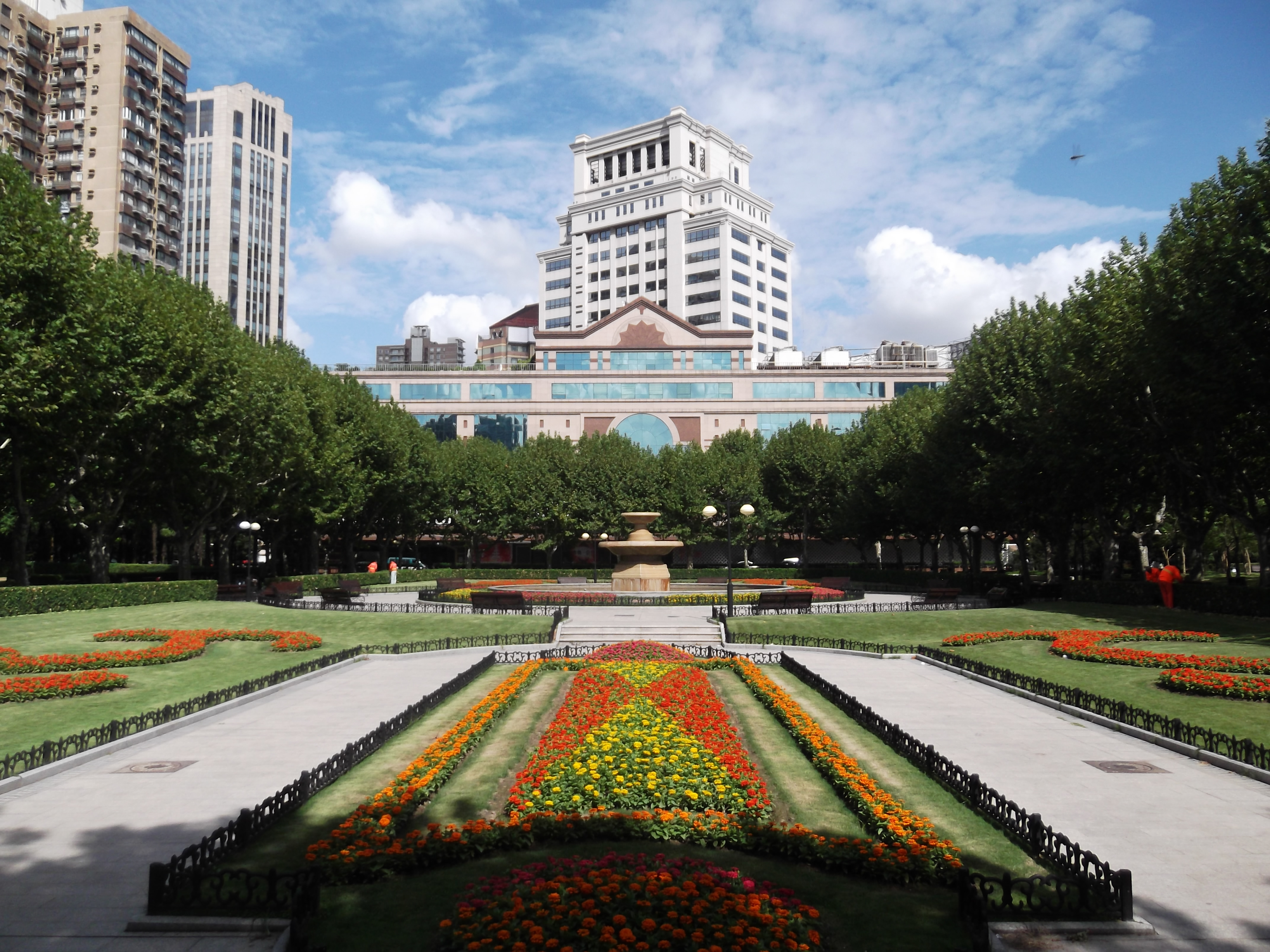
- Interactive map of Fuxing Park
- Type: Garden
- Location: Shanghai, Luwan District, China
- Open: 1909

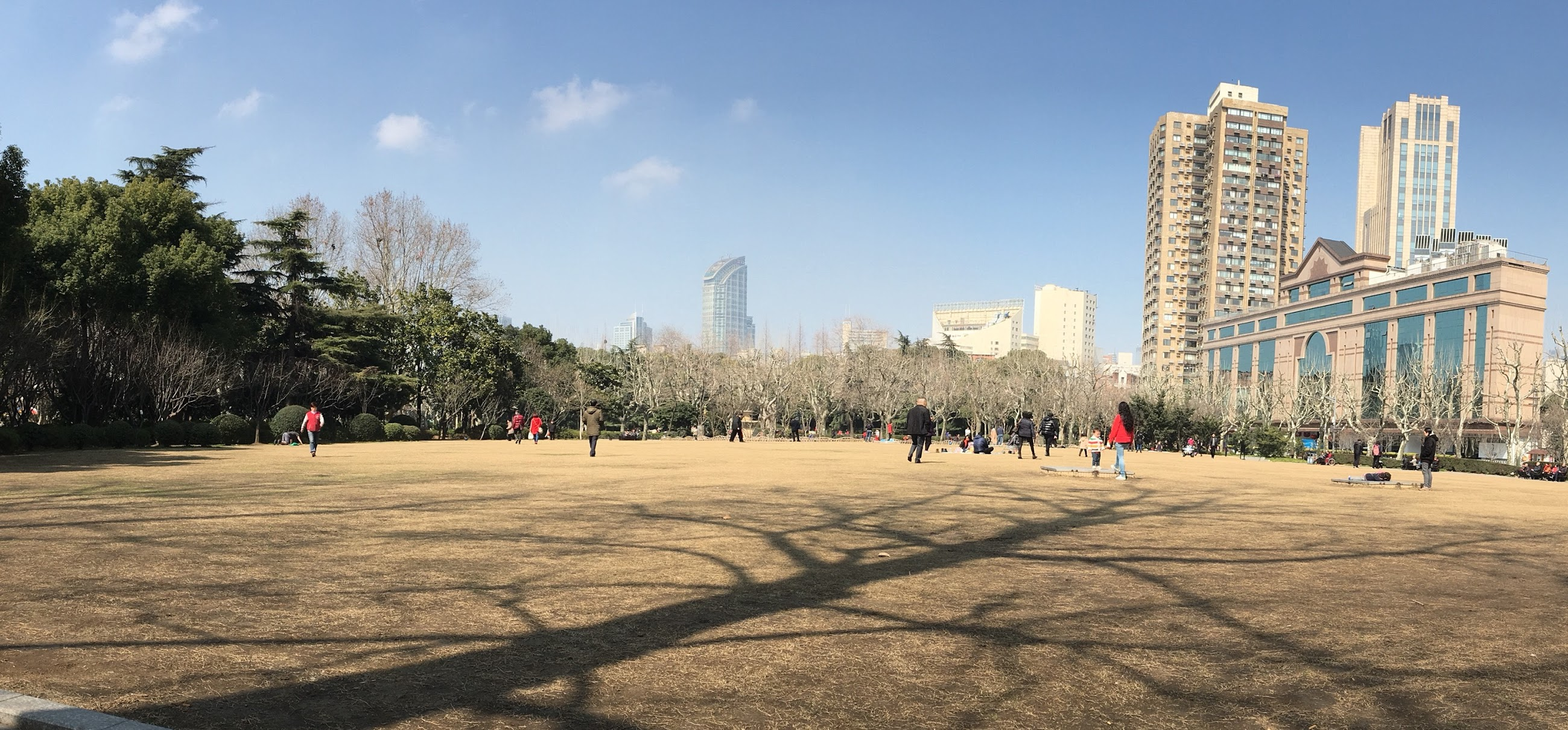
Clearing in the park

Fuxing Park (simplified Chinese: 复兴公园; traditional Chinese: 復興公園; pinyin: Fùxīng gōngyuán) is located in the former French Concession of Shanghai, China, in Luwan District near Nanchang Road; the main entrance is at the cross street of Fuxingzhong Road and Chongqingnan Road. It was once the largest park in Shanghai. The park was laid out by the French in 1909. The park, about 10 ha. in size, is designed in the French style, with a lake, fountains, covered pavilions, and flowerbeds. Early morning, the park fills with dancers, card players, mahjong enthusiasts, and tai chi solo and group artists. According to Time magazine's Hannah Beech, it is one of the must-see sights in Shanghai.

The park was originally named Gu's Park, but during the French occupation it became a military encampment. After the French, the Japanese renamed the park "Daxing Park." Finally, in the mid 20th century, the Chinese regained control of the park land and dubbed it "Fuxing Park." The park was fully rehabilitated in 2008, in time for its 100th anniversary. Design was executed by WAA International Ltd, a Canadian WOFE created in Shanghai in 2004 under the leadership of Vincent Asselin C.Q., CSLA Fellow and Shanghai Silver Magnolia Medal awardee.

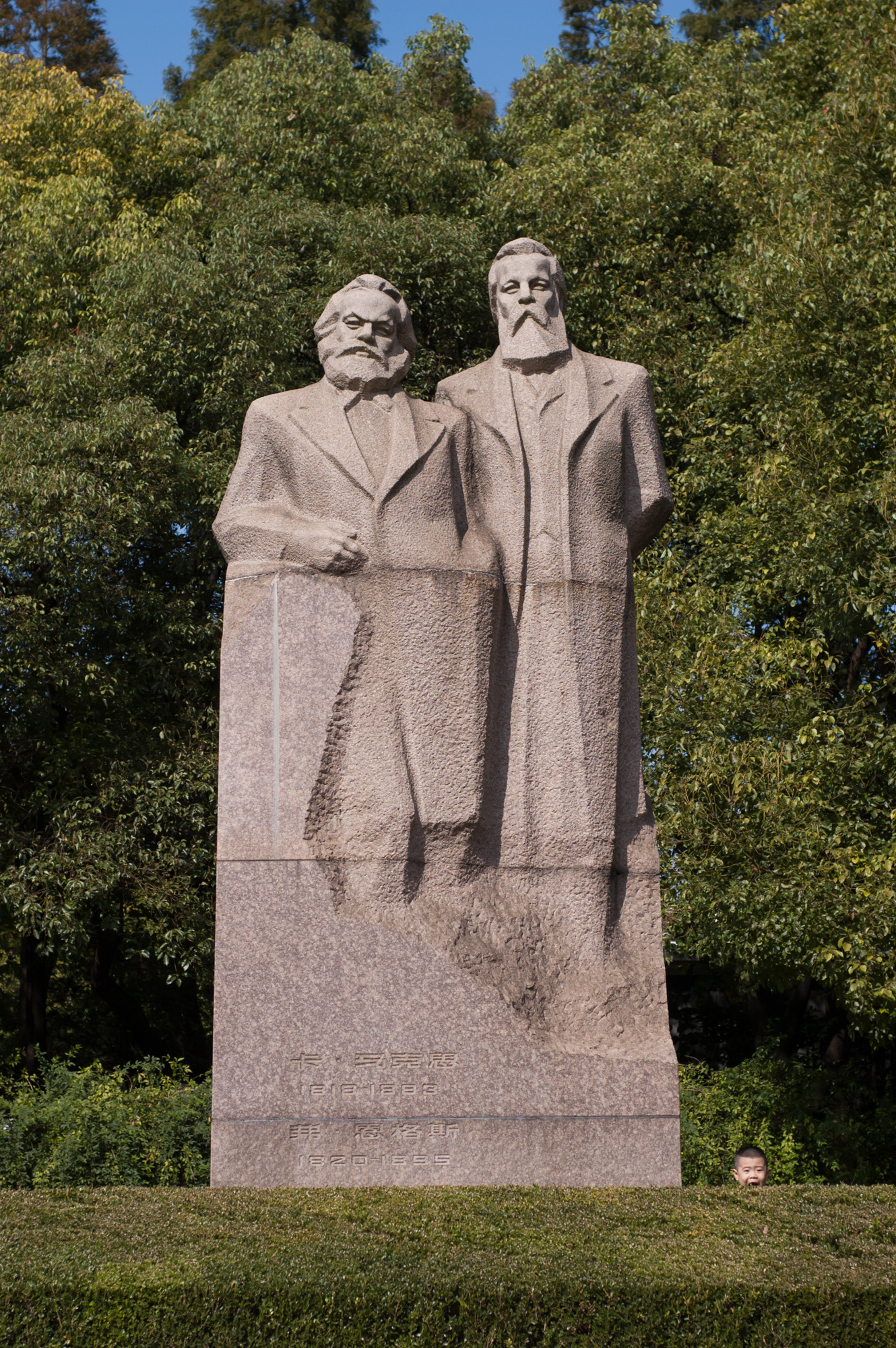
Statue of Marx and Engels

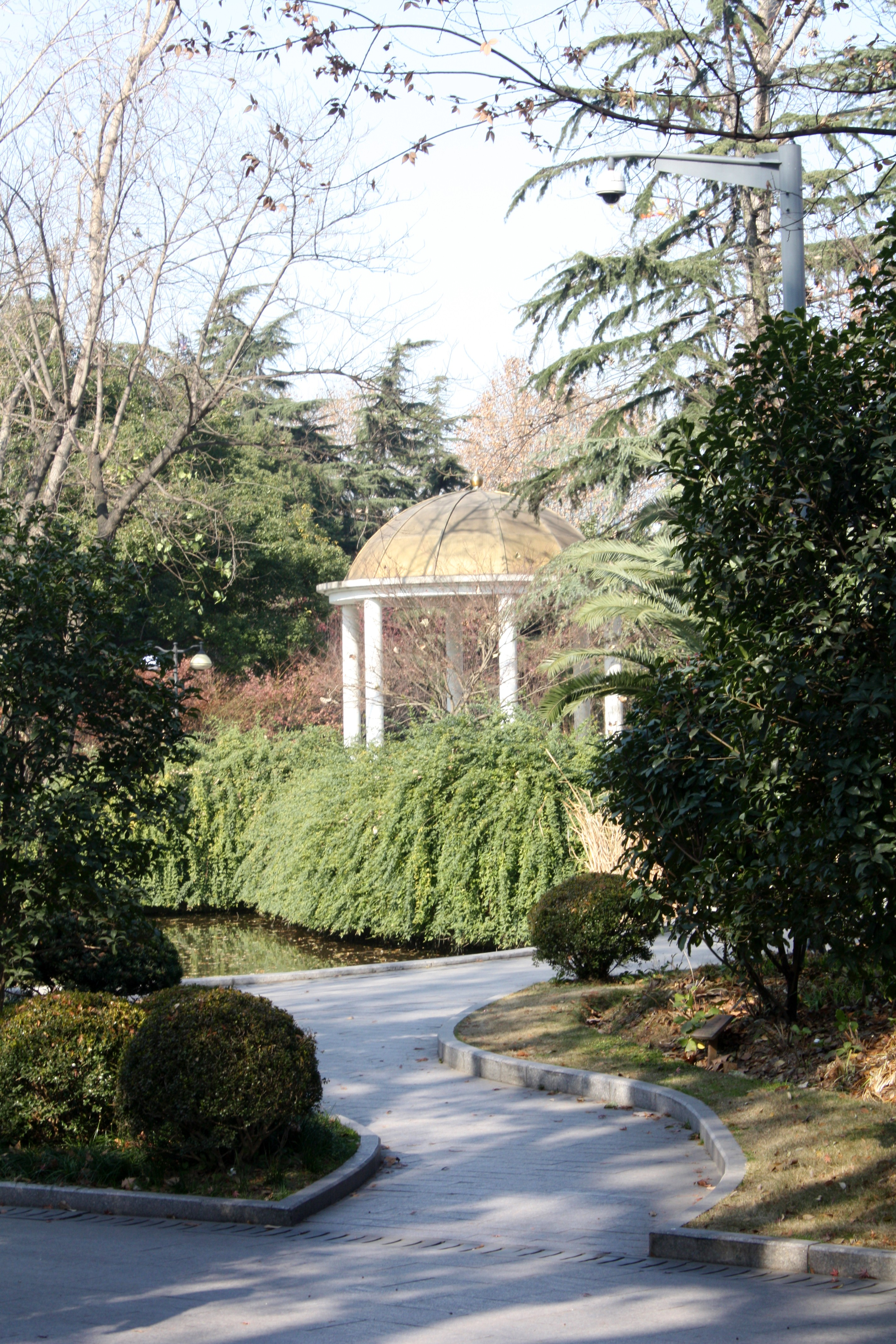
Pathway in the park

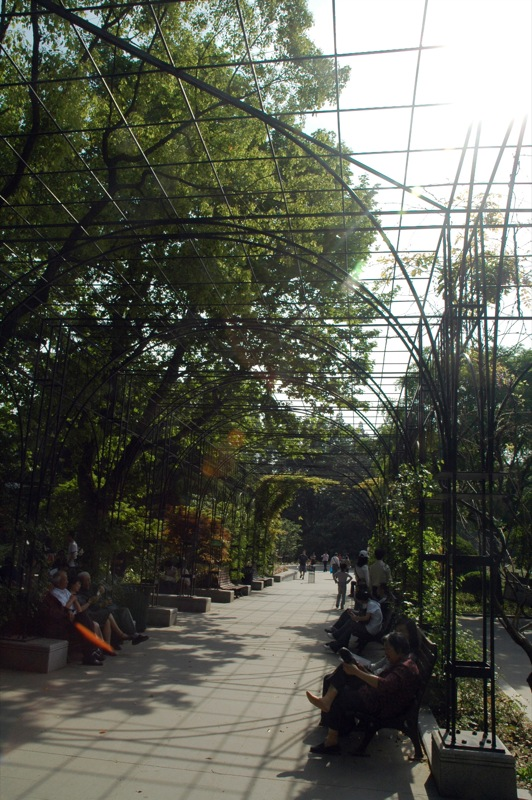
Covered alley

== See also ==
- Former Residence of Sun Yat-sen to the west
- List of statues of Karl Marx
