= List of Major National Historical and Cultural Sites in Shanghai =

This list is of major cultural heritage site under national-level protection in the Municipality of Shanghai, People's Republic of China.

Site	Date	Location	Image	Coordinates	Designation
Former Residence of Sun Yat-sen 上海中山故居	1919	Huangpu District	Upload file	31°12′58″N 121°28′03″E	1-9
Site of the Socialist Youth League of China 中国社会主义青年团中央机关旧址	1920-21	Huangpu District	Upload file	31°13′13″N 121°28′06″E	1-10
Site of the First National Congress of the Chinese Communist Party 中国共产党第一次全国代表大会会址	1921	Huangpu District	Upload file	31°13′13″N 121°28′32″E	1-11
Tomb of Lu Xun 鲁迅墓	1956	Hongkou District	Upload file	31°16′18″N 121°28′57″E	1-31
Tomb of Soong Ching-ling 宋庆龄墓	1981	Changning District	Upload file	31°11′42″N 121°24′48″E	2-10
Yu Garden 豫园	Ming, Qing	Huangpu District	Upload file	31°13′38″N 121°29′32″E	2-39
Longhua Revolutionary Martyrs Memorial 龙华革命烈士纪念地	1927-37	Xuhui District	Upload file	31°10′39″N 121°27′08″E	3-25
Sutra Pillar of the Tang Dynasty in Songjiang 松江唐经幢	Tang	Songjiang District	Upload file	31°00′07″N 121°14′13″E	3-179
Tomb of Xu Guangqi 徐光启墓	Ming	Xuhui District	Upload file	31°11′21″N 121°26′05″E	3-254
Xingshengjiao Temple Pagoda 兴圣教寺塔	Northern Song	Songjiang District	Upload file	31°00′23″N 121°14′30″E	4-83
Main Hall of Zhenru Temple 真如寺大殿	Yuan	Putuo District	Upload file	31°14′57″N 121°24′05″E	4-120
Architecture of the Bund 上海外滩建筑群	1906-37	Huangpu District	Upload file	31°14′25″N 121°29′27″E	4-220
Shanghai General Post Office 上海邮政总局	1924	Hongkou District	Upload file	31°14′40″N 121°29′05″E	4-226
Fuquanshan Site 福泉山遗址	Neolithic	Qingpu District	Upload file	31°12′02″N 121°10′38″E	5-37
Shanghai Residence of Soong Ching-ling 上海宋庆龄故居	1948-81	Xuhui District	Upload file	31°12′14″N 121°26′20″E	5-482
Residence of Zhang Wentian 张闻天故居	Modern	Pudong New Area	Upload file	31°07′54″N 121°45′47″E	5-483
Longhua Pagoda 龙华塔	Song	Xuhui District	Upload file	31°10′21″N 121°27′05″E	6-505
Moller Villa 马勒住宅	Republic of China	Jing'an District	Upload file	31°13′22″N 121°27′23″E	6-926
Park Hotel Shanghai 国际饭店	Republic of China	Huangpu District	Upload file	31°14′00″N 121°28′18″E	6-927
Songze Site 崧泽遗址	Neolithic	Qingpu District	Upload file	31°08′20″N 121°10′04″E	7-134
Maqiao Site 上海马桥遗址	Neolithic	Minhang District	Upload file	31°02′07″N 121°22′58″E	7-135
Guangfulin Site 广富林遗址	Neolithic, Eastern Zhou	Songjiang District	Upload file	31°03′51″N 121°11′46″E	7-136
Shanghai Yuan Dynasty Water Gate Museum 上海元代水闸遗址博物馆	Yuan	Putuo District	Upload file	31°15′35″N 121°25′50″E	7-137
Jiading Confucius Temple 嘉定孔庙	Ming, Qing	Jiading District	Upload file	31°22′53″N 121°15′10″E	7-945
Yangshupu Waterworks 杨树浦水厂	1883	Yangpu District	Upload file	31°15′09″N 121°31′37″E	7-1694
Sheshan Observatory 佘山天文台	1900	Songjiang District	Upload file	31°05′48″N 121°11′24″E	7-1695
Early Tilanqiao Prison Buildings 提篮桥监狱早期建筑	1903	Hongkou District	Upload file	31°15′20″N 121°30′37″E	7-1696
St. Ignatius Cathedral 徐家汇天主堂	1910	Xuhui District	Upload file	31°11′28″N 121°26′10″E	7-1697
Site of the Second Congress of the Chinese Communist Party 中国共产党第二次全国代表大会会址	1922	Huangpu District	Upload file	31°13′27″N 121°28′00″E	7-1698

As well as sites protected at the national level there are 238 sites in Shanghai that are protected at the municipal level (see 上海市文物保护单位).

== See also ==
- Principles for the Conservation of Heritage Sites in China
- List of historic buildings in Shanghai
