= Soong Ching-ling Memorial Residence (Shanghai) =

Building in Xuhui District, China

Coordinates: 31.203°N 121.439°E

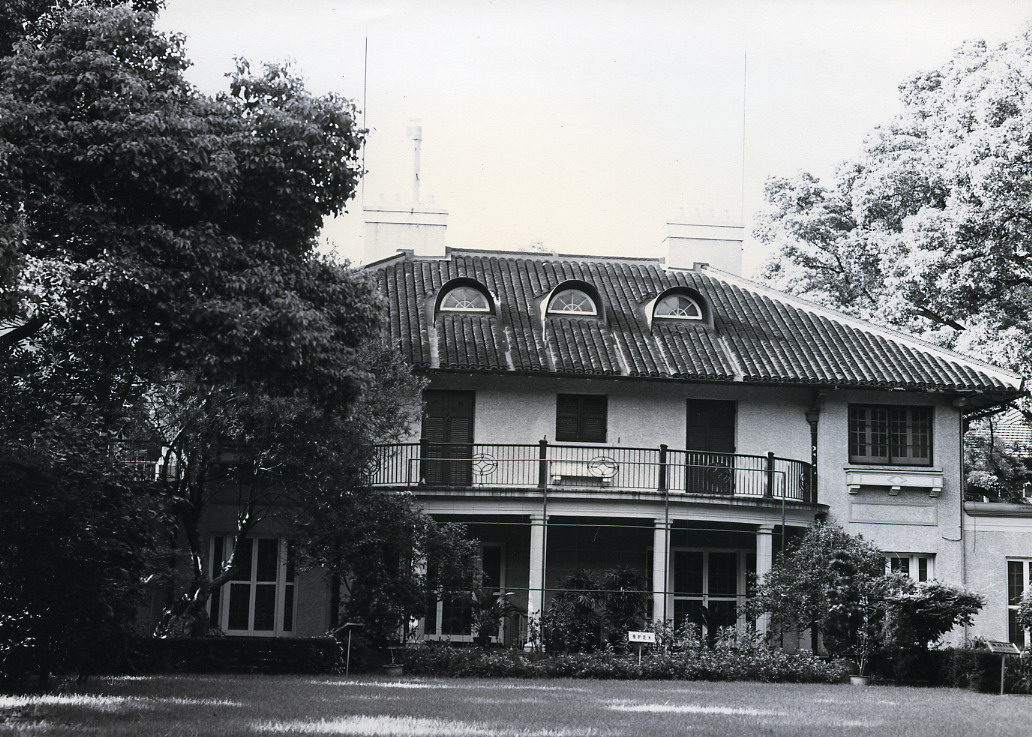
View from the garden of the former residence of Soong Ching-ling, wife of Sun Yat-sen, in Shanghai.

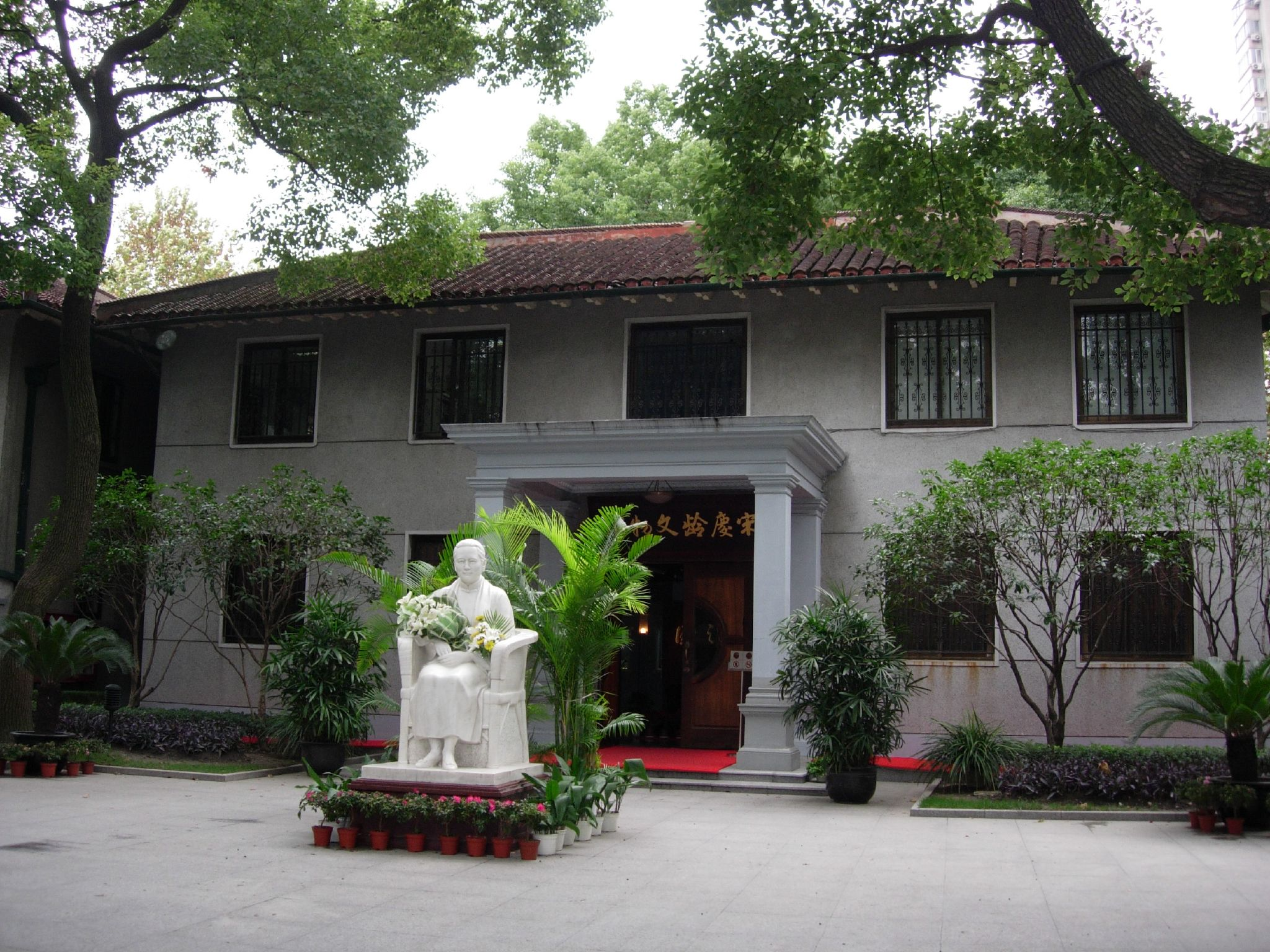
Exhibition hall building at Song Ching Ling's former residence in Shanghai, with a sculpture of Song Ching Ling in front.

The Soong Ching Ling Memorial Residence (Chinese: 宋庆龄故居), located at 1843 Middle Huaihai Road, Xuhui District, is the former residence of Soong Ching-ling (wife of Sun Yat-sen and later Vice-President and Honorary President of China) in Shanghai, China, from 1948 to 1963. It is in the west part of the former Shanghai French Concession area and was built in the 1920s by an American shipping captain, Leo R. Ball.

It covers a land area of 4,333 square metres (46,640 sq ft), and comprises a white three-story building with front and back yards.

== History ==
After the end of the Sino-Japanese War in 1945, Soong Ching-ling donated her residence, located at 29 rue Molière (present-day Xiangshan Road), to the government of the Republic of China as a memorial to her deceased husband, President Sun Yat-sen. In return, the government conferred this house on her. In spring 1949, Soong moved from 45 Jingjiang Road to this residence, where she soon witnessed the capture of Shanghai by the Chinese Communist Party.

After the establishment of the People's Republic of China in 1949, Soong served in several prominent positions in the central government, including Vice-President of China, that her residence in Shanghai became an important working space. In the house, Song met not only senior CPC leaders, including Mao Zedong, Zhou Enlai, Liu Shaoqi, Chen Yi and Deng Yingchao, but also foreign statesmen, such as Sukarno, Kim Il Sung, Kliment Voroshilov, U Nu, Sarvepalli Radhakrishnan and Sirimavo Bandaranaike.

From April 1963, due to her work, Soong spent most of her time in Beijing, and only returned to Shanghai for occasional stays and holidays. On December 31, 1978, Song returned to Shanghai for the Spring Festival and stayed there until the end of February 1979. This was her last stay in Shanghai.

Soong died in Beijing on May 29, 1981. Her house in Shanghai was refurbished and opened to a limited circle in October. On October 22 of that year, the memorial residence was accredited with being a Shanghai Municipal Preserved Cultural Relic by the city government. It was opened to the public in May 1988, and became one of patriotic education sites in Shanghai. On June 25, 2001, Song's memorial residence became a National Key Preserved Cultural Relic honored by the State Council.

== Collection ==
The residence hosts a collection of over 15,000 of Song's items. Among them, there are pictures, letters, Song's college diploma, collected books, daily utensils, presents from state activities, and also some articles belonging to her relatives. In addition, there are the seals of Sun Yat-sen, preserved by Song after many troubles.

== See also ==
- Former Residence of Soong Ching-ling (Beijing)
- Former Residence of Sun Yat-sen, Shanghai
- List of Major National Historical and Cultural Sites in Shanghai
- Tomb of Soong Ching-ling
