= Former Residence of Sun Yat-Sen (Shanghai) =

House in China

- 上海中山故居
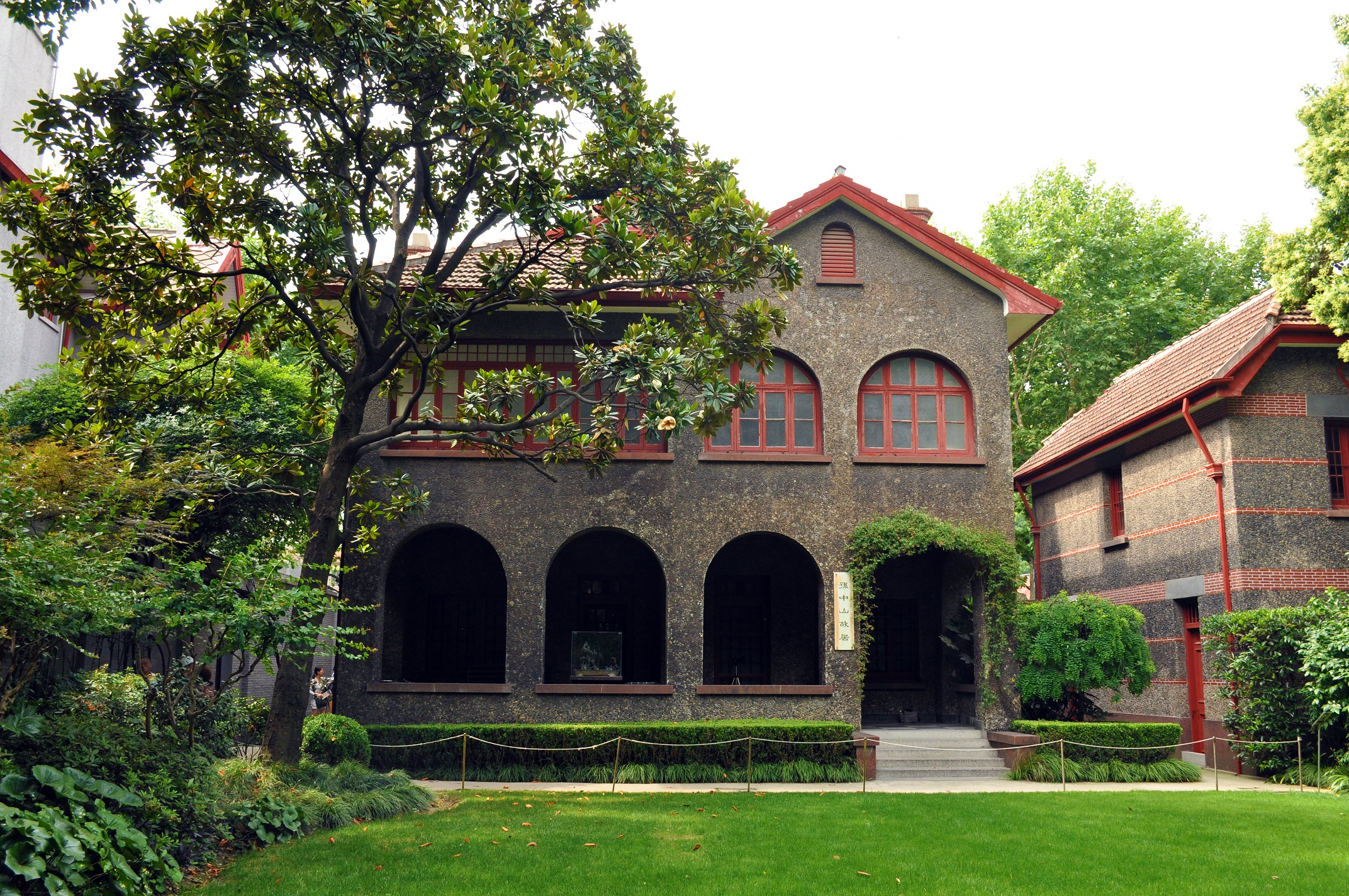
- Facade of Sun Yat-sen's house in Shanghai
- Interactive map of the Former Residence of Sun Yat-Sen (Shanghai) area

General information
- Location: 7 Xiangshan Road (aka Rue Molière), Huangpu, Shanghai, China
- Coordinates: 31°13′05″N 121°27′47″E
- Year built: early 20th century

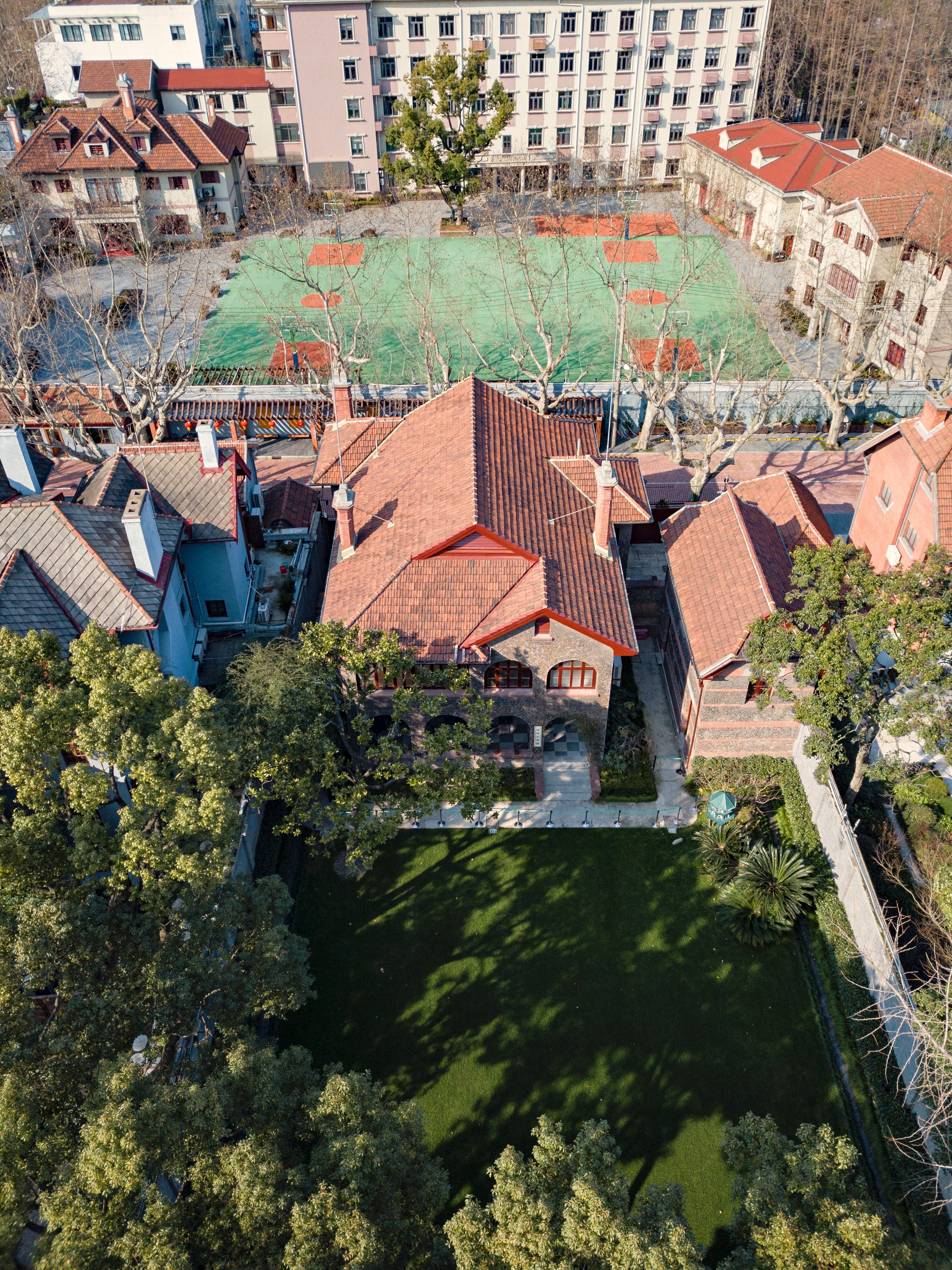
Aerial view of Sun Yat-sen's house in Shanghai.

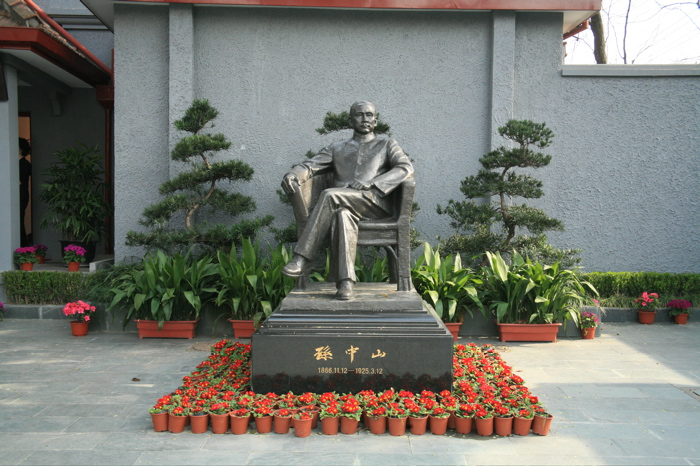
Statue of Sun Yat-sen, father of modern China, at his former residence in Shanghai.

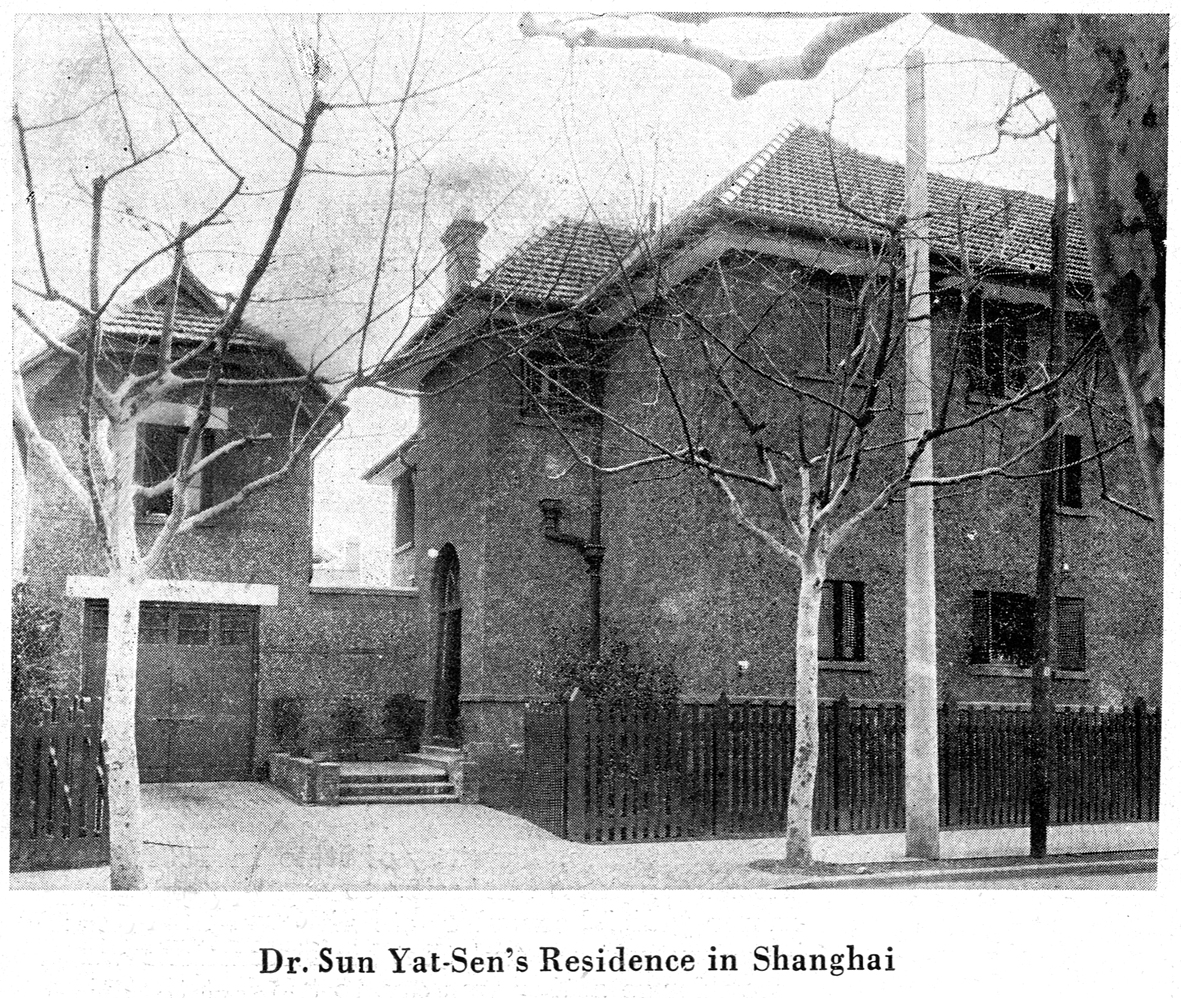
Historic picture of Sun Yat-sen's house in Shanghai c.1924

The Former Residence of Sun Yat-sen (Chinese: 上海中山故居; pinyin: Shànghǎi Zhōngshān Gùjū), located at 7 Xiangshan Road (aka Rue Molière) in the French Concession area of Shanghai, China, near Fuxing Park to the east, was the residence of the Chinese revolutionary Dr. Sun Yat-sen (1866–1925).

The house was bought by four overseas Chinese in Canada for Sun Yat-sen in 1918, after learning that he had no fixed residence and had been paying a monthly rent for his place in Shanghai. He lived there with his wife Soong Ching-ling until 1924, when he moved to Beijing. After his death, Soong continued to live there until 1937. There is now an exhibition centre presenting Sun Yat-sen's life, together with some artifacts and a statue of Sun Yat-sen outside.

In 1961, this house was listed as Major cultural heritage sites under national-level protection.

== See also ==
- Cuiheng, Sun Yat-sen's birthplace
- Sun Yat Sen Memorial House, Macau
- Song Ching Ling Memorial Residence in Shanghai
- Former Residence of Zhou Enlai in Shanghai (to the south)
- Major National Historical and Cultural Sites (Shanghai)
