= Former Residence of Zhu De =

- 朱德故居
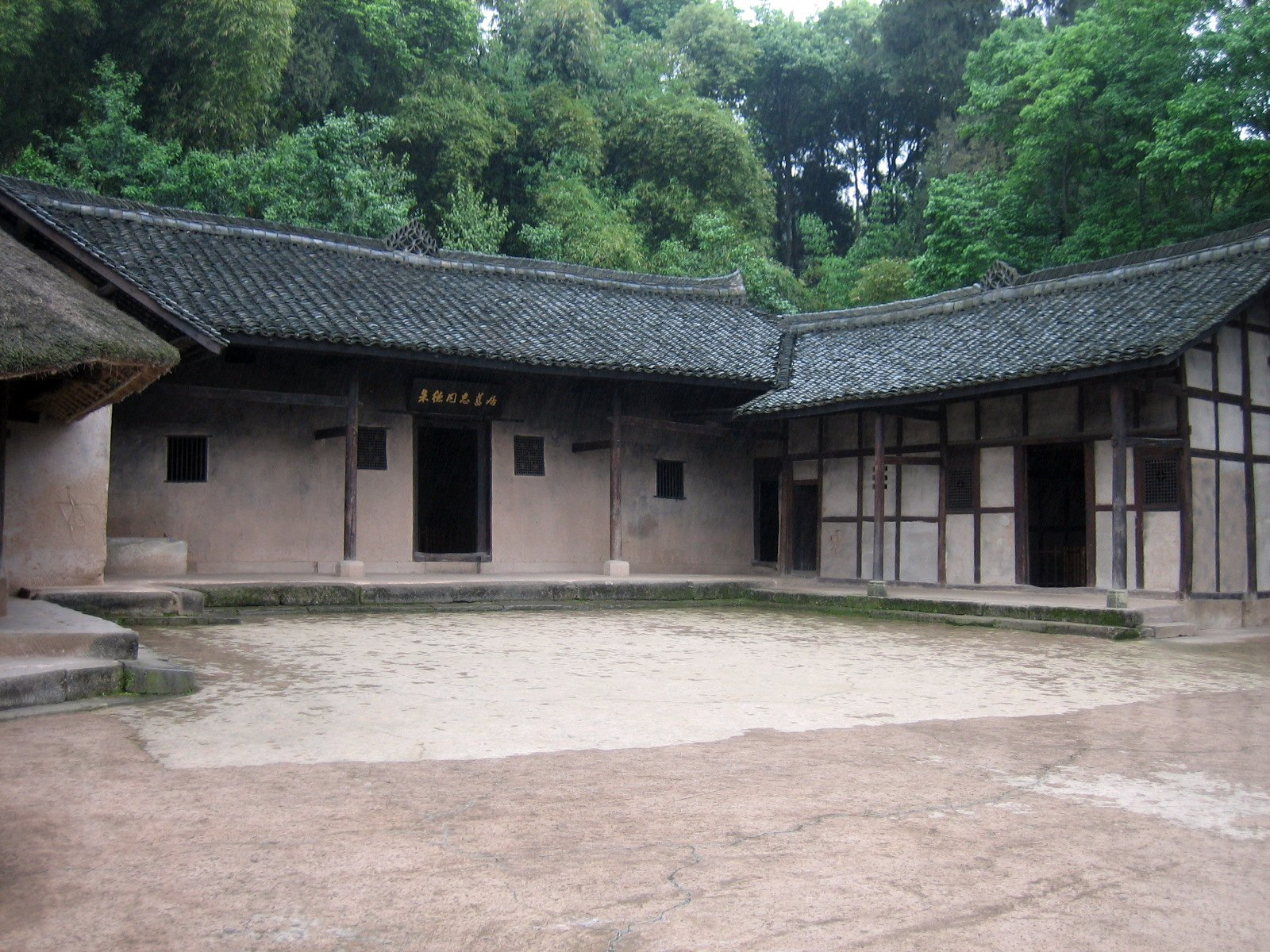
- Former Residence of Zhu De

- Location within Sichuan

General information
- Type: Traditional folk houses
- Architectural style: Chinese architecture
- Location: Linlang Village, Ma'an Town, Yilong County, Sichuan, China
- Coordinates: 31°27′56″N 106°36′56″E
- Completed: 1820

Technical details
- Material: Brick and wood
- Floor area: 2,560 m^{2} (27,600 sq ft)
- Grounds: 18,000 m^{2} (190,000 sq ft)

Website
- zhudeguli.com/international/english.html

Zhu De's Former Residence (Chinese: 朱德故居; pinyin: Zhū Dé Gùjū) was built during the late Qing Dynasty (1644–1911). It is located in Linlang Village, Ma'an Town, Yilong County, Sichuan, China. It has a building area of about 2560 square meters, embodies buildings such as the old houses, the Zhu De Memorial Hall, the statue of Zhu De, the Cultural relics Exhibition Hall, and Lancao Garden (兰草园).

== History ==
The house was built by Zhu De's ancestors in 1820, in the 25th year of Jiaqing period (1821–1851) in the Qing dynasty (1644–1911).

On 11 December 1886, Zhu De was born here. Zhu De lived here from the beginning of his life for a full 14 years, and spent his teenage years here.

In July 1980, it was listed as a provincial culture and relics site by the People's Government of Sichuan.

In 1988, it has been designated as a "Major National Historical and Cultural Sites" by the State Council of China.

On 1 August 1982, Deng Xiaoping wrote the Chinese characters "Zhu De's Former Residence" on the horizontal tablet.

On 11 December 1996, the statue of Zhu De was established. At the same year, it was listed as a National Patriotic Education Base.
