= Former Residence of Zhou Enlai (Huai'an) =

Coordinates: 33.5067274°N 119.1429046°E

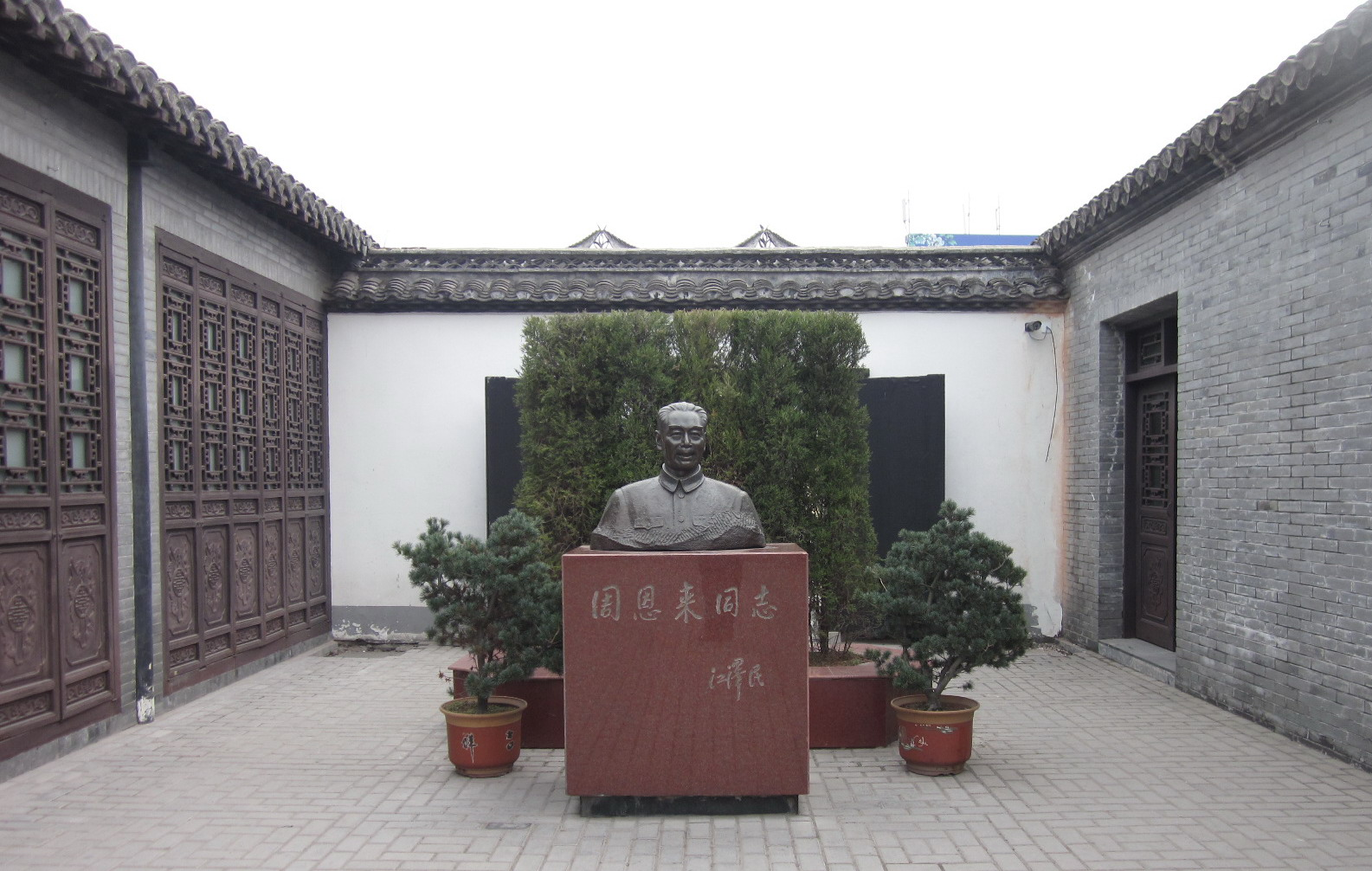
Zhou Enlai.

The Former Residence of Premier Zhou Enlai was the childhood home of Zhou Enlai, the first Premier of the People's Republic of China, located in Huai'an, China.

== Residence ==
The residence was first built during the Qing Dynasty. It is located in a valley called FuMa (驸马 meaning "the husband of the princess") in Huacheng Town of Huai'an. The residence consists of two messuages. That is the East Messuage and the West Messuage. There are 32 rooms in the house. In some there are photographs documenting Zhou's childhood, his family, his hometown, and people's admiration for him. Zhou lived, relaxed, and studied there for nearly 12 years. There is a beautiful hall called the "Butterfly Lobby" where Zhou's mother lived. There one can also see an old well.

=== Gate ===
There are seven Chinese characters (周恩来同志故居; Zhōu'ēnlái tóngzhì gùjū; Comrade Zhou Enlai's Former Residence) written by Deng Xiaoping across the top of the gate.

=== East messuage ===
The room in which Zhou was born was in the East Messuage. Little Zhou also studied in the East Messuage. The room in which Zhou, his stepmother and his wet nurse resided was also in the East Messuage. The patches in the quilts prove that this family lived a hard life at that time. In the East Messuage, one can also see the old well and the vegetable plot.

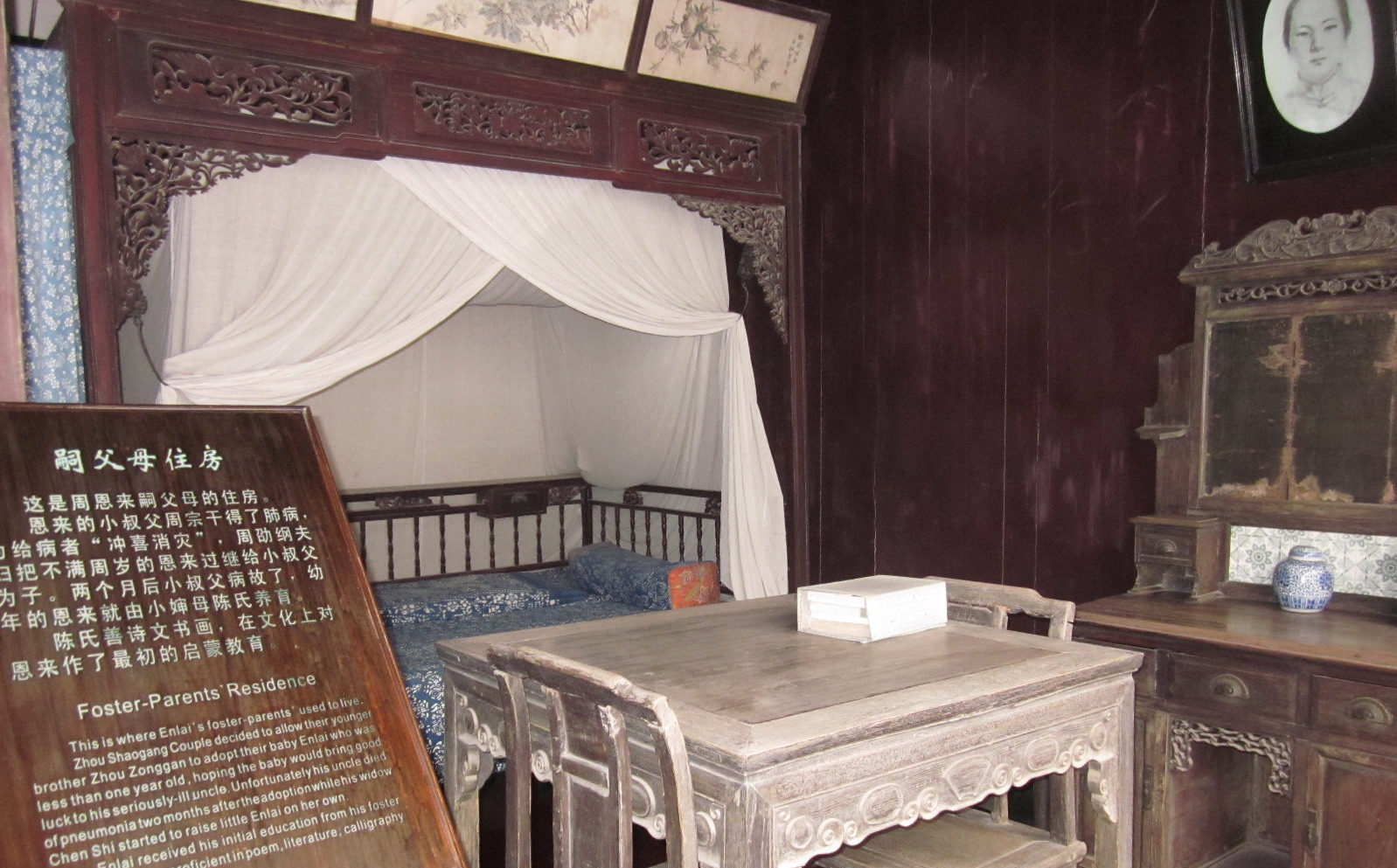
The Birth Place of Zhou Enlai.

=== West messuage ===
Here are mainly displays of calligraphy and paintings. People see calligraphy written by Zhou's grandfather and photos telling the story of little Zhou and contributions he made to the People's Republic of China.

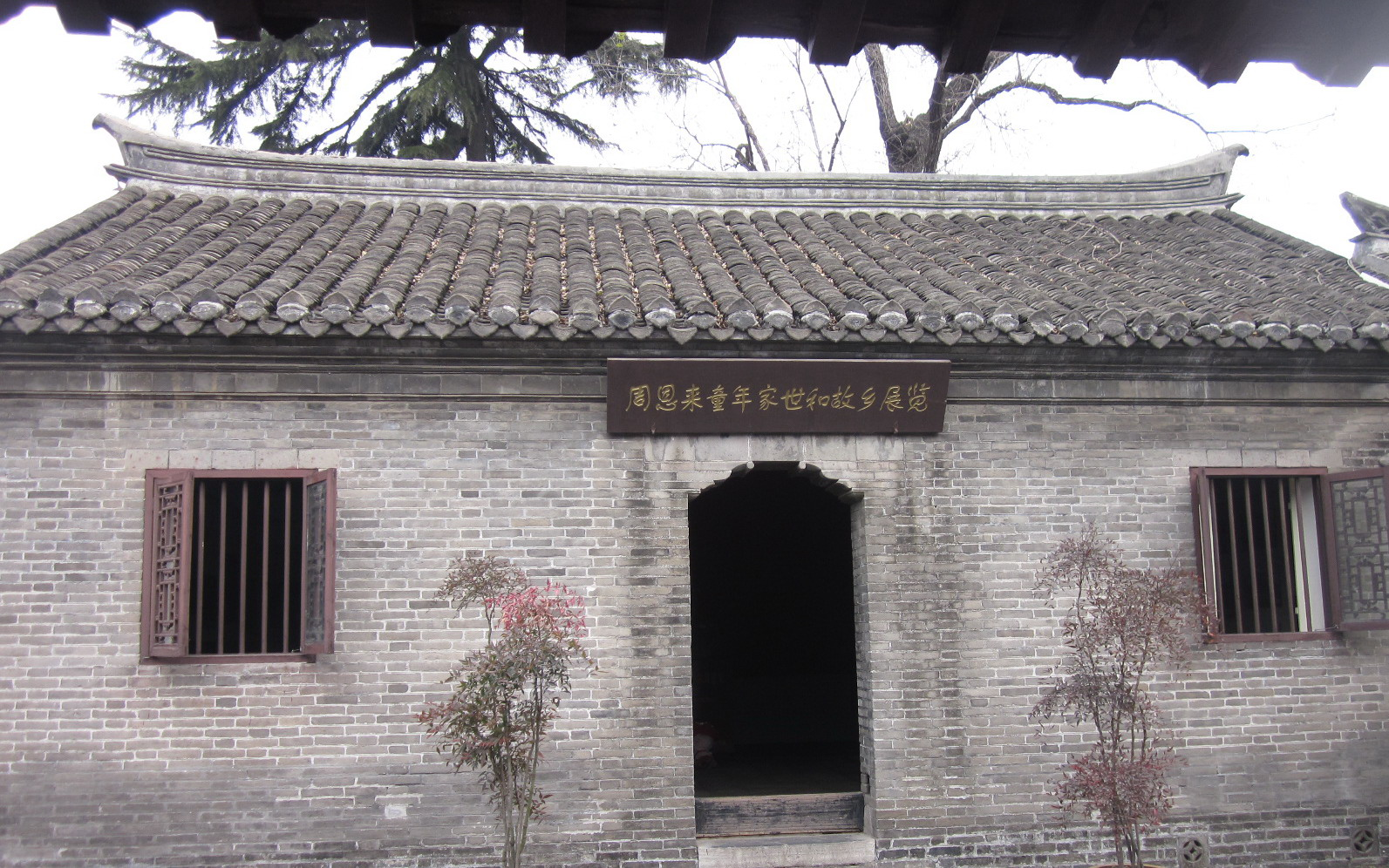
Exhibition hall.

=== The garret (亭子间) and Zhou's three mothers ===
This is where little Zhou and his mothers lived. Zhou is the eldest grandson of his family. His parents gave him the name "Da Luan" (大鸾. It is a kind of bird which is similar to a phoenix. In China, these birds symbolizes auspice and happiness.) He has three mothers. First is his biological mother, Mrs Wang (万十二姑). Mrs Wan was educated in the family school for about 6 years. So she paid attention to Zhou's education. The second mother is Mrs Chen. Mrs Chen is Zhou's adoptive mother and also his aunt. Zhou's uncle was seriously ill and dad no child. In old days in China, there was a saying that of all who lack filial piety, people who has no children are the worst. (不孝有三,无后为大) So the couple adopted Zhou in order to make his uncle happy and remove his disease. (In the old days, it was called "冲喜 Chongxi") Mrs Chen was born to a scholarly family and was a typical Chinese woman. Her father was a Xiu Cai in the Qing Dynasty. So she taught Zhou a lot of knowledge. When he was 4 years old, Mrs Chen taught him some Chinese words and some poetry of the Tang Dynasty. Zhou was sent to the family school at the age of 5. After school, Zhou always listened to Mother Chen telling some historical stories. Zhou read Three Character Classic (三字经), Thousand Character Classic (千字文), Great Learning (大学), The Analects (论语) and Mencius (孟子) with the help of Mother Chen. The third mother of Zhou is Mother Jiang. Mrs Jiang was Zhou's wet nurse. She was a peasant woman. The characters of the plain peasant woman also influenced Zhou a lot. However, his mothers didn't accompany him for a long time. His biological mother died of Pulmonary disease at the age of 35 in 1907. One year later, his adoptive mother Mrs Chen also died. When he was 12, his father's elder brother brought him to the Northeast. As a result, he had to say goodbye to his wet nurse. These three women influenced Zhou Enlai greatly during his life.

=== The old well and vegetable plot ===
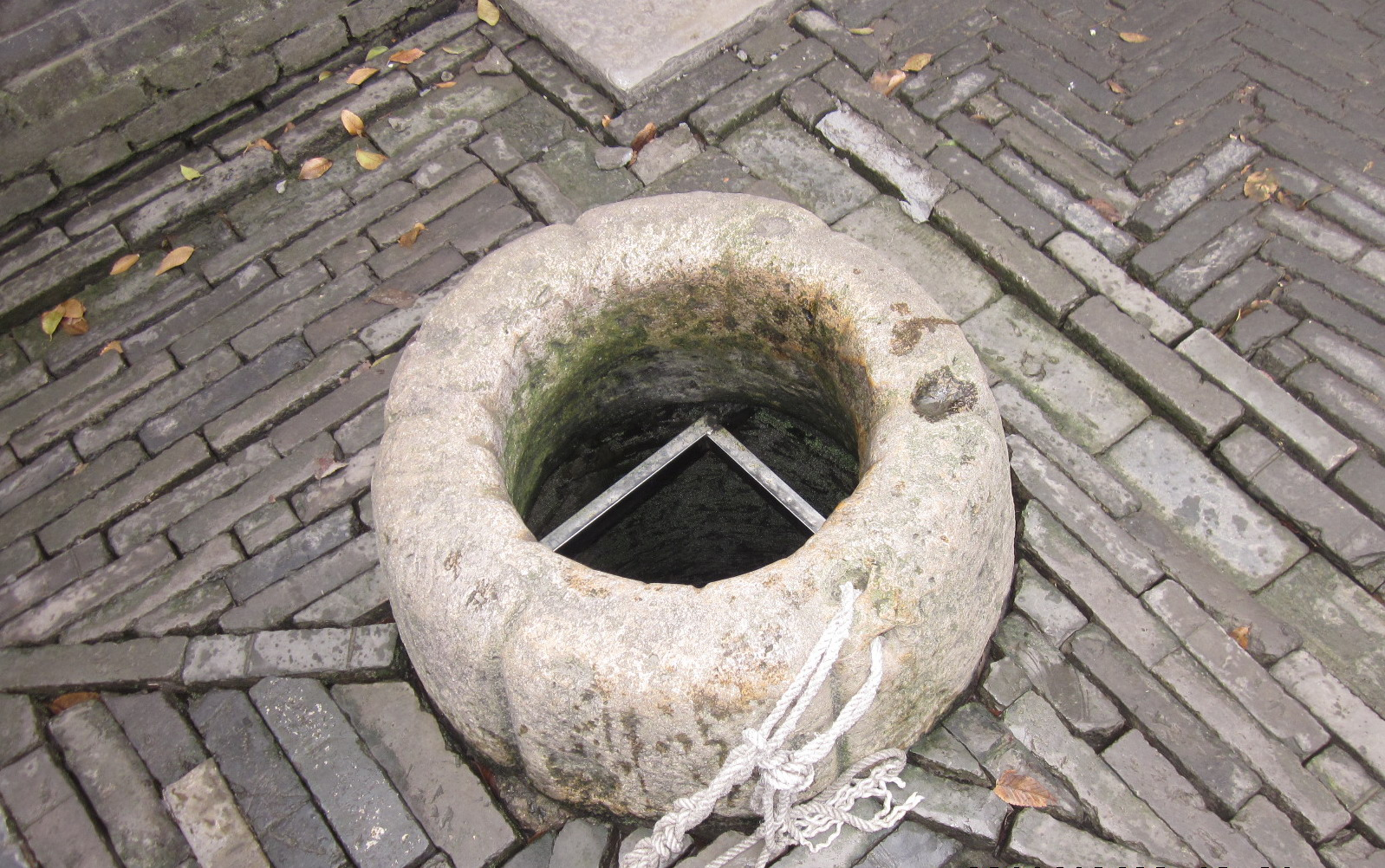
The old well.

There is an old well behind the Garret. In the brandreth, the scratches caused by the rub between the role and the well can be seen clearly. The residence kitchen was located southeast of the old well. In front of the kitchen, one can see the vegetable plot. Little Zhou spent a lot of time with his wet nurse here. Beside the old well, there are two ancient elm trees, each about 20 meters high. They are protected by the Jiangsu province government.

=== Wen Qu (Wen Canal) ===
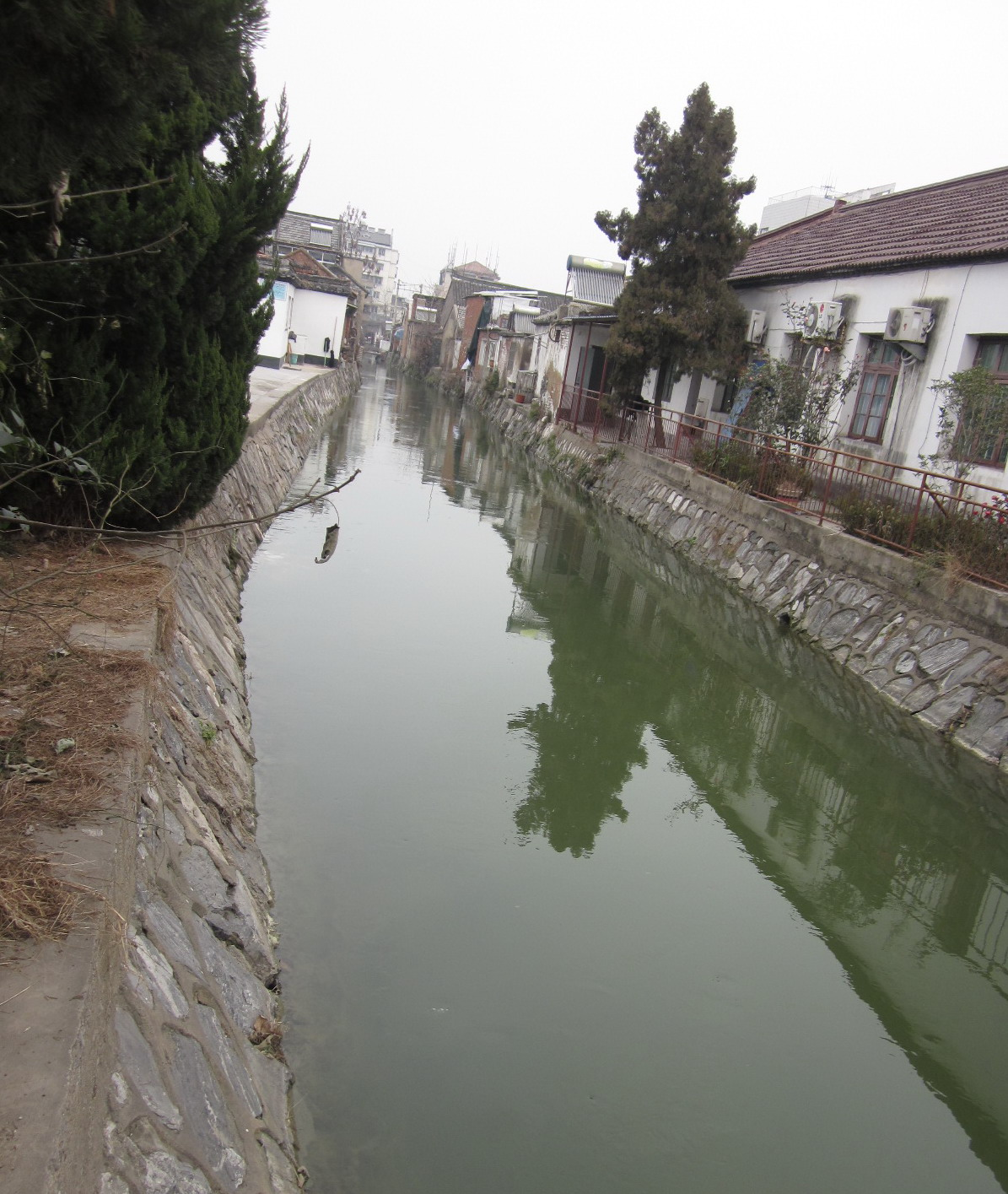
Wen Qu.

Wen Qu (文渠), is considered to be the mother river of Huaian. It was first built in 1623 CE. It flows through the city and in front of the former residence of Premier Zhou. Since its excavation, Wen Qu offers domestic water to the people of Huaian. It is also used for irrigation and for drainage in the rainy season.

==== Bridges over Wen Qu ====
The ancient inhabitants of Huaian built many bridges over Wen Qu. People used moorstone, black bricks and Chinese fir to build these bridges. Most of the bridges are masonry structures or timberwork. They chose Chinese fir because this wood can bear heavy loads and resist decay. It is also convenient for people to mend. The carpenters who built these bridges are called "Gao Zuo" (高作) or "Gao carpenter" (高木匠). However, in 2004, the last two masonry structure Single arch bridges (Xing Wen bridge, 兴文桥 and Wei Xi bridge, 慰西桥) are dismantled in order to build the pedestrian street. Some of the bridges are named from some stories.

- Kua Xia bridge (胯下桥): comes from a story of Hanxin. When Hanxin was poor, he was once challenged by a hooligan and was asked to crawl through between the hooligan's legs. Han bore the shame. With this Character, he became one of the "Three Heroes of the early Han Dynasty". (胯下之辱)
- The King bridge (大圣桥): was named after the Monkey King who is the main character in the book "Journey to the West" written by Wu Cheng'en.
- San Si bridge (三思桥): San Si means "thinking twice". The bridge warns officials that they should think twice before exercising their power.

Some of the bridges are named in accordance with the Bagua Azimuth (八卦方位):

- Qing Long Bridge (青龙桥)
- Bai Hu Bridge (白虎桥)
- Zhu Que Bridge (朱雀桥)
- Zheng Wu Bridge (真武桥)

=== Zhou and his residence ===
Zhou Enlai became the first Premier of People's Republic of China in 1949. Many people visited his residence in Huaian. Zhou once wrote to the Huaian government and made two requests. First, he hoped that the government would not open his former residence to the public in memory of him. Second, is that don't make people move out of the house who have been living here for a long time. In 1973, he gave three orders: 1. Do not let people visit these houses, 2. Do not encourage people who live in these houses to move out, and 3. Do not mend these houses.

Many Chinese leaders made calligraphy here and speak highly of him. In 1984, Hu Yaobang paid a visit to the residence. Half a year later, Jiang Zemin also visited to show respect for Zhou Enlai. In 2004, Hu Jingtao came to Huaian and visited the Former residence of Premier Zhou Enlai. Now many people come here to pay a visit in memory of Zhou Enlai.

== See also ==
- Former Residence of Zhou Enlai (Shanghai)
