= Wukang =

Wukang may refer to:

== Places ==
- Wukang County, former county in Zhejiang that has been merged into Deqing County
- Wukang Road, a historic road in Shanghai, named after Wukang County
- Wukang Mansion, a historic apartment building on Wukang Road

== People ==
- Xiong Wukang (Chinese: 熊毋康), ruler of the state of Chu during the early Zhou Dynasty (1046–256 BC) of ancient China
- Fu Wukang

== See also ==
- Wugang (disambiguation), romanized as Wukang in Wade–Giles
