= Daguangming =

Daguangming may refer to:

- Grand Theatre (Shanghai), also known as Daguangming Cinema
- Daguangmingdian, a nonextant Taoist temple in Beijing, China

== See also ==
- Guangming (disambiguation)
