= Wukang Road =

Street in Shanghai, China

Coordinates: 31.2076°N 121.4401°E

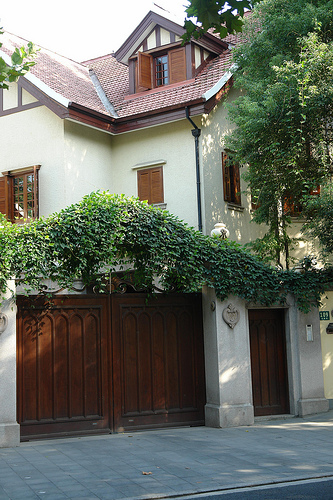
109 Wukang Road.

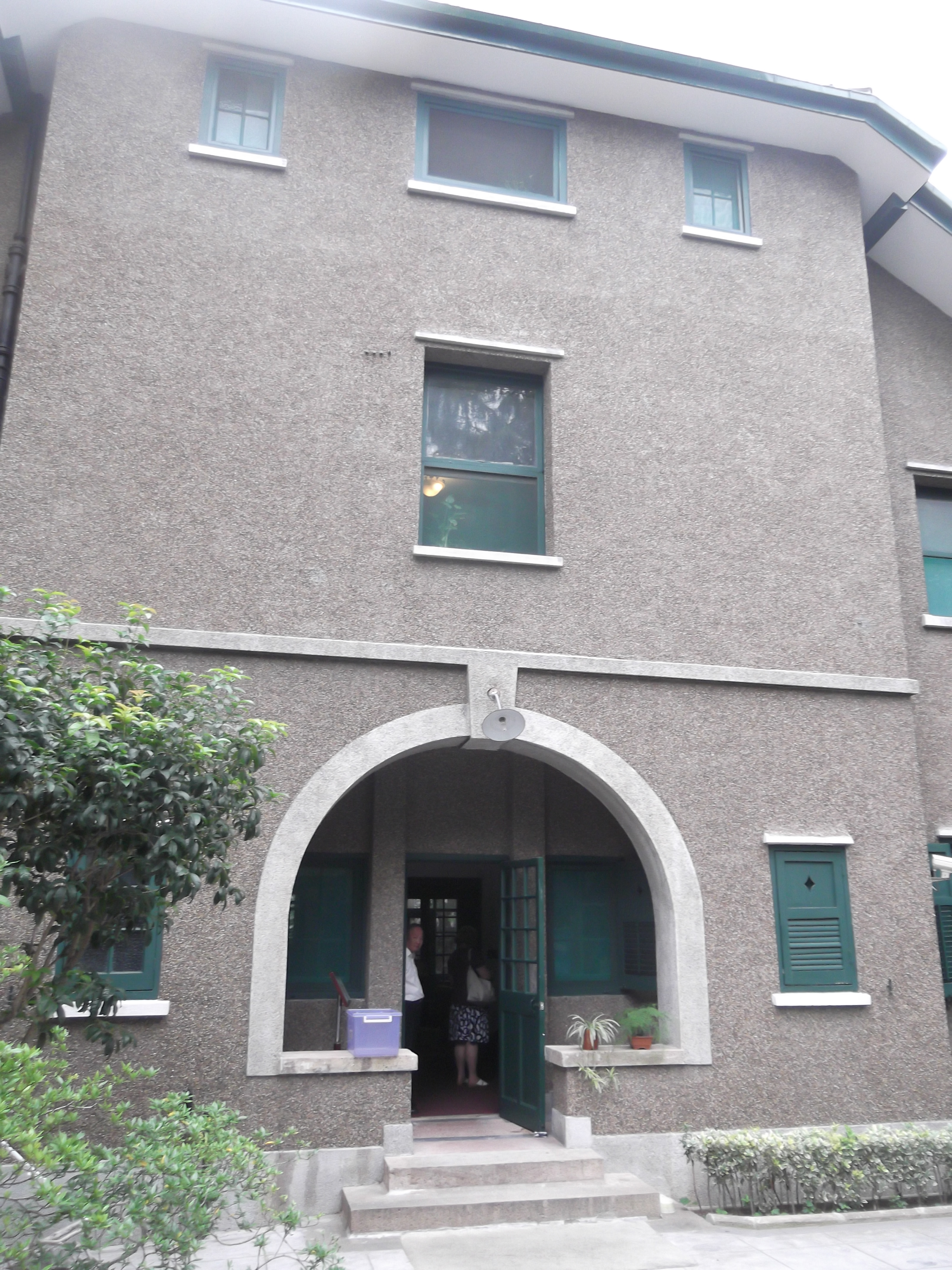
Former Residence of Ba Jin at 113 Wukang Road.

Wukang Road (Chinese: 武康路; pinyin: Wǔkāng Lù; Shanghainese: Wukhån Lu), originally Route Ferguson (福开森路), is a historic road in the Xuhui District of Shanghai, China, located in the western part of the former French Concession area of the city. In 2011 Wukang Road was recognized as one of the National Historic and Cultural Streets of China.

== Overview ==
Wukang Road is only 1.17 kilometres (0.73 mi) long, but is lined with 37 officially protected historic buildings. The buildings in the road incorporate a diverse range of architectural styles, including Mediterranean, French Renaissance, English, and Art Deco. The area is characterized by quiet streets lined with wutong (London plane) trees. Well-known blogger Wang Jianshuo calls it his favourite street in Shanghai. Increasing café and restaurant openings have led to more tourists visiting the street.

In Ang Lee's 2007 film Lust, Caution, Route Ferguson is where the hero and heroine have their secret rendezvous. The road is also featured in Chen Danyan's novel Shanghai Memorabilia. It is a popular sightseeing location for tourists interested in the architecture and history of the area. There is a tourist information center at 393 Wukang Road that provides self-guided walking tours.

== History ==
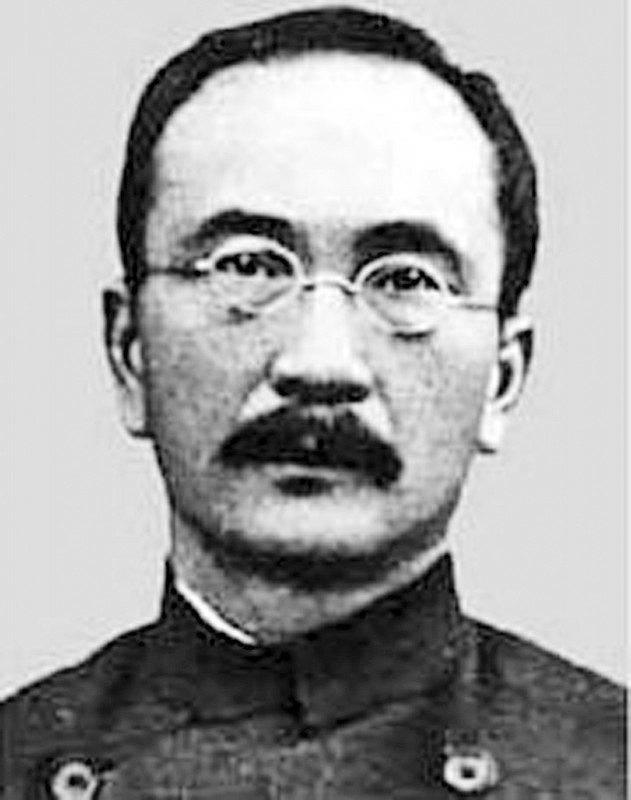
Former Prime Minister Tang Shaoyi was assassinated at his home on Route Ferguson in 1938.

In 1897, John Calvin Ferguson, an American educator and president of Nanyang Public School (predecessor of Shanghai Jiao Tong University), built the road with his own salary to make it easier for colleagues and students to get to the school. The road was thus named Route Ferguson in his honour. It was paved in 1907 and broadened by the government of the French Concession. It was renamed Wukang Road in 1943, after Wukang County (now part of Deqing) in nearby Zhejiang province, but its original name is still well known to locals.

Wukang Road has been home for numerous Chinese celebrities, especially during the mid-20th century. Famous residents include revolutionary Huang Xing, first lady Soong Ching-ling, high-ranking politicians Zhou Fohai, Tang Shaoyi, Chen Lifu, Chen Guofu, Chen Yi, Deng Xiaoping, writers Ba Jin, Zheng Zhenduo, Li Shizeng, singer Zhou Xuan, and many movie stars and business tycoons.

In 1937, Tang Shaoyi, the first prime minister of the Republic of China, bought a house on Route Ferguson (now at No. 1, Lane 40, Wukang Road) and retired there. The following year, the Imperial Japanese Army invaded and occupied Shanghai (though not yet the foreign concessions), and tried to recruit Tang to head a pro-Japanese puppet government. Fearing Tang may collaborate with the Japanese, the Kuomintang assassinated him at his home on 30 September 1938.

== Notable buildings ==
=== Wukang Mansion ===
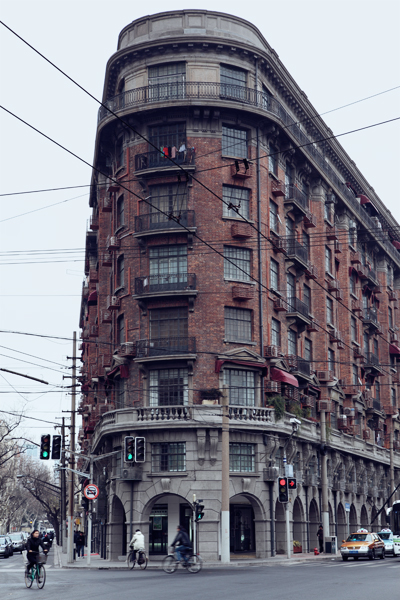
The Wukang Mansion (Normandie Apartments) at the southern end of Wukang Road.

The Wukang Mansion (formerly Normandie Apartments), at the southern end of Wukang Road, on the corner with Middle Huaihai Road, is a protected historic building. It was designed by the renowned Hungarian-Slovak architect László Hudec (1893–1958) in the French Renaissance style, and was completed in 1924. It was home to numerous celebrities including famous actors and actresses Wu Yin, Wang Renmei, Qin Yi, Zhao Dan, Sun Daolin, Wang Wenjuan, Shangguan Yunzhu, and actor/director Zheng Junli. Soong Ching-ling, the widow of President Sun Yat-sen, lived at the end of Wukang Road across Huaihai Road. Her home is now open to the public as the Soong Ching-ling Memorial Residence.

=== Former residences ===
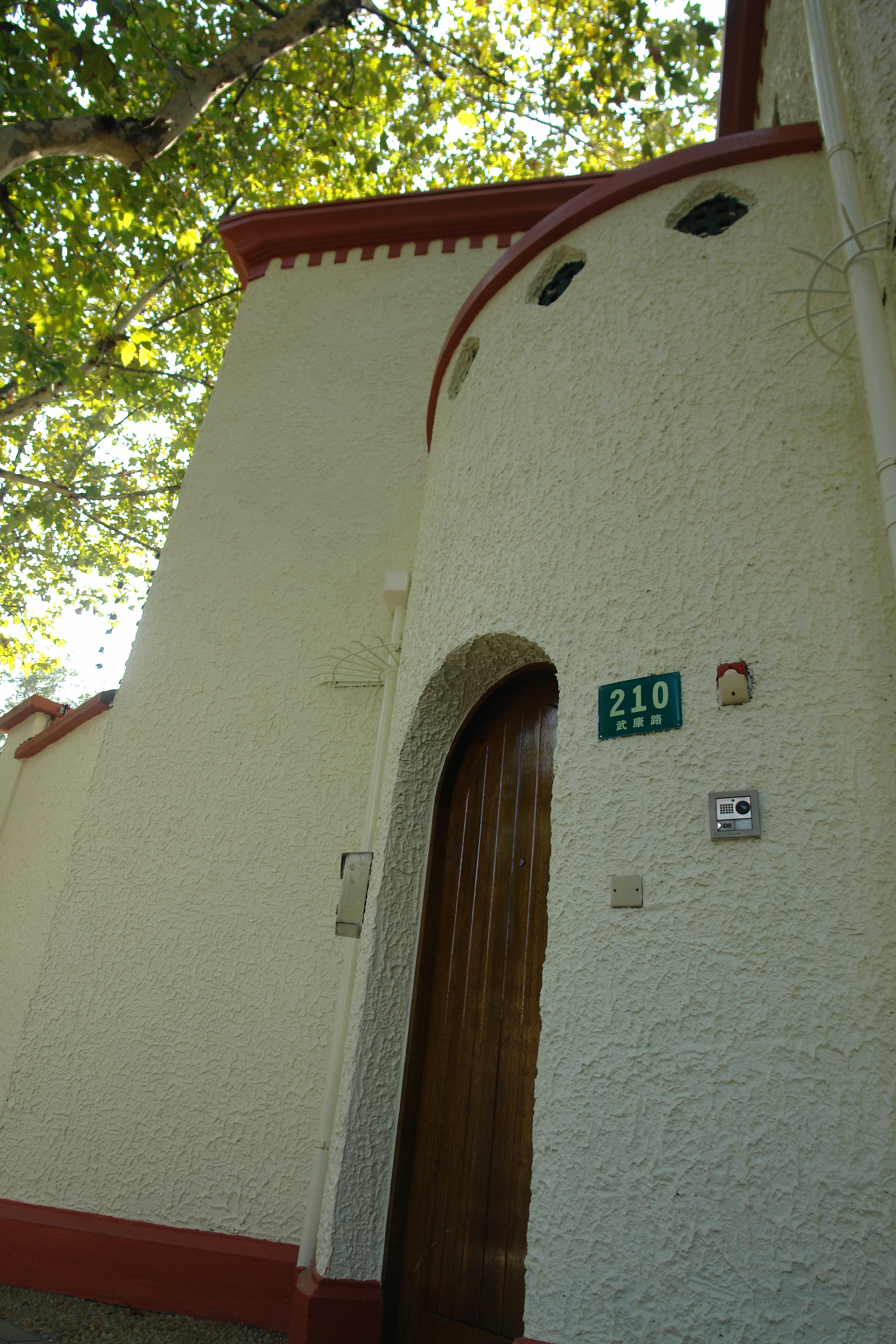
210 Wukang Road, location of "Romeo's Balcony", named after the Shakespeare character.

The road was the former residence for a number of notable people:

- No. 2: the Former Residence of Mo Shangqing, "silk czar".
- Lane 40, No. 1: the Former Residence of Tang Shaoyi, politician.
- Lane 40, No. 4: the Former Residence of Yan Fuqing, academic.
- No. 67: the Former Residence of Chen Lifu, politician.
- No. 99: the Former Residence of the British executive of the Zhengguanghe beverage company.
- Lane 107, No. 2: the Former Residence of Chen Guofu, politician.
- No. 113: the Former Residence of the writer Ba Jin (1904–2005). The house was originally built in 1923 in Spanish style. Ba Jin lived there from 1955. The residence was opened to the public in December 2011.
- Lane 117, No. 1: the Former Residence of Kincheng Banking Corporation head Zhou Zuomin (1882–1955); later the residence of Shanghai First Secretary Chen Pixian and East China Bureau Secretary Wei Wenbo.
- Lane 117, No. 2: the Former Residence of Nationalist general Li Jilan (1904–1957); later the residence of Shanghai Mayor Cao Diqiu.
- No. 274: the Former Residence of Zheng Dongguo, general.
- No. 390: the Former Residence of the Italian consul general, built in 1932. The building is now the headquarters of the Shanghai Automotive Industry Corporation.
- No. 393: the Former residence of Huang Xing, Chinese revolutionary. The south building was built in 1912 and the north building was built in the 1930s. It now houses the Wukang Road Tourist Information Center and the Xuhui Historical Building Art Center.

== See also ==
- Shanghai Library, to the southeast of Wukang Road
