= Huadong Hospital =

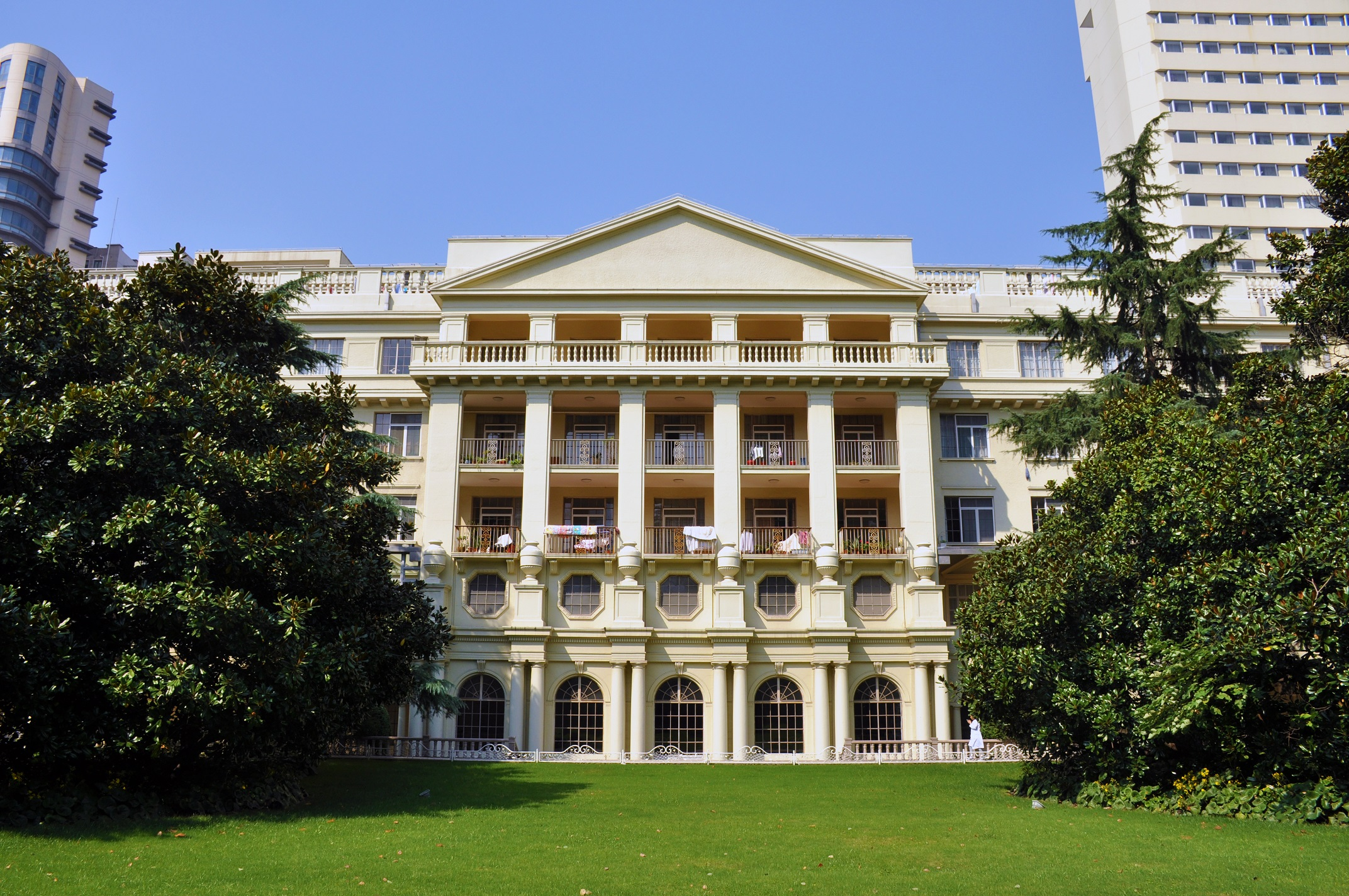
- The Country Hospital building (1926), designed by László Hudec

Geography
- Location: 221 West Yan'an Road, Jing'an District, Shanghai, China

Organisation
- Type: Teaching
- Affiliated university: Shanghai Medical College of Fudan University

Services
- Emergency department: Yes
- Beds: 1,283

History
- Founded: 1921 (Country Hospital); 1951 (Huadong Hospital)

Links
- Website: www.huadonghospital.com
- Lists: Hospitals in China

Huadong Hospital (Chinese: 华东医院) or East China Hospital, founded in 1921 as the Country Hospital, is a teaching hospital in Shanghai, China, affiliated with the Shanghai Medical College of Fudan University. Its main building, designed by László Hudec, is a Municipal Heritage Building of Shanghai.

== Overview ==
Huadong Hospital is a teaching hospital of the Shanghai Medical College of Fudan University. As of 2017, it has 1,283 beds and 2,113 employees, including 258 professors and associate professors. Although open to the general public, it mainly serves high-ranking officials, social and scientific elites, and foreign diplomats and visitors, with a specialty in geriatric care.

== History ==
The hospital was established in 1921 as the Country Hospital, known in Chinese as Hong'en Hospital (宏恩医院). Its main H-shaped building on Great Western Road (now Yan'an Road), opened in 1926, was donated by an anonymous British businessman to the Shanghai Municipal Council, the governing body of the Shanghai International Settlement. Designed by the Hungarian-Slovak architect László Hudec and constructed by the firm Pan Rong Ji (潘荣记), it is now protected as a Municipal Heritage Building of Shanghai.

During World War II, a large number of European Jewish refugees fled to Shanghai. The Country Hospital, under Superintendent Dr. J. E. Bowen, was one of several Shanghai hospitals that provided treatment to the refugees free of charge, including X-ray examinations.

After the founding of the People's Republic of China in 1949, the People's Liberation Army took over the hospital in October 1950. In August 1951, Huadong Hospital, then with 60 beds, was established on the site of the Country Hospital, dedicated to treating high-ranking government and military officials, distinguished experts and professors, and foreign diplomats and visitors.

Huadong Hospital merged with the nearby Shanghai Publicly Funded Healthcare Hospital (Chinese: 上海市公费医疗医院) in February 1965 and took on the latter's name. The hospital was renamed Yan'an Hospital (Chinese: 延安医院) the following year. The southern wing of the building was reverted to Huadong Hospital in December 1967. It was not until 1970, when Yan'an Hospital was moved to Kunming, Yunnan Province, that the entire building was reverted to Huadong, with its northern wing open to the general public.

In 1987, it became a teaching hospital of the Shanghai Medical College, which is now the medical school of Fudan University. Several celebrities, including Ba Jin, Su Buqing and Wang Danfeng, spent their final years in the hospital. Former Chinese president Jiang Zemin died in Huadong hospital in November 2022.
