= Former Residence of Ba Jin =

House in Shanghai, China

Coordinates: 31.208°N 121.440°E

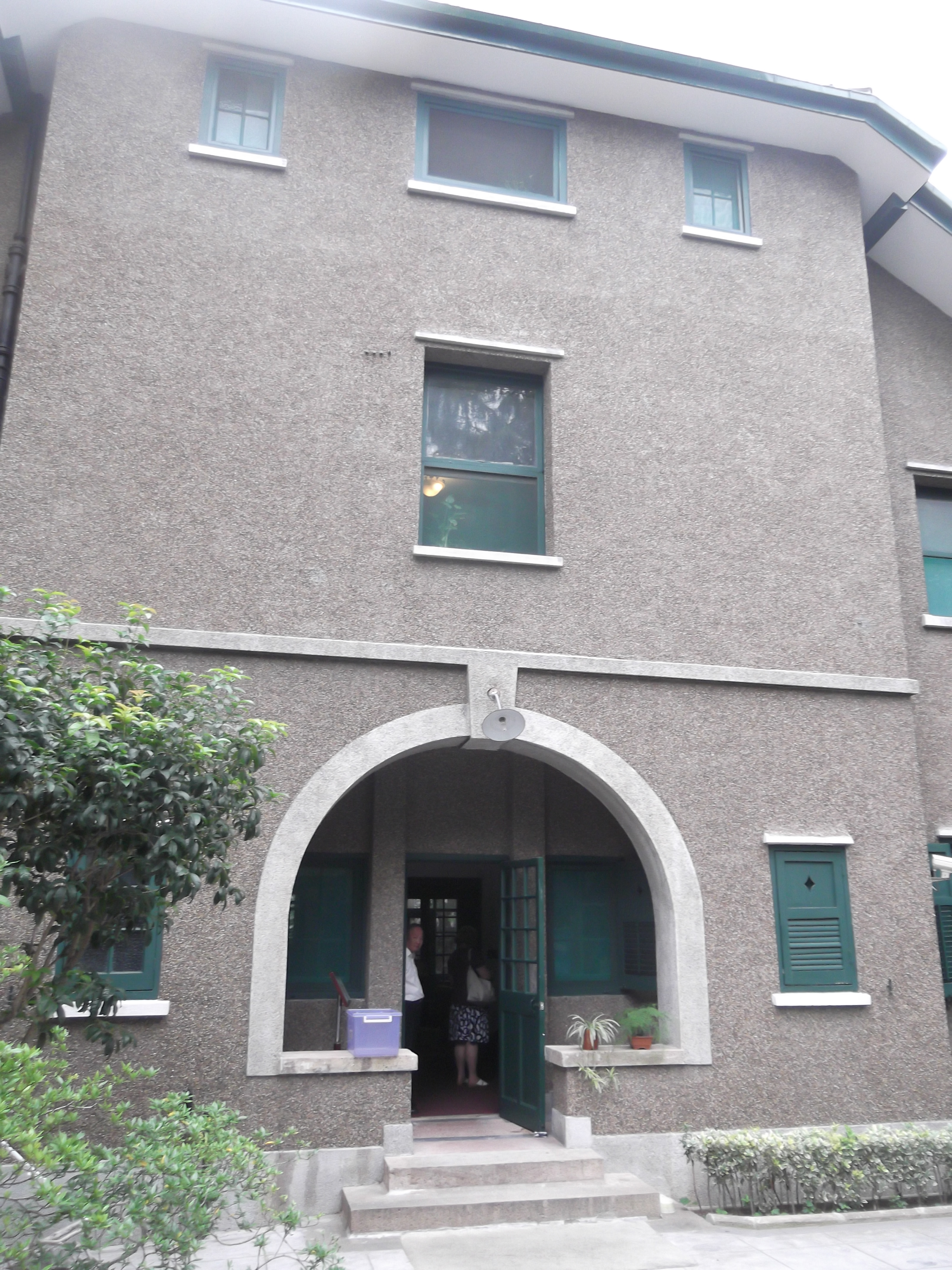
Front door of the house.

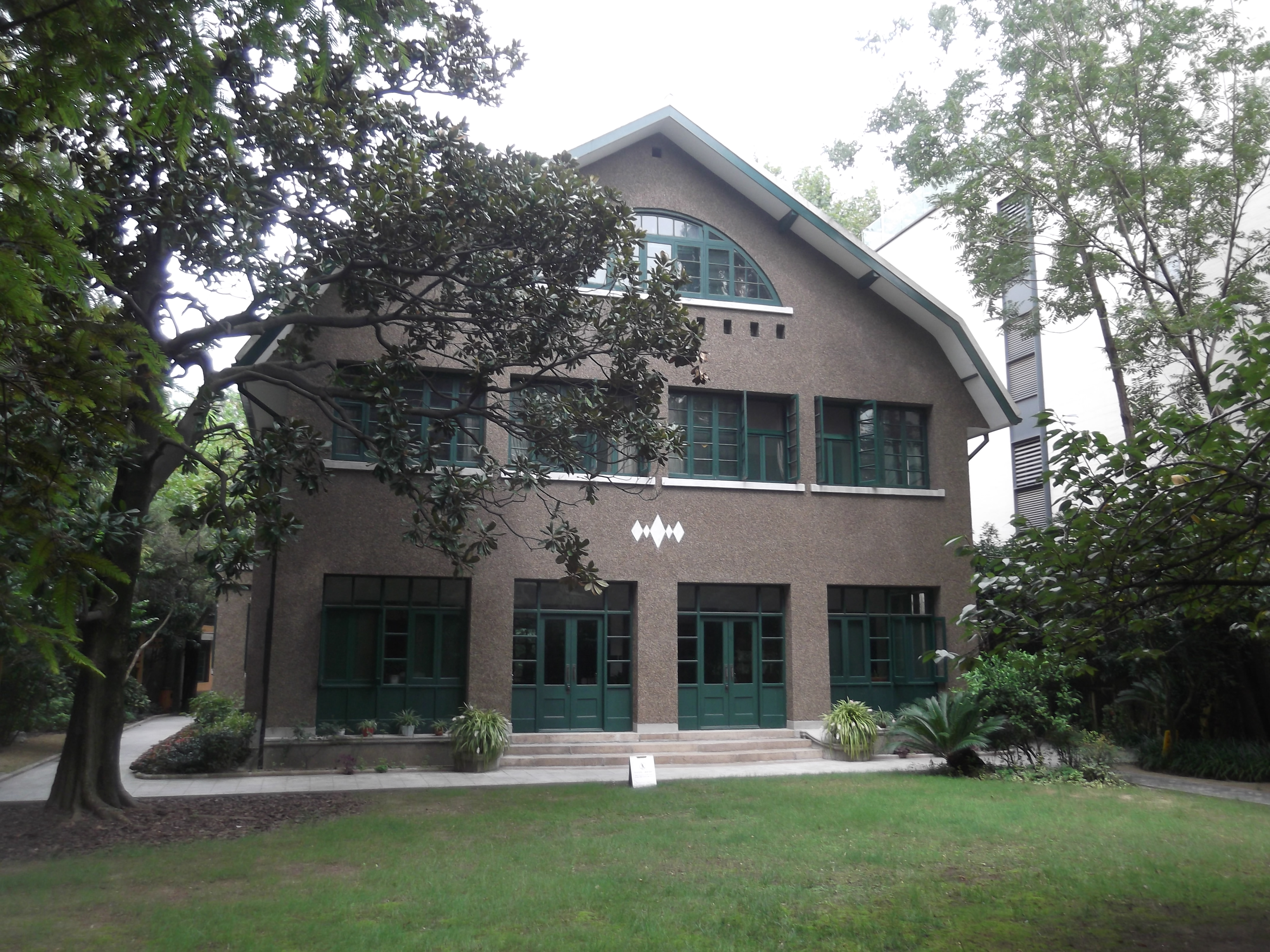
View of the house from the garden.

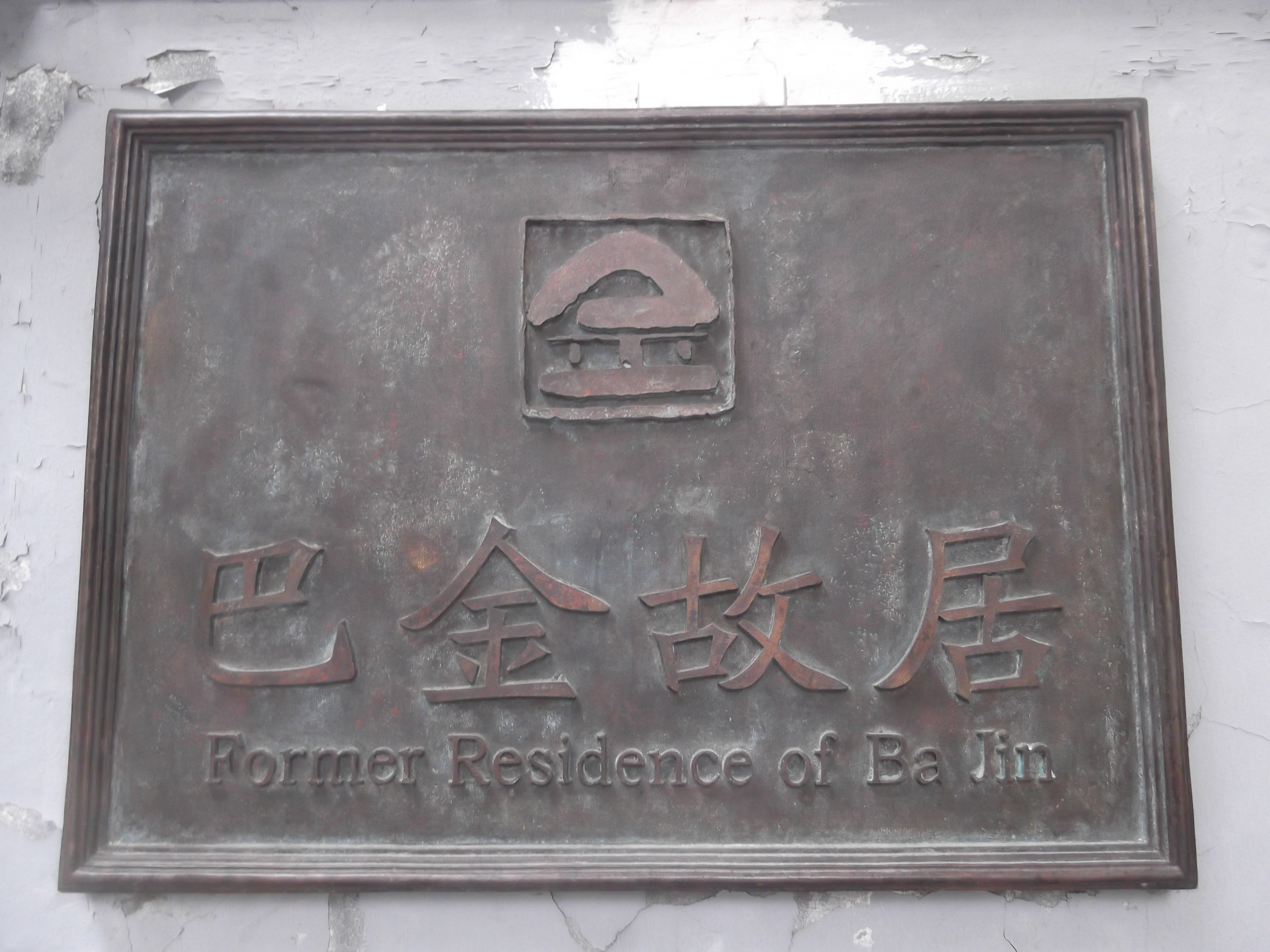
Plaque at the residence.

The Former Residence of Ba Jin (Chinese: 巴金故居), located at 113 Wukang Road in the Xuhui District of Shanghai, China, was the residence of the Chinese writer Ba Jin (1904–2005). Located in the west part of the former Shanghai French Concession area, it was originally built in 1923 in a Spanish style. Ba Jin lived there from 1955.

The residence opened to the public as a writer's home museum in December 2011. The house contains a collection of books, manuscripts, and photographs.

Ba Jin's wife, Xiao Shan, died of cancer in 1972 during the time of the Cultural Revolution, having been denied medical treatment. He kept her cinerary urn by his bed in the house. In his later years, his granddaughter, Duan Duan, lived with him, sleeping in the same bedroom. He found reading newspapers increasingly difficult, so he listened to the news on the radio in the morning and on television in the lounge each evening.

== See also ==
- Song Ching Ling Memorial Residence in Shanghai
