= Park Hotel Shanghai =

Hotel in Shanghai, China

Coordinates: 31°14′01.2″N 121°28′17.7″E

Park Hotel 国际饭店
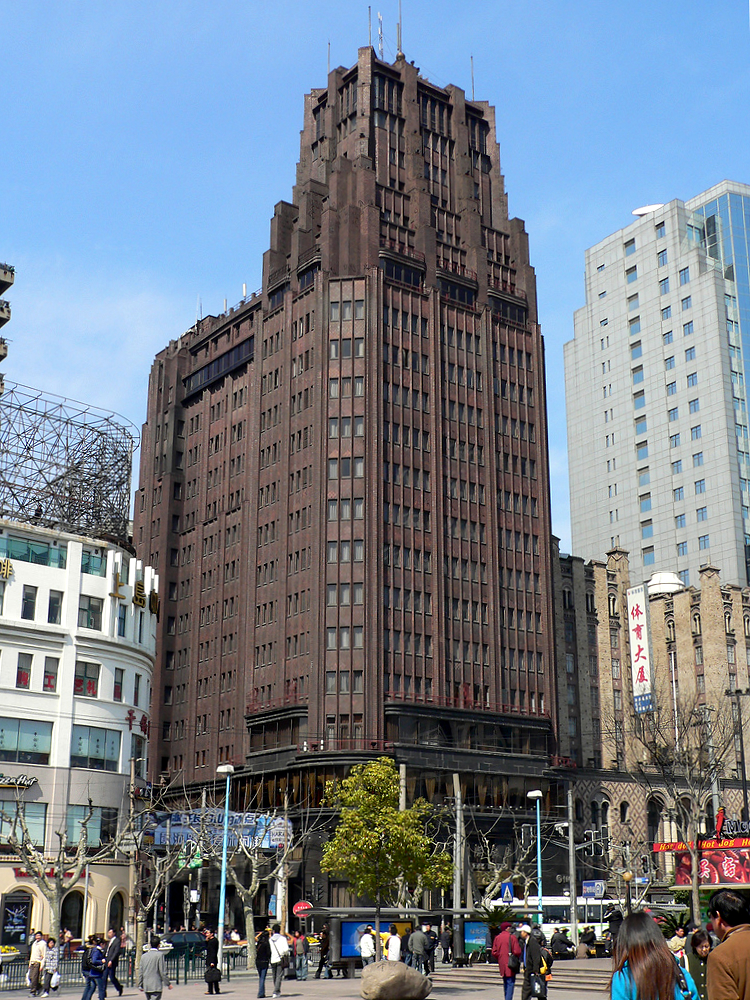
- Interactive map of the Park Hotel 国际饭店 area

General information
- Location: 170 Nanjing Road West, Shanghai 200003, People's Republic of China
- Opening: 1 December 1934
- Owner: Shanghai Jinjiang International Hotels Corp.

Technical details
- Floor count: 24
- Floor area: 15,650 square meters

Design and construction
- Architect: László Hudec
- Developer: Voh Kee Construction Company for the Joint Savings Society

Other information
- Number of rooms: 200

Park Hotel (Chinese: 国际饭店; pinyin: Guójì Fàndìan; lit. 'International Hotel'), historically the Shanghai Joint Savings Society Building, is an Art Deco hotel on Nanjing West Road, Shanghai, China. It was the tallest building in Asia from its completion in 1934 to 1963.

== History ==
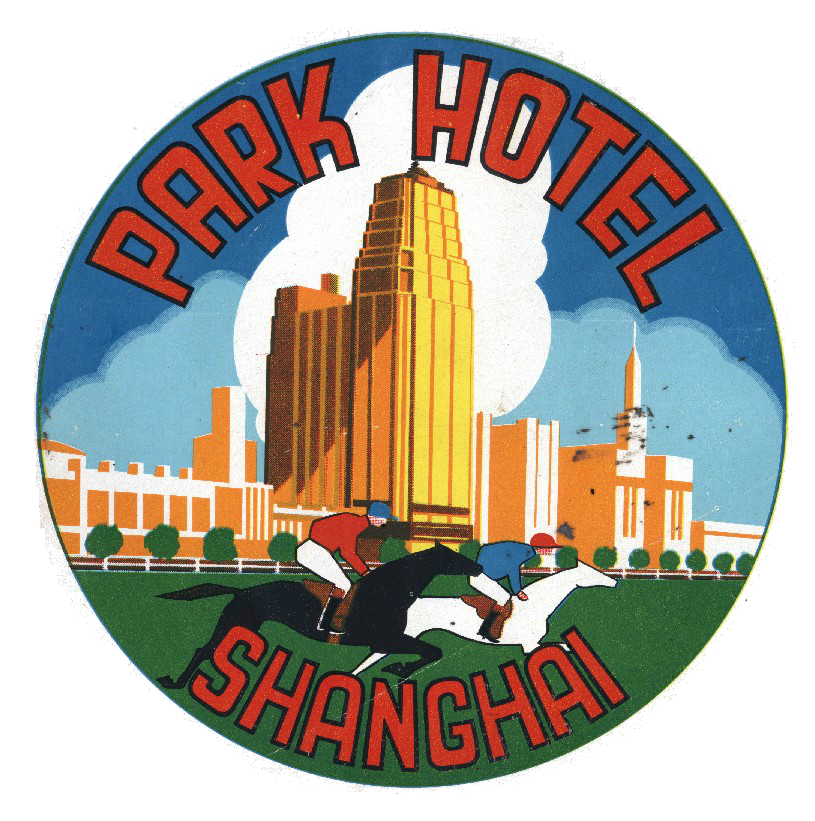
Scan of a late 1930s coaster from the Park Hotel in Shanghai

The Shanghai Joint Savings Society Building, located at No.170 Nanjing Road West, was named after the Joint Savings Society, founded in 1923 by the merger of Yienyieh Commercial Bank, Kincheng Banking corporation, the China and South Sea Bank, and the Continental Bank. It was built as a competitor for the Cathay Hotel. The building was designed by the Hungarian-Slovak architect Ladislav Hudec in March 1931 and construction was completed in December 1934. The building is 83.8 metres tall and contains 22 stories above ground and another 2 stories underground. Built by Voh Kee Construction Company, the piling project was finished by a Danish Company established by Corrit.

Strongly inspired by the American Radiator Building, it is among the well known building from Hudec in Shanghai. It remained the tallest building in China until 1966, and in Shanghai until 1983.

On February 23, 1938, G.H. Thomas wrote: "I stayed at the Park Hotel on Bubbling Well Road, where I had a great room and bath. The appointments, the bath and the service are just like in any first-class hotel in New York. A single room such as mine costs $8 a day without food."

It was built overlooking the horse racing course owned by the Shanghai Race Club, one of the most prestigious locations in Shanghai at the time. The Shanghai Race Course and the Shanghai Recreation Ground that it enclosed was later turned into the People's Park by the Shanghai Government. Originally the Park Hotel accommodated the Joint Savings Society Bank in its lower two floors, and the hotel on the upper floors.

== Exterior ==
The first three floors are finished with polished black granite from Shandong Province. The upper floors are clad with dark brown brick and ceramic face tiles. The exterior has had two major changes: there is a banking entrance on one corner, and a marquee was added that masks the unique silhouette of the top floors.

== Interior ==
In 1935, the outdoor garden on the 13th floor was converted into the 14th floor banquet space and surrounded by windows and covered with a retractable roof. That roof is now a back-lit glass panel set into a ceiling.

Most of the interior was changed by the government in the 1950s because they disliked the existing bourgeois style. The building was renovated again in the 1980s to partially refurbish into the original style. In 1997, American designer George Grigorian remodeled some the interior using an Art Deco style. American architect Christopher Choa restored the Art Deco lobby in 2001.
