= An Appeal to the Young =

"An Appeal to the Young" (French: "Aux jeunes gens") is a revolutionary, anarchist pamphlet published in 1880 and written by the Russian anarchist Peter Kropotkin. It is one of the most successful and moving tracts by Kropotkin in favor of a Socialized economy.

== Content ==
The work has been appraised by numerous authors for its inspiration and devotion. Ruth Kinna, anarchist sympathizer, has written that this pamphlet "seeks to prompt individuals to enter into resistance struggles" and that it "emphasises the power of educated youth to alleviate the suffering of the poor."

== Legacy ==
=== Russia ===
In Russia, Victor Serge read the pamphlet, and said that it inspired him to untold heights. He described it as "certainly one of the most moving exhortations of its kind." It convinced him to become a revolutionary socialist, but, more than that, "its message remained close to his heart for the rest of his life."

=== China ===
Ba Jin, later a well-known writer, converted to anarchism after reading the pamphlet.

=== Europe ===
In Europe, after it was read by the "Rossetti Sisters", the two family members, along with their brother, Arthur, launched their own anarchist publication, called the torch. In the Labour Press of the United Kingdom, this work has been reproduced, among other revolutionary pamphlets. It was also translated and republished by pioneer British socialist H.M. Hyndman, whose "lush Victorian prose ably captures the eloquence, fervor and charm of this celebrated revolutionary classic."

=== United States ===
In the United States, an edition was smuggled in by Charles H. Kerr in 1899, "in the wake of the great Anarchist's first U.S. speaking tour." And yet, after going through the Kerr Press in 1910, it was still in reproduction with the Kerr pamphlets as late as 1930. Howard Zinn has recommended this book as recommended reading to his readers.

=== India ===
In India, its message and influence spread through Sunder Lal, the Indian independence activist.

=== Ireland ===
In modern books, An Appeal to the Young has also been connected with anarchist revolutionary movements in Ireland in the 1800s.
