= Wugang =

Wugang may refer to the following places in China:

- Wugang, Henan (舞钢市), county-level city of Pingdingshan, Henan
- Wugang, Hunan (武冈市), county-level city of Shaoyang, Hunan
- Wugang, Quanjiao County (武岗镇), town in Quanjiao County, Anhui Province
- Wugang, Lianshui County (五港镇), town in Lianshui County, Jiangsu Province
- Wugang dialect, an Old Xiang Chinese dialect in Wugang, Hunan, China
- Wugang Airport
- Wugang steel works

== See also ==
- Wukang (disambiguation)
