= Grand Theatre (Shanghai) =

Cinema in Shanghai, China

Grand Cinema
- 大光明电影院
- Grand Theatre
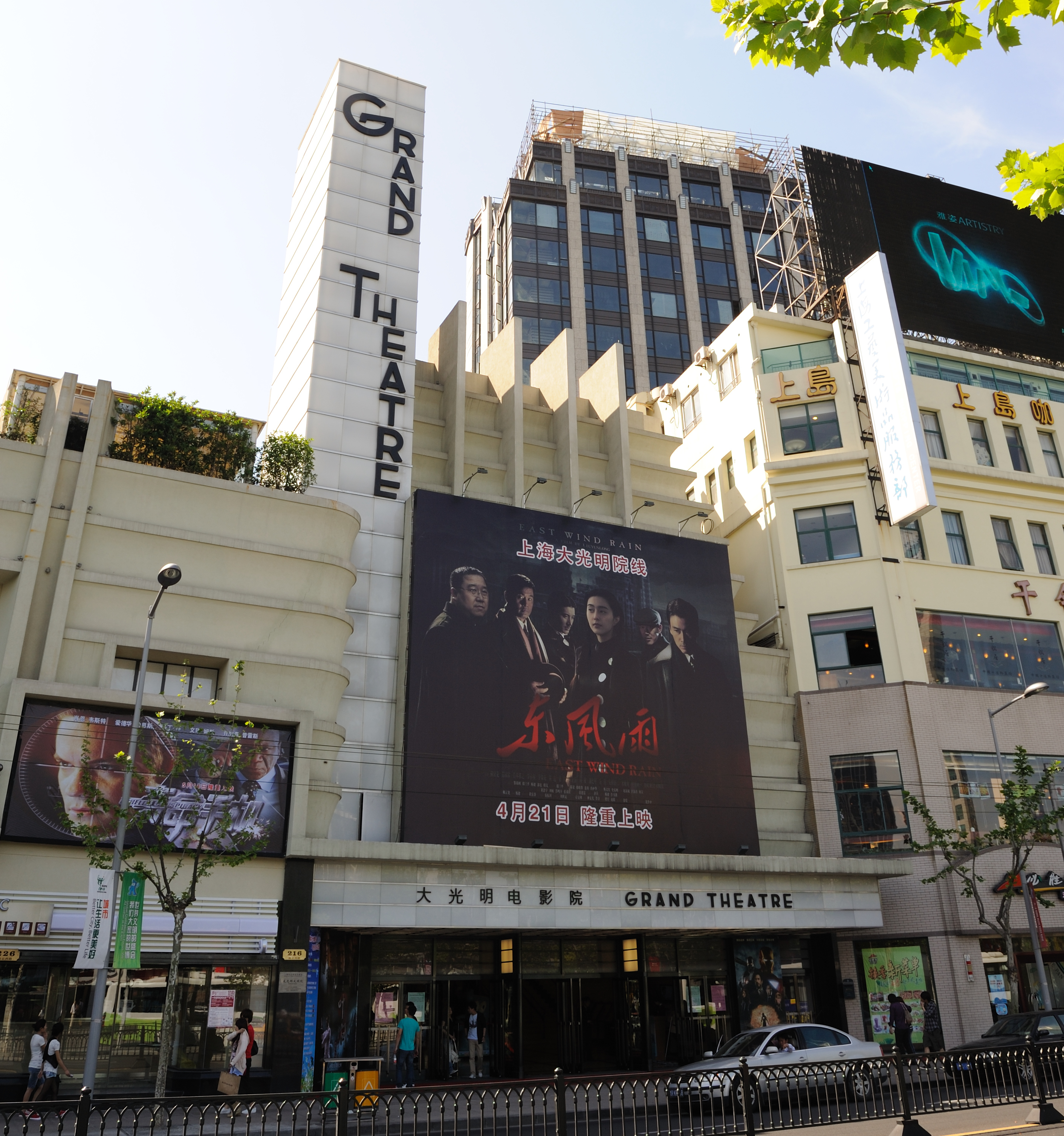
- The building's exterior in 2010
- Interactive map of Grand Cinema
- Full name: Dàguāngmíng Diànyǐngyuàn
- Address: 216 West Nanjing Road
- Location: Shanghai
- Coordinates: 31.2349°N 121.4668°E
- Type: Theatre

Construction
- Opened: 1933
- Architect: László Hudec

The Grand Theatre (Chinese: 大光明电影院; pinyin: Dàguāngmíng Diànyǐngyuàn), also known as the Grand Cinema, is an historic theatre located at 216 West Nanjing Road in Shanghai's Huangpu District, in China.

== Description and history ==
The theatre was designed by Ladislav Hudec and completed in 1933.

In 2013, Time Out Shanghai said of the venue: "Known to foreigners as 'the best cinema of the Far East', the Grand Cinema was frequented by Shanghai's glitterati in its 1930s heyday ... [It] was completed in 1933 and was the height of technological innovation – each seat had a translation system installed so that the Chinese audience could enjoy the foreign-language films through individual earpieces ... Now it's still great for getting a '20s and '30s Art Deco fix, from wrought iron railings to the up-lit stuccos, lashings of Italian marble and the signature font on the public signs. Though there are six screens, the biggest is Screen One (which you can enter through either 'odd' or 'even' entrances), split into two tiers of 1,554 seats."

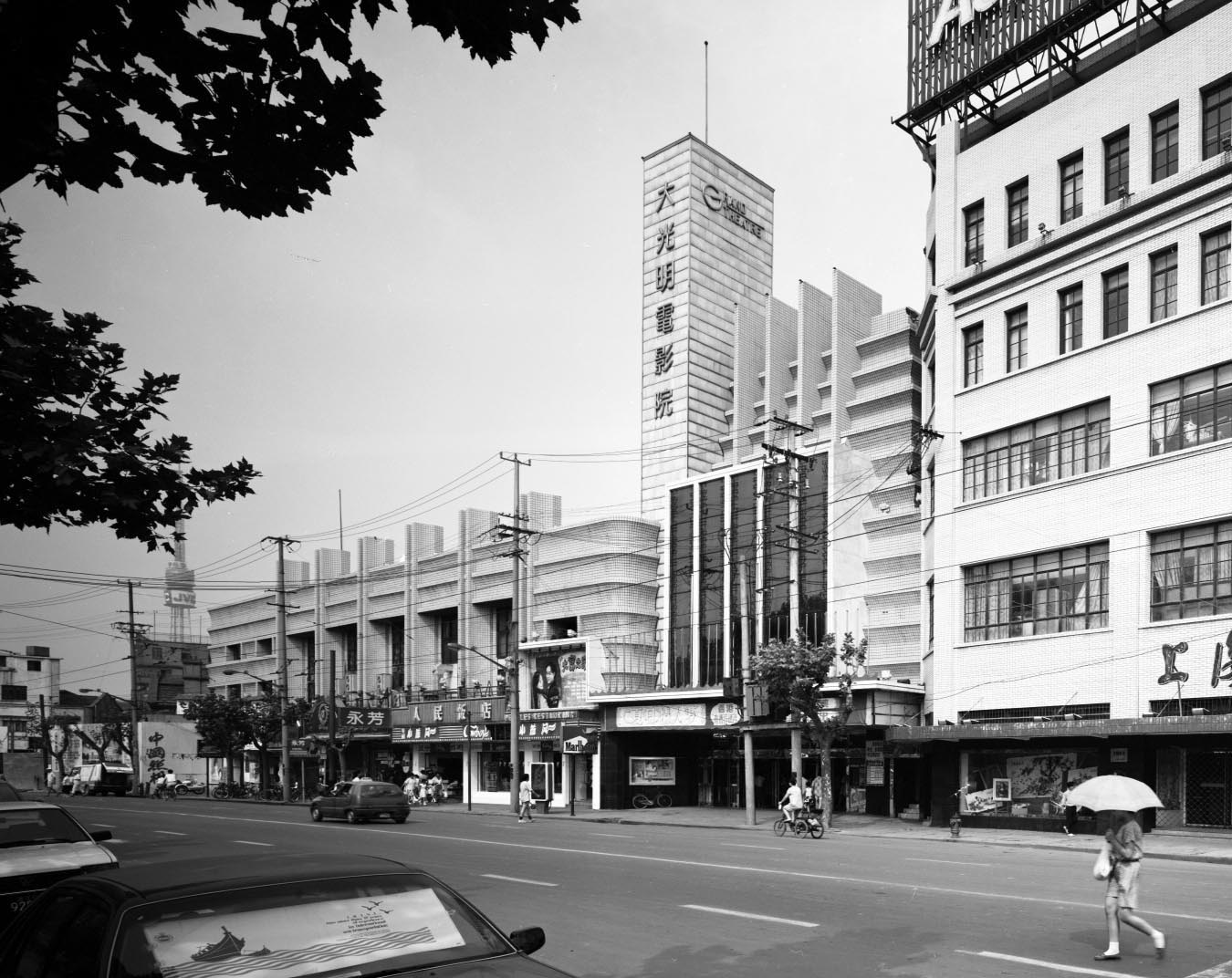
The Grand Theatre

The cinema has a gallery (Chinese: 大剧院画廊; lit. 'grand cinema gallery') which shows the old photos and memorabilia of the cinema.
