= Wukang Mansion =

Historic building in Shanghai, China

- 武康大楼
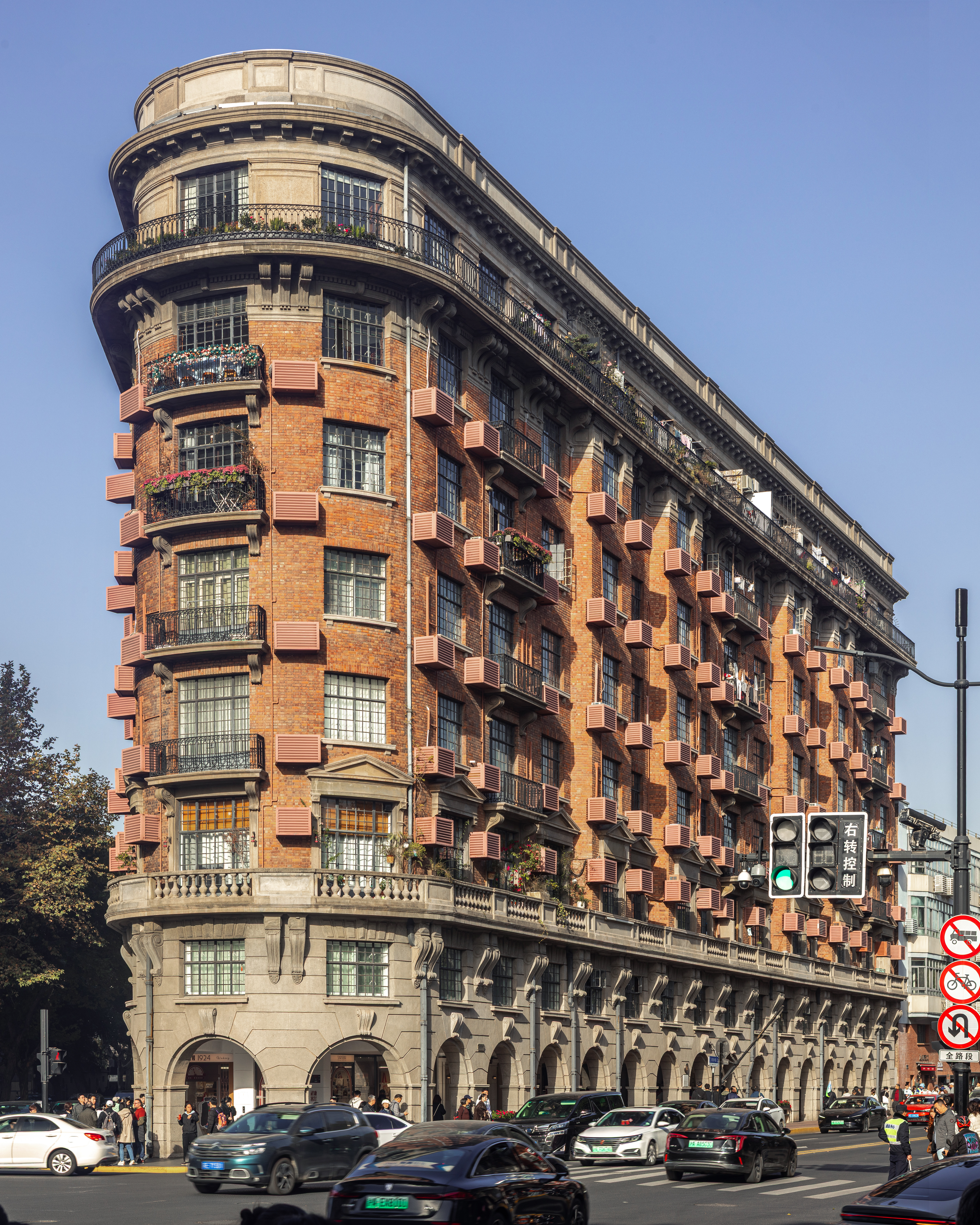
- Wukang Mansion with Wukang Road to the left and Middle Huaihai Road to the right in 2025.
- Interactive map of the Wukang Mansion area
- Former names: Normandie Apartments

General information
- Type: Apartment
- Architectural style: French Renaissance
- Location: Xuhui District, Shanghai, 1836–1858 Middle Huaihai Road, China
- Coordinates: 31.2045°N 121.4383°E
- Inaugurated: 1924

Height
- Height: 30 m (98 ft)

Technical details
- Floor count: 8
- Floor area: 9,275 m^{2} (99,840 sq ft)

Design and construction
- Architect: László Hudec

The Wukang Mansion or Wukang Building (Chinese: 武康大楼), formerly known as the Normandie Apartments or International Savings Society Apartments, is a protected historic apartment building in the former French Concession area of Shanghai. It was designed by the Hungarian-Slovak architect László Hudec and completed in 1924. The building has been the residence of many celebrities.

== Location ==
The building is located at the southern end of Wukang Road (formerly Route Ferguson), on the corner with Middle Huaihai Road (formerly Avenue Joffre), in Shanghai's Xuhui District. It is in the western part of the former French Concession area of the city. The address of the building is 1836–1858 Middle Huaihai Road.

== Architecture ==
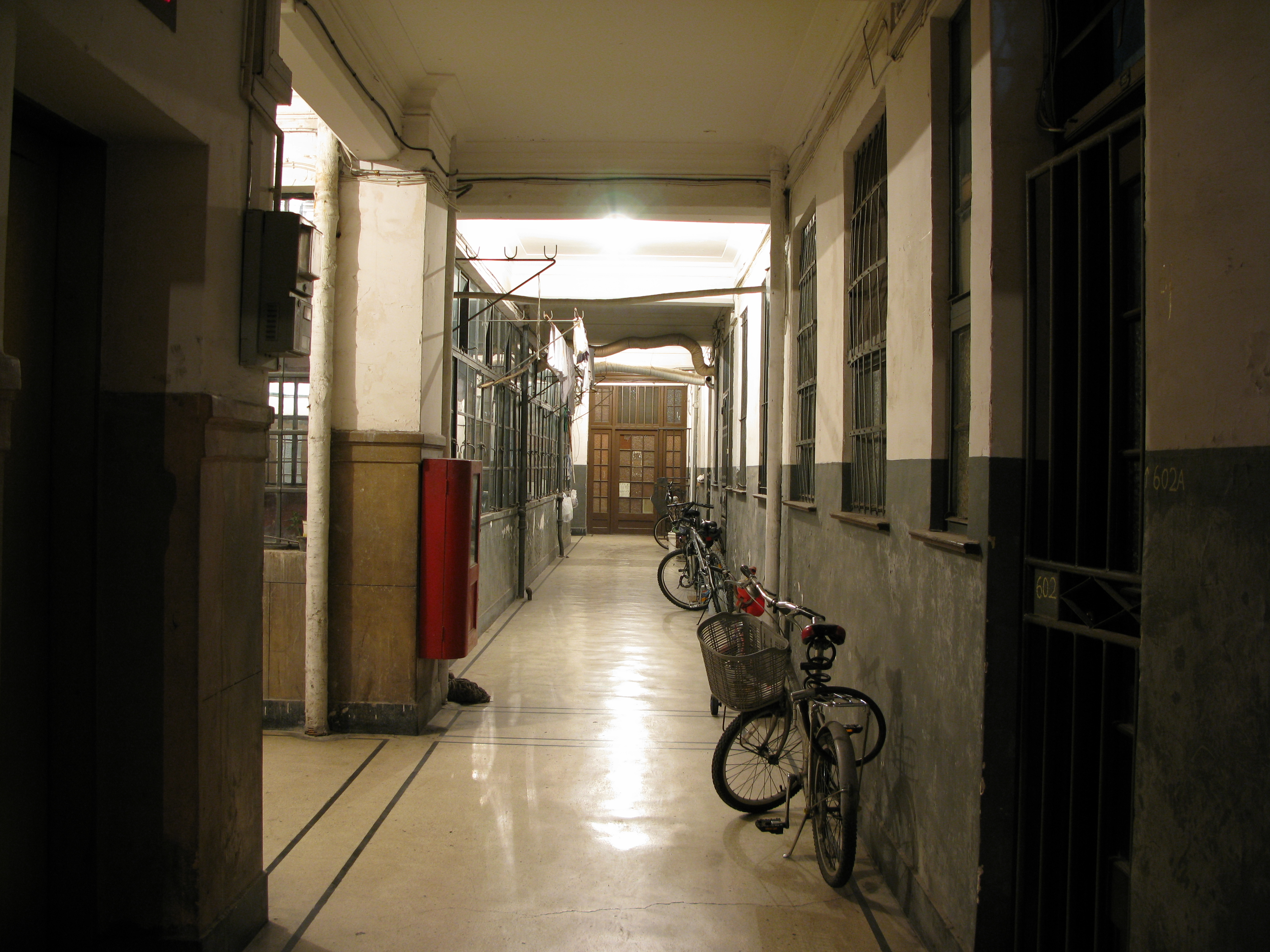
Hallway on the sixth floor of the building.

Completed in 1924, the eight-storey building was designed by the renowned Hungarian-Slovak architect László Hudec (1893–1958), who designed many landmarks in Shanghai. It is in the French Renaissance style and is the oldest veranda-style apartment building in Shanghai. There's an urban legend that the name was to commemorate Normandie, a World War I-era battleship. However no such battleship served in WWI in the French Navy. The building can be visually interpreted as a ship from one direction. The unusual wedge-shape of the building is reminiscent of the Flatiron Building in New York City.

The concrete building is 30 metres (98 ft) tall, occupies a land area of 1,580 square metres (17,000 sq ft), and has a floor area of 9,275 square metres (99,840 sq ft). There were originally 63 apartments, 30 servants' quarters, and three elevators.

== History ==
Originally built for Western employees of companies based in the foreign concessions, the building was bought by Kung Ling-wei, daughter of the wealthy banker H. H. Kung, in 1942. Kung moved into the building, which also became popular with many celebrities of Shanghai, centre of China's film industry during the Republic of China era. Residents included famous actors and actresses Wu Yin, Wang Renmei, Qin Yi, Zhao Dan, Sun Daolin, Wang Wenjuan, Shangguan Yunzhu, and actor/director Zheng Junli. Sun Daolin lived in the building for 30 years with his wife Wang Wenjuan, until his death in 2007. Soong Ching-ling, the widow of President Sun Yat-sen, lived opposite the building across Huaihai Road. Her home is now open to the public as the Soong Ching-ling Memorial Residence.

The former Normandie Apartments was renamed in 1953 to Wukang Mansion after the street it is on. During the Cultural Revolution (1966–1976), the Red Guards renamed the building Anti-Revisionist Tower, but local residents referred to it as "The Diving Board" because of the dozens of suicides by intellectuals and others who were persecuted as "state enemies".

Wukang Mansion is one of Shanghai's historic buildings under municipal protection. In 2008 it was restored by the government of Xuhui District.

It appears in "Death at the Wukang Mansion" in Dear Chrysanthemums (Scribner, 2023), a novel in stories by writer, poet, translator, and musician Fiona Sze-Lorrain.

== See also ==
- List of historic buildings in Shanghai
- Normandie Hotel
