= László Hudec =

Hungarian-Slovakian architect (1893–1958)

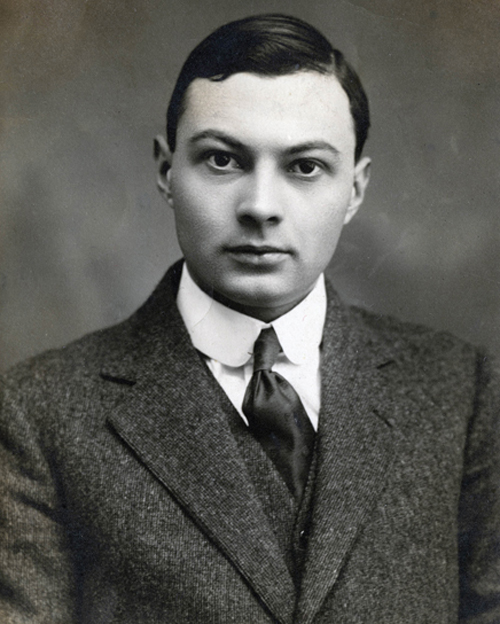
- Born: January 8, 1893; Besztercebánya, Austria-Hungary (today Banská Bystrica, Slovakia)
- Died: October 26, 1958 (aged 65); Berkeley, California, United States
- Other name: Ladislav/László/Ladislaus/Ladislaw Hudec
- Citizenship: Hungarian (1893-1921); Czechoslovak (1921-1941); Hungarian (1941-)
- Education: Budapest University
- Occupation: Architect
- Spouse: Gizella Mayer
- Buildings: Park Hotel Shanghai (more...)

László Ede Hudec or Ladislav Hudec (Hungarian: Hugyecz László Ede) (Besztercebánya, Austria-Hungary (now Banská Bystrica, Slovakia) January 8, 1893 – Berkeley, October 26, 1958), Chinese name Wu Dake (Chinese: 鄔達克), was a Hungarian–Slovak born architect, active in Shanghai from 1918 to the 1940s. He was responsible for some of the city's most notable and inventive architectural landmarks, particularly the Park Hotel, at 22 floors, the tallest in East Asia, and inspired by New York Art Deco skyscrapers. He also designed the German Expressionist inspired Baptist Publications and Christian Literature Society Building, the Art Deco Grand Theatre, and the Streamlined D. V. Woo House ("Green House"), probably the grandest and most up to date house of the 1930s.

== Biography ==
Hudec was born in 1893 in Besztercebánya, Austria-Hungary (now Banská Bystrica in Slovakia). His father, György Hugyecz was a wealthy Magyarized (Note: Originally Juraj Hudec, he changed his Slovak name "Hudec" to the Hungarian form "Hugyecz" in 1890. (Kaboš, Ladislav. "The man who changed Shanghai". Who is L.E.Hudec.)) Slovak contracter-builder, designer and restorer, born in the nearby village of Alsómicsinye (now Dolná Mičiná), while his mother, Paula Skultéty was an ethnic Hungarian from Kassa (now Košice). He studied architecture at Budapest University from 1911 to 1914. As a patriot, Hudec volunteered to join the Austro-Hungarian Army after outbreak of World War I, but was captured by the Russian Army in 1916 and was sent to a prison camp in Siberia. While being transferred, he jumped from a train near the Chinese border and made his way to Shanghai, where he joined the American architectural office R. A. Curry in 1918.

In 1922, he married Gisella Meyer, who had been born in Shanghai to a German father and a Scottish mother, and the couple soon had three children. While still in the Curry office he is credited with a number of designs including a mansion, a school, and the prestigious American Club.

In 1925, he opened his own practice, and was responsible for at least 100 projects up to 1941. His work in the 1920s was largely in the classical or other revival styles. He made a number of trips to Europe including Hungary and Germany, and the United States. From 1930 some designs were in variations of Art Deco, influenced by American practice, and 1920s German Expressionist architecture. The Park Hotel is particularly influenced by American skyscrapers, with a stepped top reminiscent of the American Radiator Building, whereas the Sieh Yih Chapel has clear links to 1920s German churches, for instance those by Dominikus Bohm.

Hudec's masterpiece is usually considered to be the 22-storey Park Hotel, on Nanjing Road across from Shanghai Racecourse. Designed in 1929 and completed in 1934, it was reputed to be the tallest building in East Asia at the time, and remained the tallest in the city until the 1980s. It has long been a local landmark, and remains a popular symbol of interwar Shanghai.

The 1937 D.V. Woo Tongwen house is considered one of his most notable designs, using curving streamlined forms all tiled in green. It featured four floors of accommodation, and many luxury technical features, such as ducted heating.

After the value of silver collapsed in 1935, and the Japanese invaded China and surrounded Shanghai in 1937, new projects almost dried up.

After the Munich Agreement in 1938 Hudec lost his Czechoslovak citizenship and applied to become Hungarian citizen. In 1941 he obtained a Hungarian passport and was appointed Honorary Consul of Hungary in Shanghai.

After leaving Shanghai in 1947, Hudec moved to Lugano and later to Rome. In 1950 he moved to Berkeley where he gave lectures in San Fransciso as well as at the University of California. He died from a heart-attack in 1958. In 1970 his remains were buried in an evangelical cemetery in Banská Bystrica.

Since the mid 2000s, his work has been rediscovered and featured in various publications in both English and Chinese.

== Buildings in Shanghai ==
Listed by date of completion, dates from Shanghai Hudec Architecture (2013).

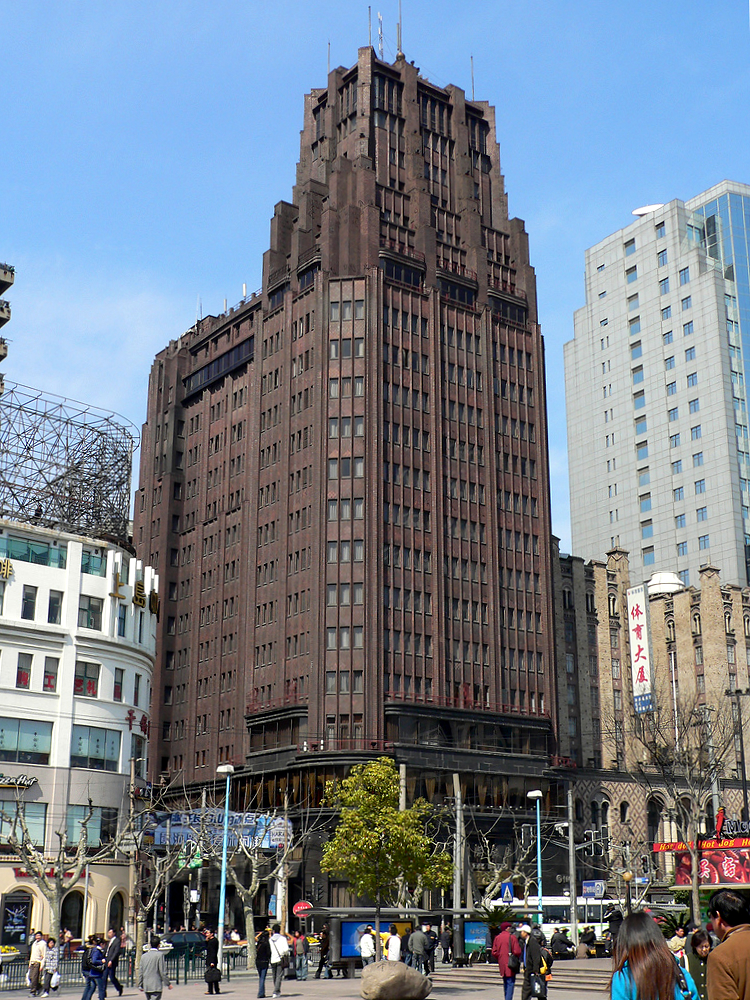
- Park Hotel
  1920 He Dong Mansion, now Shanghai Lexicographical Publishing House.
- 1922 Lan Huade Hall (also known as the Social Hall of the Chinese and Western Girls' School or Haihan Hall).
- 1925 American Club, Shanghai
- 1925 Country Hospital
- 1926 Normandie Apartments (Wukang Building)
- 1926 Margaret Williamson Hospital (Red House Hospital)
- 1926 Hong En Hospital (Country Hospital)
- 1926 The Four Banks Savings Association Building (Chinese : 四行儲蓄會大樓 (上海))
- 1927 Chapei Power Station (Chinese: 闸北水电厂)
- 1928 Columbia Circle (Chinese: 哥伦比亚住宅圈), a set of 29 garden villas.
- 1930 Hudec House (Chinese: Wudack Memorial Hall 鄔達克紀念館)
- 1930 Sun Ye House (son of Sun Yat Sen) (Chinese:孙科别墅), now attached to the redeveloped Columbia Country Club, as part of Columbia Circle.
- 1931 Moore Memorial Church (Chinese: 沐恩堂)
- 1931 Avenue Apartments
- 1931 Sieh Yih Chapel (Catholic cemetery chapel)(Chinese: 息焉堂)
- 1932 China Baptist Publication Society and Christian Literature Society Building (Chinese: Zhenguang and Guangxue Buildings 真光广学大楼)
- 1932 German Lutheran Church (Chinese: 上海德国礼拜堂), demolished 1990s.
- 1932 Ding Guitang House (Chinese:汾阳路45号住宅)
- 1933 Grand Theatre
- 1934 Shanghai / Union Brewery
- 1934 Park Hotel Shanghai
- 1937 D.V. Woo House (Wu Tongwen/Green house) (Chinese:吴同文住宅)

== Buildings in Slovakia ==
- SPA chapel of the Queen of Heaven in Vyhne

== Gallery ==
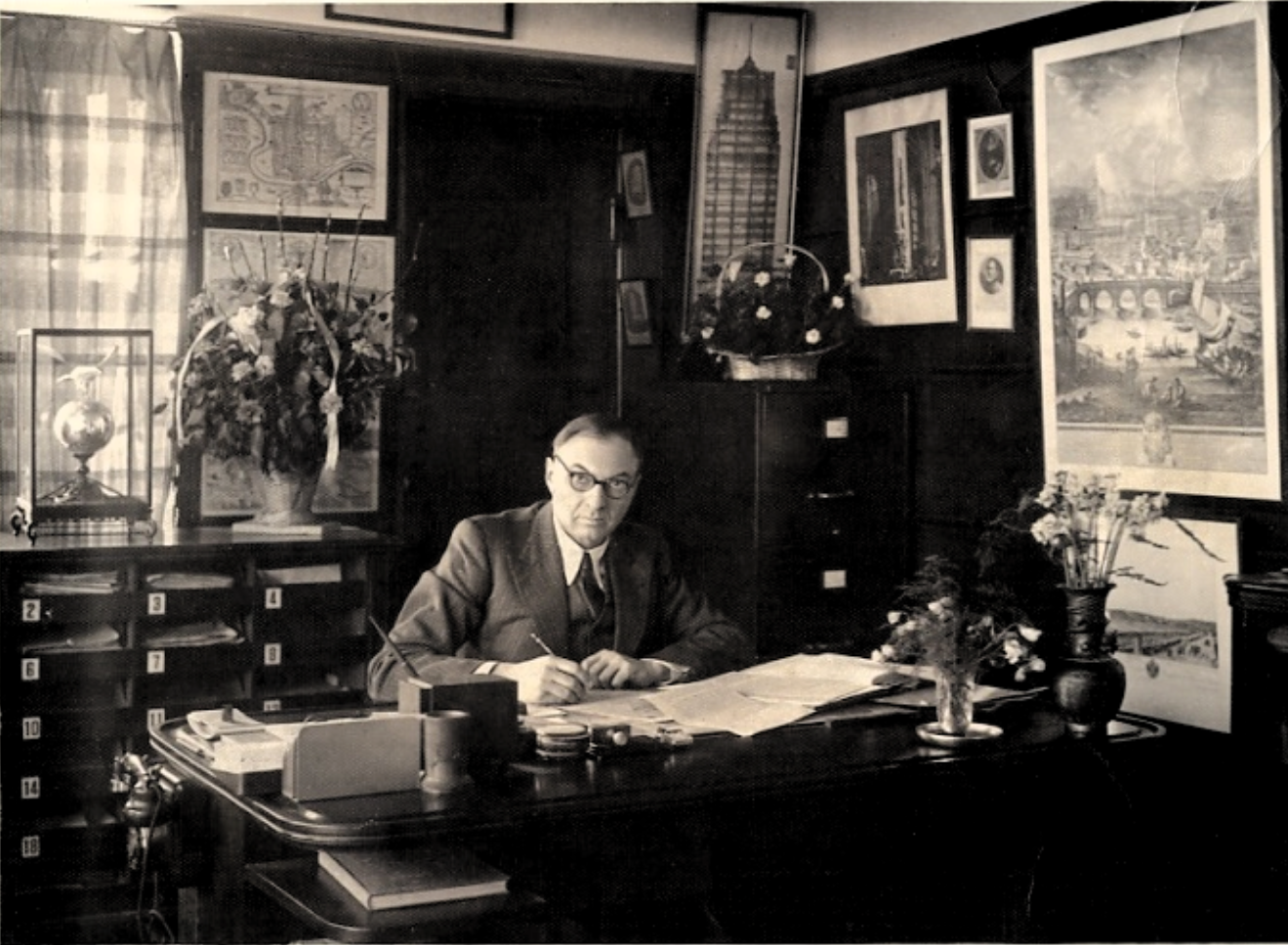
László Hudec c1934

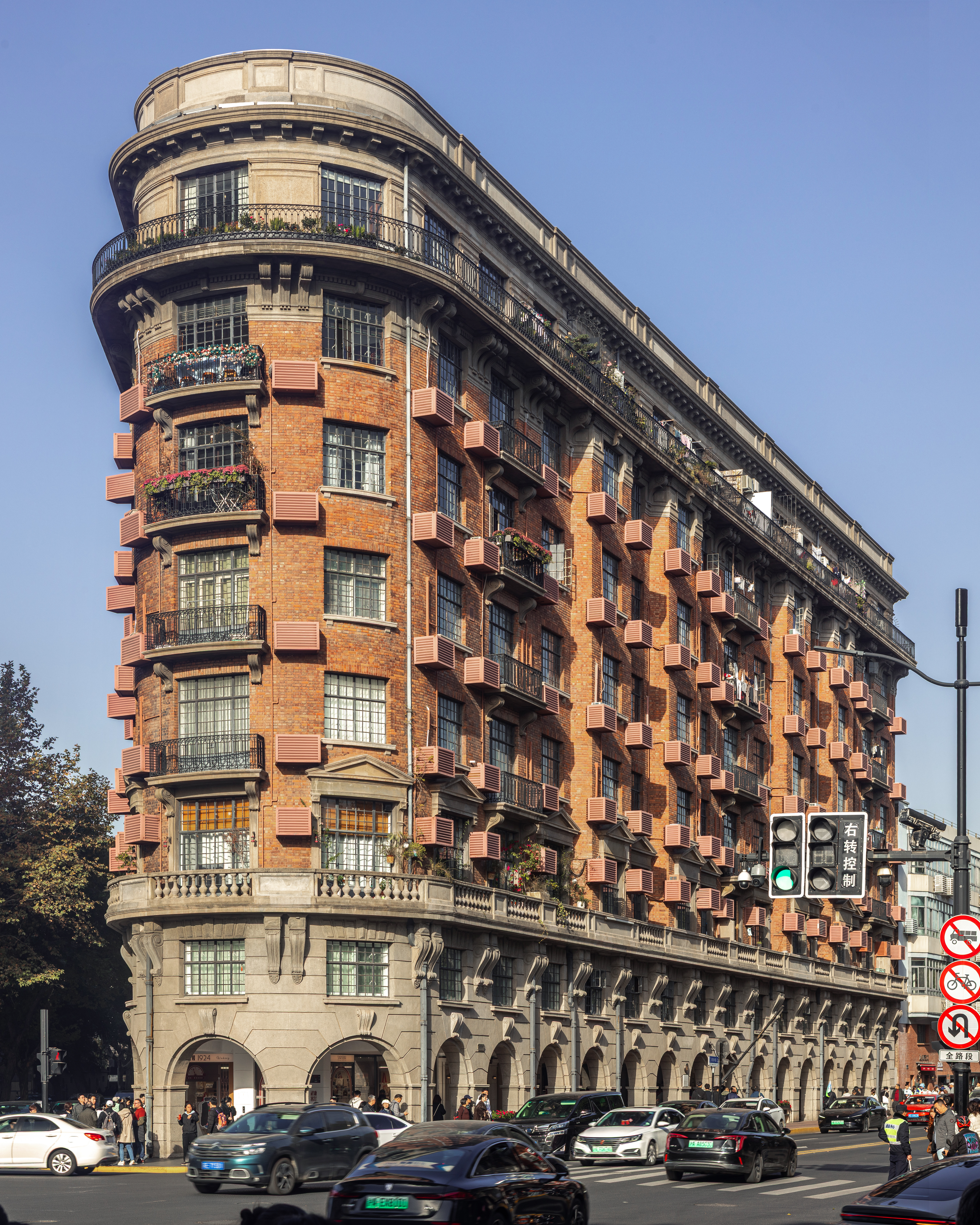
Normandie Apartments

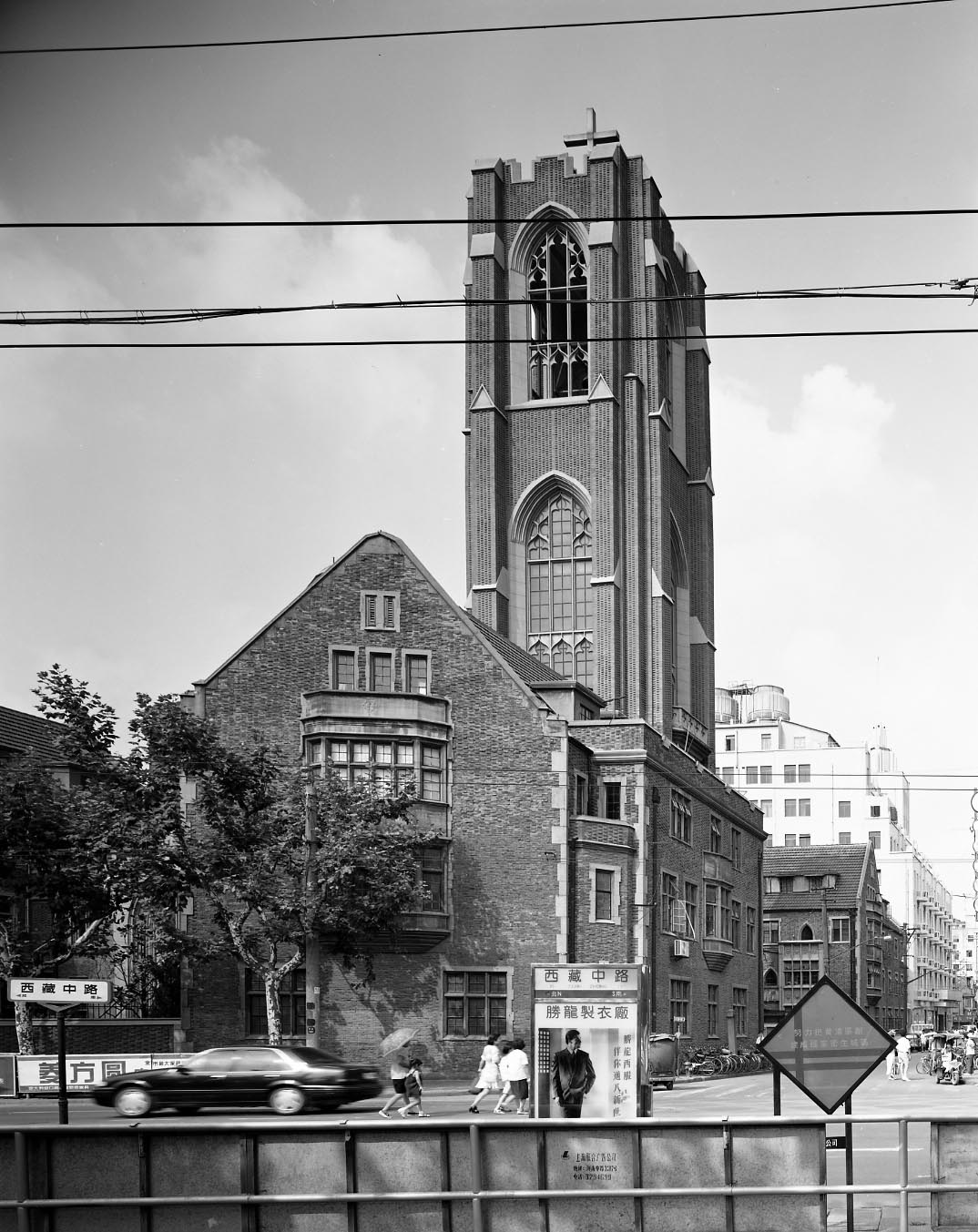
Moore Memorial Church

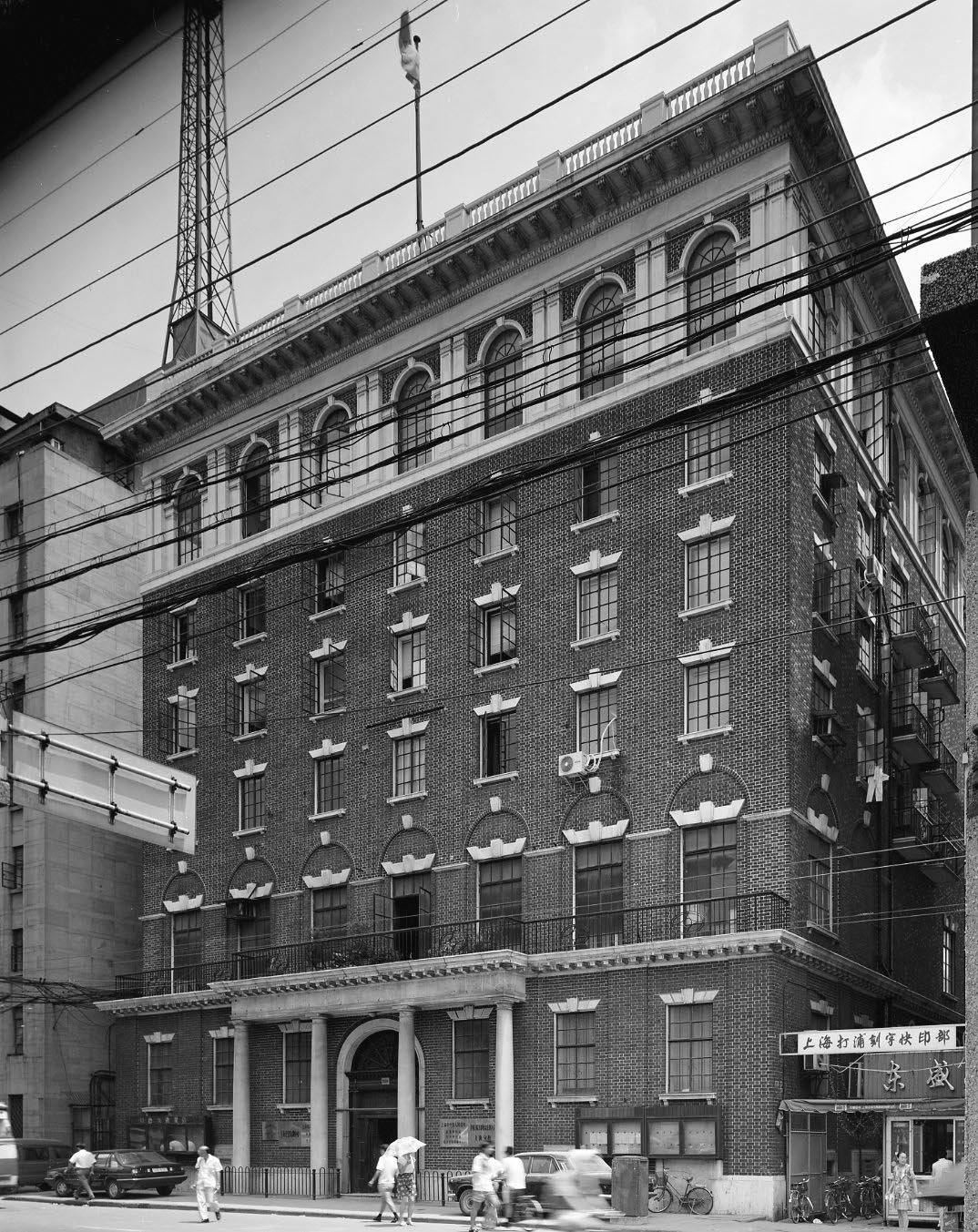
American Club

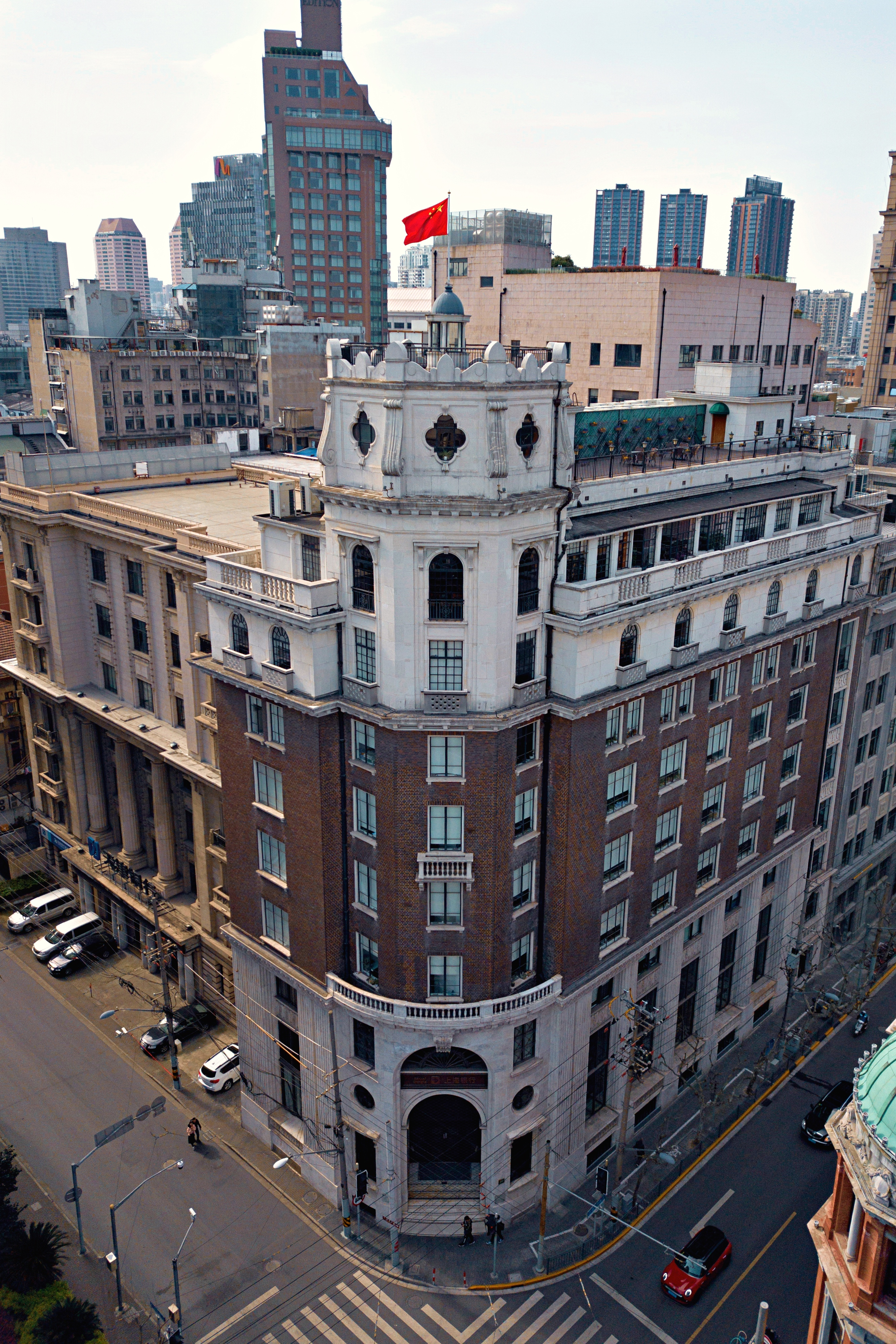
Four Banks Savings Association

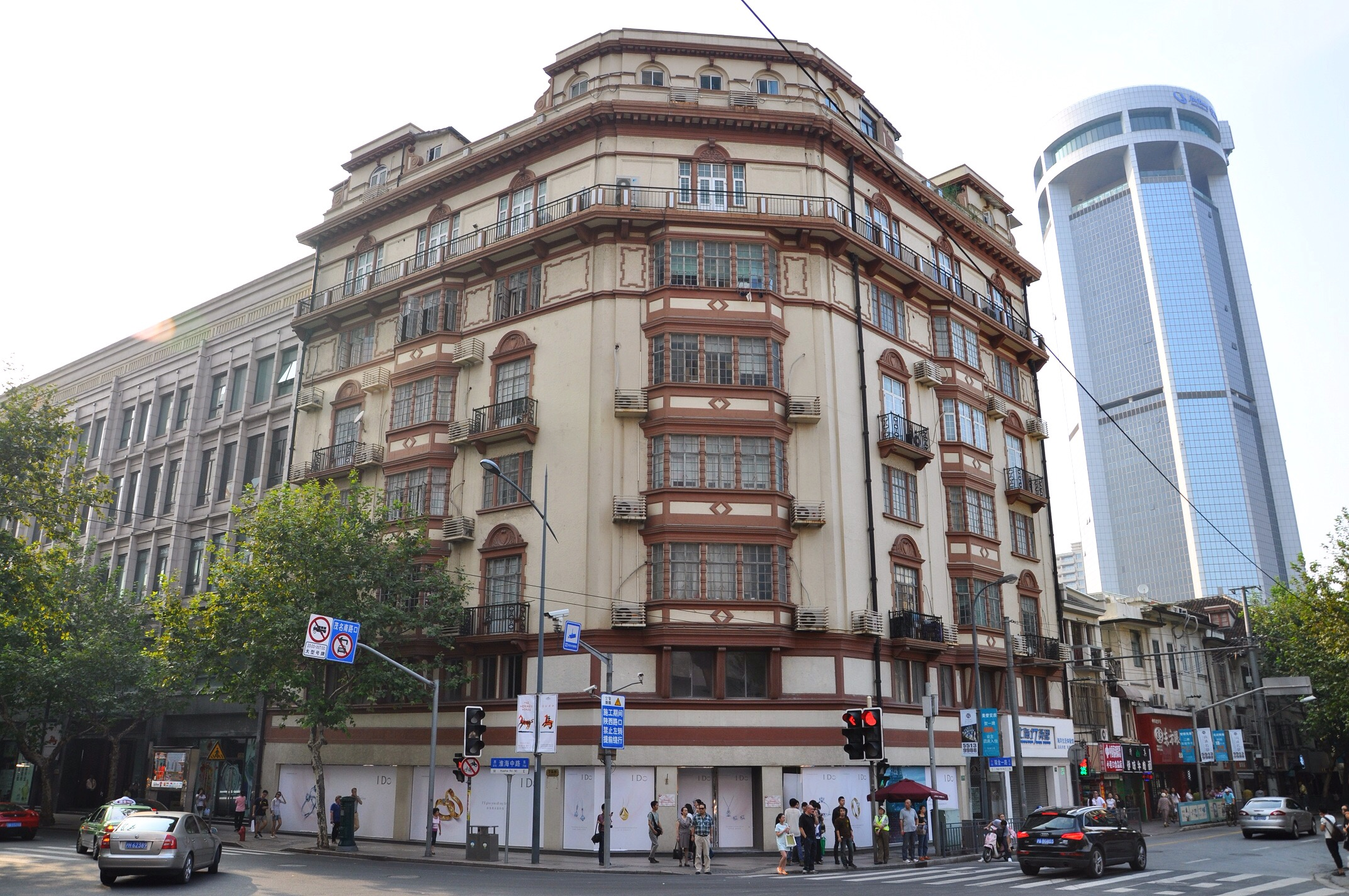
Estrella Apartments

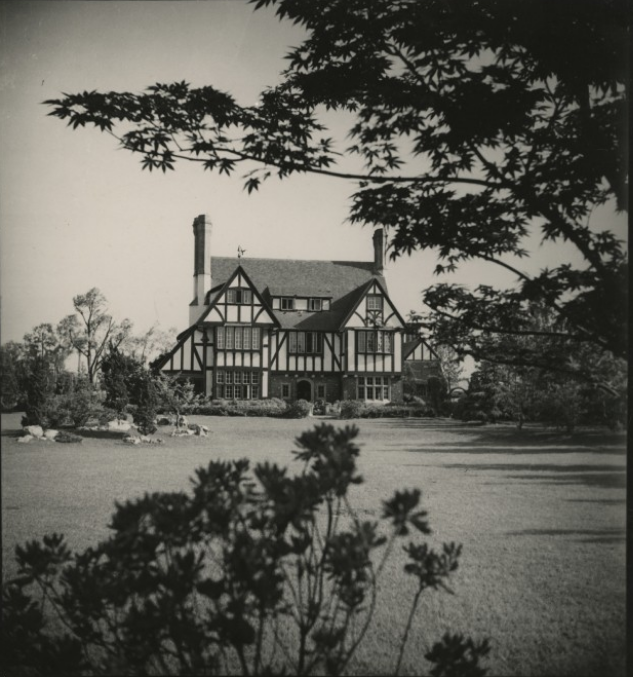
Hudec House in the 1930s

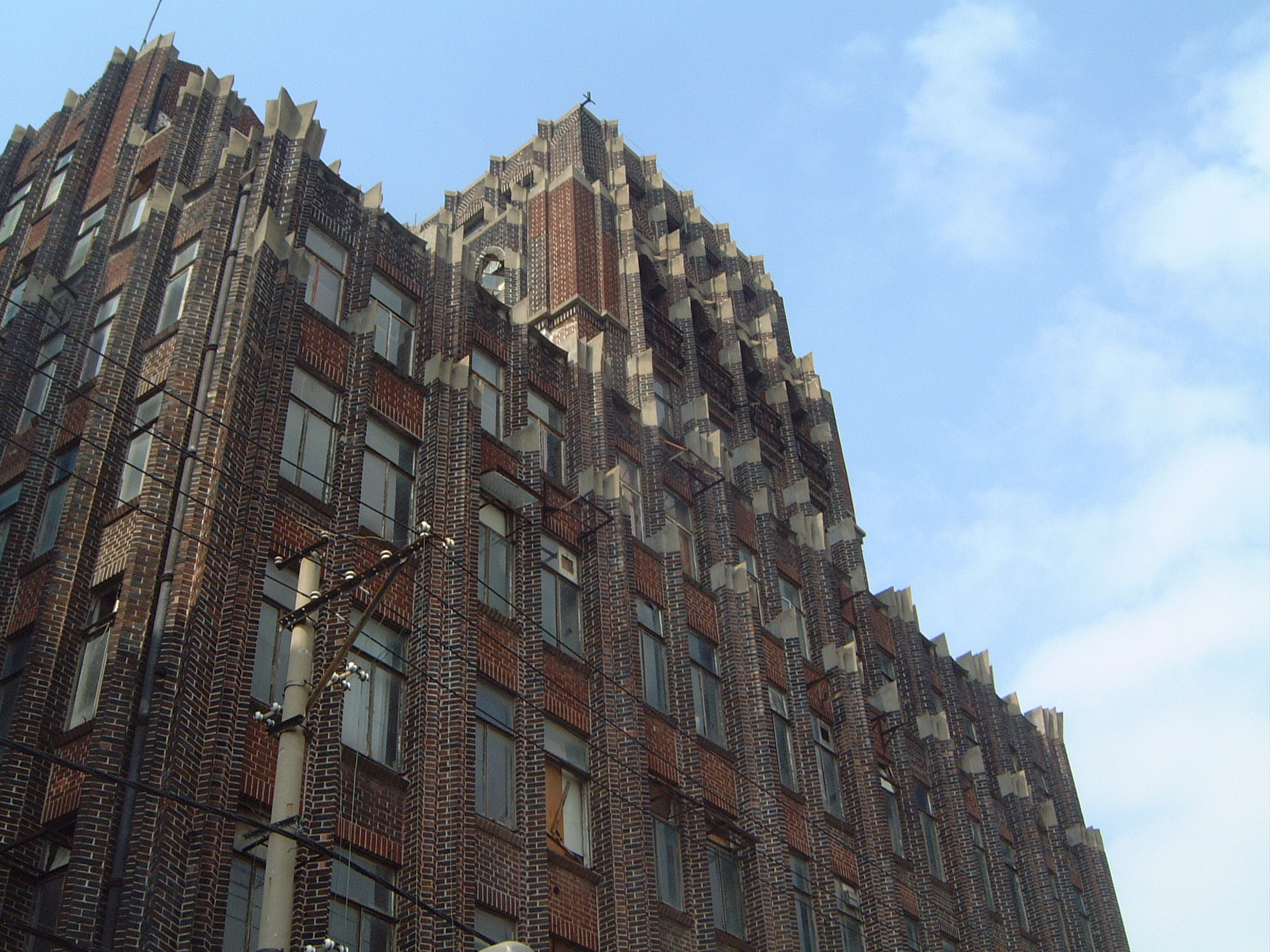
China Baptist and Christian Literature Society Building

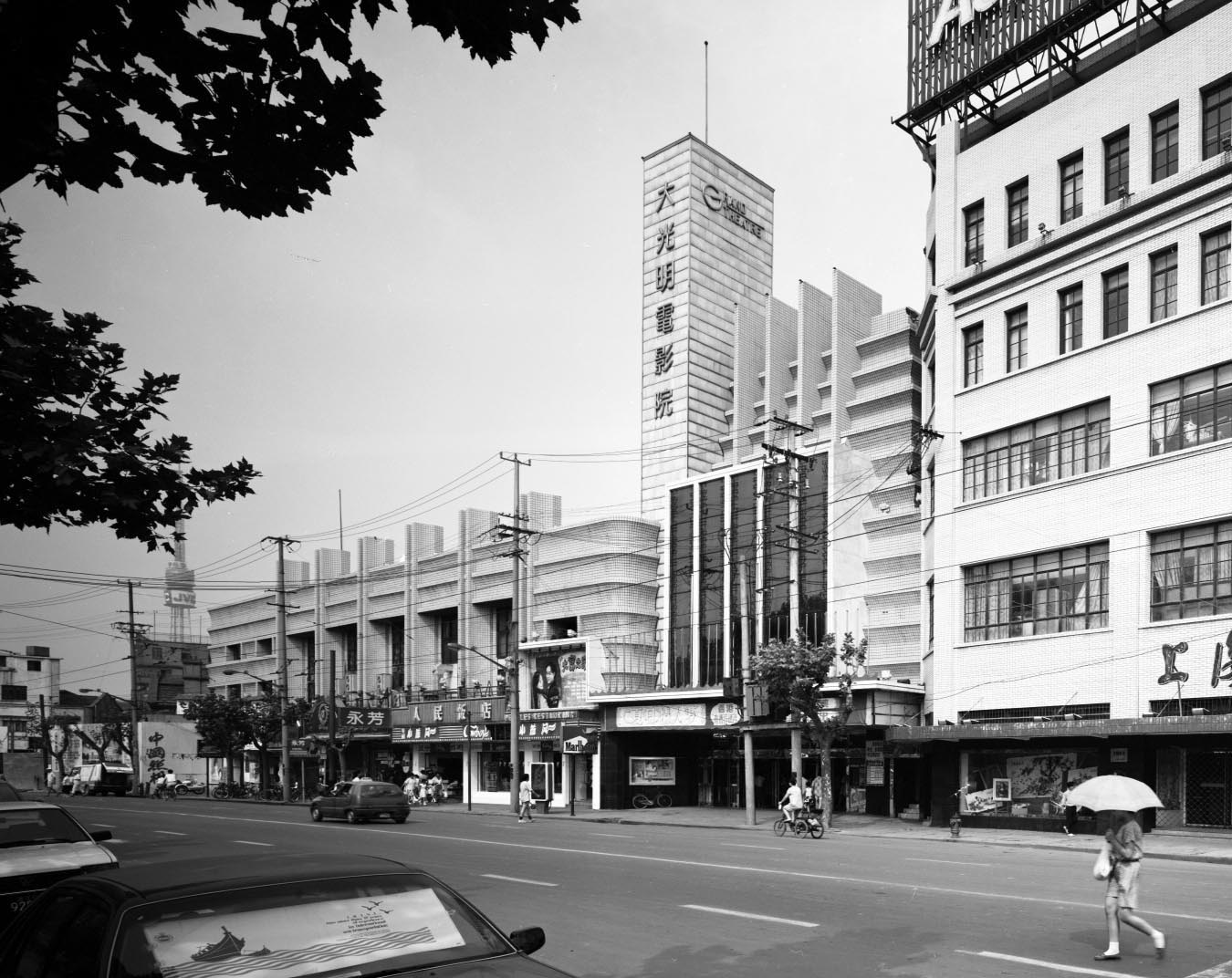
Grand Theatre

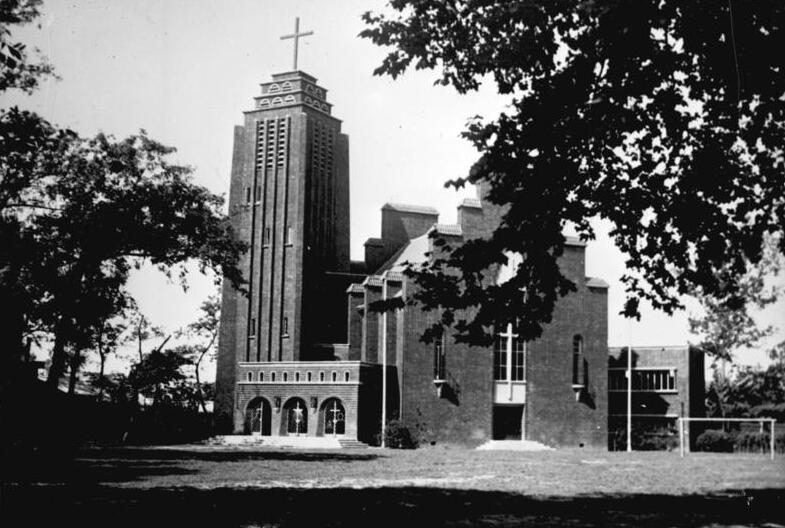
German Church

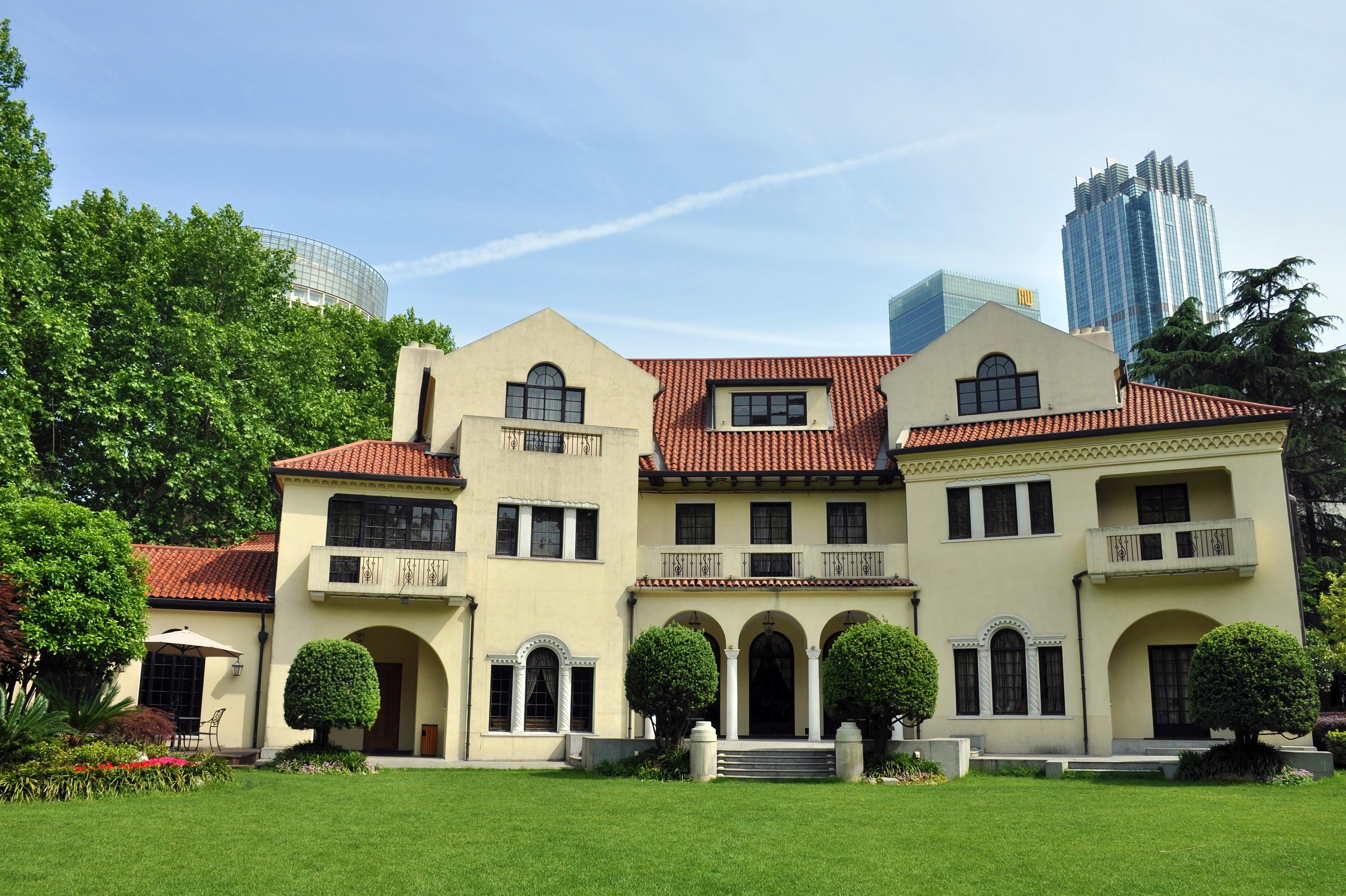
Ding Guitang House

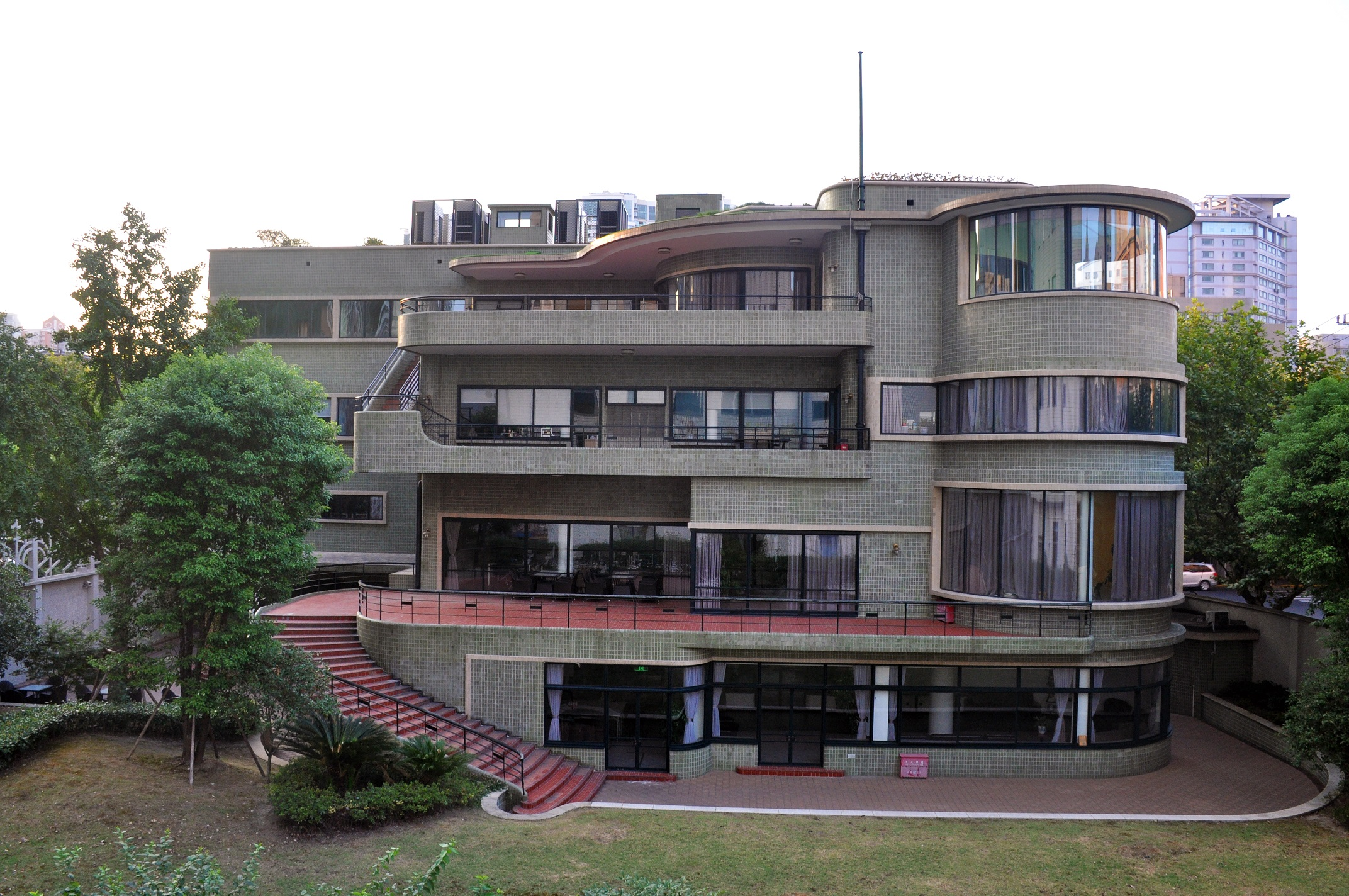
D.V. Woo House
