= Daguangmingdian =

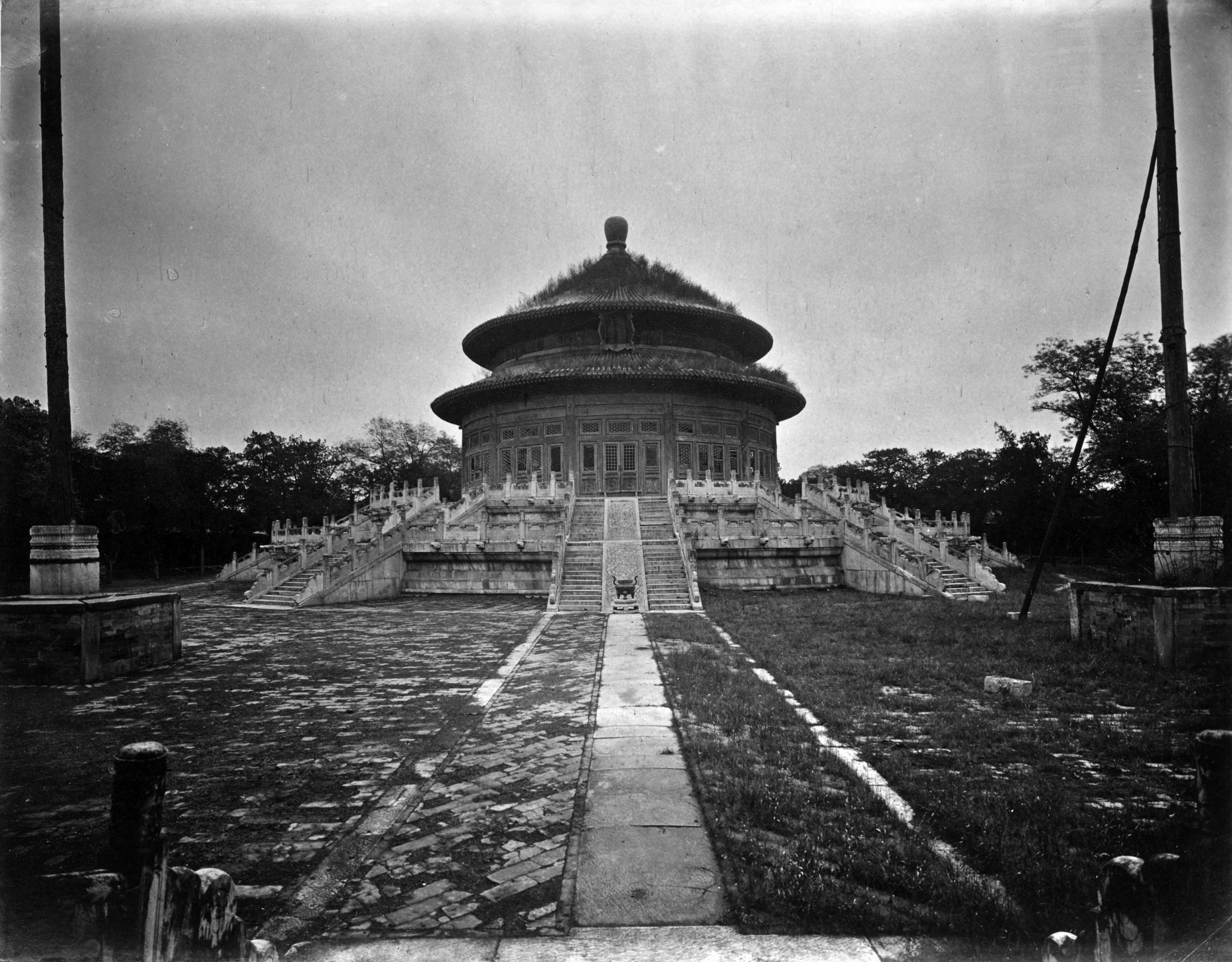

Daguangmingdian or known as Da-guangming-dian, the Great Hall of the Brightness (Chinese: 大光明殿; pinyin: Dà guāng míng diàn) was a building near the Forbidden city, Beijing. It was a Taoist temple as well as the temple for the Qing royal family.

The current Guangming Hutong is named after this building.

The temple is burned down in 1900 during the Boxer Uprising and the subsequent Boxer war.
