= Ba Jin =

Chinese anarchist writer (1904–2005)

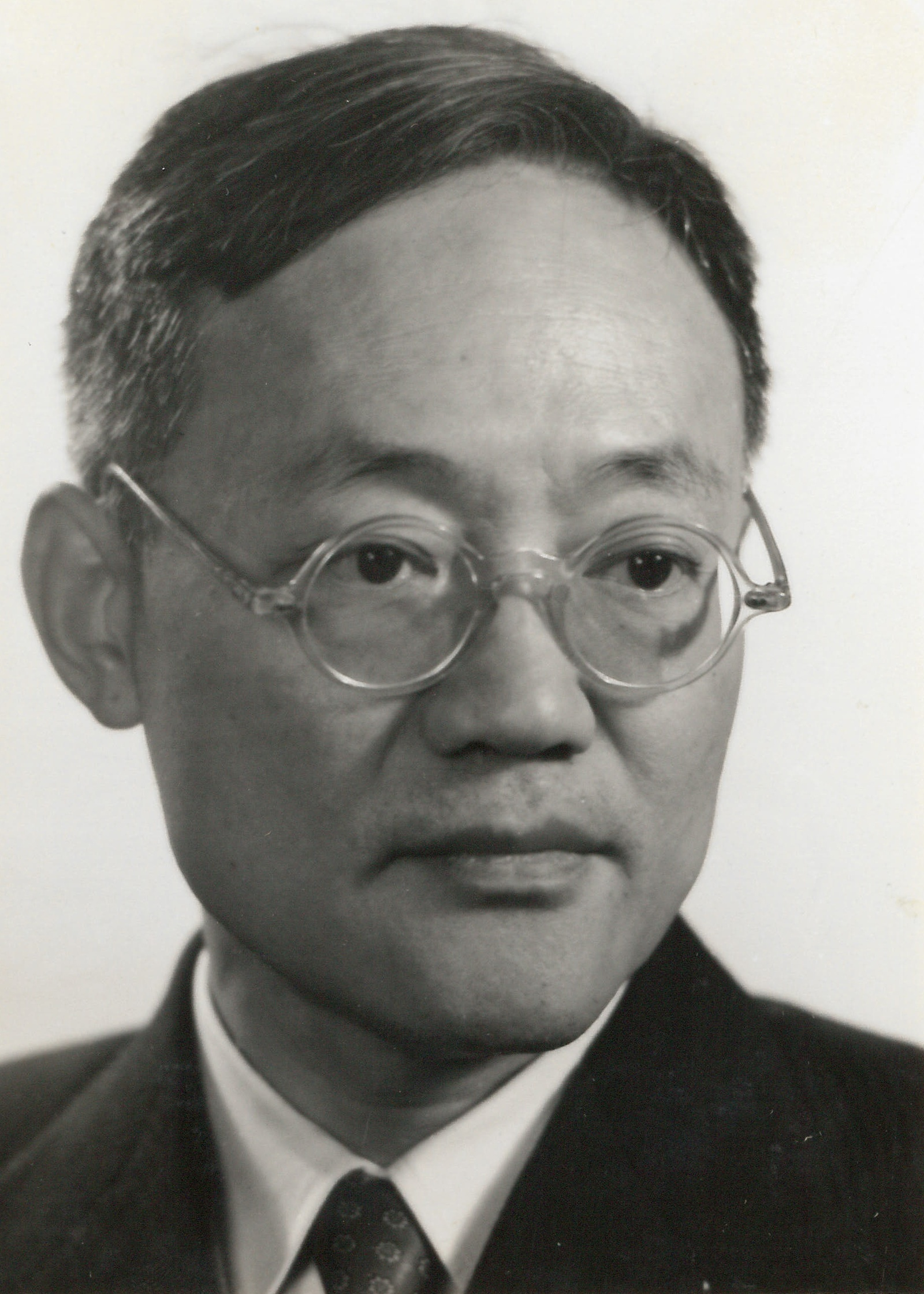
- Ba Jin in Berlin, 1956
- Born: Li Yaotang / Li Feigan; 25 November 1904; Chengdu, Sichuan, Qing China
- Died: 17 October 2005 (aged 100); Shanghai, China
- Occupation: Novelist
- Spouse: Xiao Shan (m. 1936; died 1972)
- Children: Li Xiaolin; Li Xiao
- Writing career
- Pen name: Ba Jin
- Notable works: Turbulent Stream: Family, Spring, and Autumn; Love Trilogy: Fog, Rain, and Lightning
- Notable awards: 1983: Legion of Honour; 1990: Fukuoka Prize (special prize)

Ba Jin
- Chinese: 巴金
Transcriptions
Standard Mandarin
- Hanyu Pinyin: Bā Jīn
- Wade–Giles: Pa1 Chin1
- IPA: [pá tɕín]
Yue: Cantonese
- Yale Romanization: Bāa Gām
- Jyutping: Baa1 Gam1
- IPA: [pa˥ kɐm˥]
Southern Min
- Hokkien POJ: Pa Kim

Alternative Chinese name
- Traditional Chinese: 李堯棠
- Simplified Chinese: 李尧棠
Transcriptions
Standard Mandarin
- Hanyu Pinyin: Lǐ Yáotáng
- Wade–Giles: Li3 Yao2-t'ang2
- IPA: [lì jǎʊ tʰǎŋ]

Li Yaotang (Chinese: 李堯棠; pinyin: Lǐ Yáotáng; 25 November 1904 – 17 October 2005), better known by his pen name Ba Jin (Chinese: 巴金; pinyin: Bā Jīn) or his courtesy name Li Feigan (Chinese: 李芾甘; pinyin: Lǐ Fèigān), was a Chinese anarchist, translator, and writer. In addition to his impact on Chinese literature, he also wrote three original works in Esperanto, and as a political activist he wrote Family.

== Name ==
He was born as Li Yaotang, with alternate name Li Feigan or Li Pei Kan (in Wade–Giles). The first word of his pen name may have been taken from Ba Embo, his classmate who committed suicide in Paris, which was admitted by himself, or from the first syllable of the surname of the Russian anarchist Mikhail Bakunin; and the last character of which is the Chinese equivalent of the last syllable of Russian anarchist Peter Kropotkin (克鲁泡特金, Ke-lu-pao-te-jin).

== Biography ==
On November 25, 1904, Li Yaotang was born in Chengdu, Sichuan Province, into a wealthy Li family. The family's wealth came mainly from the land acquired by his grandfather and father when they were officials, and Li Yaotang sometimes described his family as a "typical landlord's family". In 1919, Ba read Kropotkin's An Appeal to the Young and converted to anarchism.

Ba Jin left Chengdu to attend school in eastern China in 1923, and then traveled to France to study in 1927. It was partly owing to boredom that Ba Jin began to write his first novel, Miewang 灭亡 ("Destruction"). In France, Ba Jin continued his anarchist activism, translating many anarchist works, including Kropotkin's Ethics, into Chinese, which was mailed back to Shanghai's anarchist magazines for publication.

During the Cultural Revolution, Ba Jin was heavily persecuted as a counter-revolutionary. In his memoir, Ba Jin also wrote about his own participation in the persecution of friends and acquaintances. He asked that a Cultural Revolution Museum be set up in 1981. Ba Jin stated that such museums could include "concrete and real objects" and reconstruct "striking scenes" of the Cultural Revolution in order to engrave the upheaval of the period in Chinese national memory. In his view, passing on to later generations memories of this "catastrophic era" would help avoid history repeating itself. Ba Jin did not attempt to implement his proposal for a Cultural Revolution museum.

The Shantou Cultural Revolution Museum referenced the influence of Ba Jin on its establishment through displaying a depiction of his at the entrance as well as a quote of his, "Every town in China should establish a museum about the Cultural Revolution."

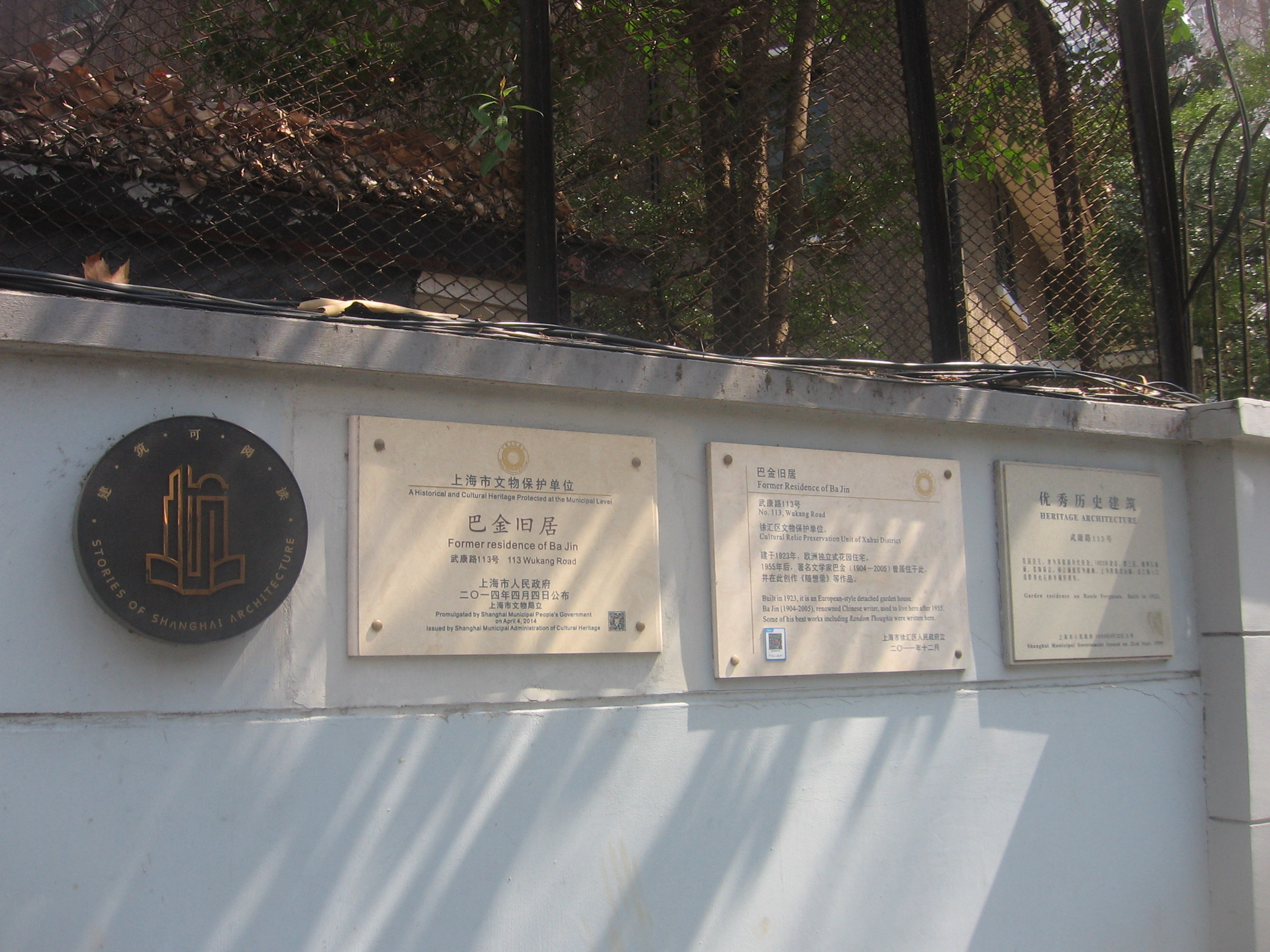
Former Residence of Ba Jin in Shanghai

Some critics of Ba Jin noted that his vision of a Cultural Revolution did not deviate much from the official judgment on the period contained in the 1981 Resolution on Certain Questions in the History of Our Party since the Founding of the People's Republic of China and that he did not propose how to treat the actions and figure of Mao Zedong in such a museum. Other critics contended that Ba Jin's vision privileged the suffering of elites during the Cultural Revolution and ignored the experience of the poor, many of whom remembered the Mao era as when they first received job security and health care, or who may remember the period as a time of simple virtue and close communities.

Ba Jin contributed calligraphy to photographer Yang Kelin's 1995 two volume work, The Cultural Revolution Museum.

Ba Jin's works were heavily influenced by foreign writers, including Émile Zola, Ivan Turgenev, Alexander Herzen, Anton Chekhov, and Emma Goldman.

His married wife since 1944, Xiao Shan, died of cancer in 1972.

Ba Jin suffered from Parkinson's disease beginning in 1983. The illness confined him to Huadong Hospital in Shanghai from 1998. He died in 2005, aged 100.

== Bibliography ==
=== English translations ===
- (1954) Living Amongst Heroes. Beijing: Foreign Language Press.
- (1958) Family. (trans. Sidney Shapiro) Beijing: Foreign Language Press.
- (1959) A battle for life: a full record of how the life of steel worker, Chiu Tsai-kang, was saved in the Shanghai Kwangrze Hospital. Beijing: Foreign Language Press.
- (1978) Cold Nights (trans. Nathan K. Mao and Liu Ts'un-yan) Hong Kong: Chinese University press.
- (1984) Random Thoughts (trans. Germie Barm&ecute). Hong Kong: Joint Publishing Company. (Partial translation of Suizianglu)
- (1988) Selected works of Ba Jin (trans. Sidney Shapiro and Jock Hoe) Beijing: Foreign Language Press. (Includes The Family, Autumn in Spring, Garden of Repose, Bitter Cold Nights)
- (1999) Ward Four: A Novel of Wartime China (trans. Haili Kong and Howard Goldblatt). San Francisco: China Books and Periodicals, Inc.
- (2005) "How to Build a Society of Genuine Freedom and Equality"(1921), "Patriotism and the Road to Happiness for the Chinese"(1921) and "Anarchism and the Question of Practice"(1927) in Anarchism: A Documentary History of Libertarian Ideas, Volume 1: From Anarchy to Anarchism (300CE-1939), ed. Robert Graham. Montreal: Black Rose Books.
- (2012) Ward Four: A Novel of Wartime China (trans. Howard Goldblatt). San Francisco: China Books and Periodicals, Inc. ISBN 9780835100007.

=== Ba Jin stories in collections ===
- Arzybasheff, M. (1927). "Morning Shadows?" in Tales of the Revolution. Tr. Percy Pinkerton. New York Huebsch.
- (1927). "Workingman Shevyrev." in Tales of the Revolution, tr. Percy Pinkerton. New York: Huebsch.

== Works ==
Short story collections

- Vengeance 《复仇》, 1931
- Dog 《狗》, 1931
- Brightness 《光明》, 1932
- The Electric Chair 《电椅》, 1933
- Wiping Cloth 《抹布》, 1933
- The General 《将军》, 1934
- Gods, Ghosts and Men 《神·鬼·人》, 1935
- Sinking 《沉落》, 1936
- The Story of Hair 《发的故事》, 1936
- Thunder 《雷》, 1937
- Resurrection Grass 《还魂草》, 1942
- Little People, Little Events 《小人小事》, 1943
- Heroic Tales 《英雄的故事》, 1953
- Pigs and Chickens 《猪与鸡》, 1959
- Li Da-hai 《李大海》, 1961
- Stories Outside the City, 1992

Children's literature

- The Immortality Pagoda 《长生塔》, 1937
- The Pearl and the Jade Concubine 《明珠和玉姬》, 1957

Novels and novellas

- Destruction 《灭亡》, 1929
- The Dead Sun 《死去的太阳》, 1931
- The "Love" Trilogy 《爱情的三部曲》 (1931–5)
  - Fog 《雾》, 1931
  - Rain 《雨》, 1933
  - Lightning 《电》, 1935
- New Life 《新生》, 1933
- Miners 《砂丁》, 1933
- Germination 《萌芽》, 1933
- A Dream of the Sea 《海的梦》, 1932
- Autumn in Spring 《春天里的秋天》, 1932
- The "Torrents" Trilogy 《激流三部曲》
  - Family 《家》, 1933
  - Spring 《春》, 1938
  - Autumn 《秋》, 1940
- Lina 《利娜》, 1940
- Fires 《火》(in three volumes), 1940–1945
- Stars 《星》(English-Chinese bilingual), 1941
- A Garden of Repose 《憩园》, novella, 1944
- Ward No 4 《第四病室》, 1946
- Cold Nights 《寒夜》, 1947

Autobiography and memoirs

- Ba Jin: An Autobiography 《巴金自传》, 1934
- I Remember 《忆》, 1936
- Thinking Back on Childhood 《童年的回忆》, 1984

Non-fiction

- (coauthor) Anarchism and its Practical Problems 《无政府主义与实际问题》, 1927
- From Capitalism to Anarchism 《从资本主义到安那其主义》, 1930
- A Walk by the Sea 《海行》, 1932
- Travel Notes 《旅途随笔》, 1934
- Droplets of Life 《点滴》, 1935
- Confessions of Living 《生之忏悔》, 1936
- Brief Notes 《短简》, 1937
- I Accuse 《控诉》, 1937
- Dreaming and Drunkenness 《梦与醉》, 1938
- Thoughts and Feelings 《感想》, 1939
- Black Earth 《黑土》, 1939
- Untitled 《无题》, 1941
- Dragons, Tigers and Dogs 《龙·虎·狗》, 1941
- Outside the Derelict Garden 《废园外》, 1942
- Travel Notes 《旅途杂记》, 1946
- Remembering 《怀念》, 1947
- Tragedy of a Still Night 《静夜的悲剧》, 1948
- The Nazi Massacre Factory: Auschwitz 《纳粹杀人工厂—奥斯威辛》, 1951
- Warsaw Festivals: Notes in Poland 《华沙城的节日—波兰杂记》, 1951
- The Consoling Letter and Others 《慰问信及其他》, 1951
- Living Amongst Heroes 《生活书局在英雄们中间》, 1953
- They Who Defend Peace 《保卫和平的人们》, 1954
- On Chekhov 《谈契河夫》, 1955
- Days of Great Joy 《大欢乐的日子》, 1957
- Strong Warriors 《坚强的战士》, 1957
- A Battle for Life 《—场挽救生命的战斗》, 1958
- New Voices: A Collection 《新声集》, 1959
- Friendship: A Collection 《友谊集》, 1959
- Eulogies: A Collection 《赞歌集》, 1960
- Feelings I Can't Express 《倾吐不尽的感情》, 1963
- Lovely by the Bridge 《贤良桥畔》, 1964
- Travels to Dazhai 《大寨行》, 1965
- Ba Jin: New Writings, 1978–1980
- Smorching Smoke 《烟火集》, 1979
- Random Thoughts 《随想录》, 1978–86
- Thinking Back on Writing 《创作回忆录》 1981
- Exploration and Memories 《探索与回忆》, 1982
- Afterwords: A Collection 《序跋集》, 1982
- Remembrance: A Collection 《忆念集》, 1982
- Ba Jin: On Writing 《巴金论创作》, 1983
- Literature: Recollections (with Lao She) 《文学回忆录》 1983
- To Earth to Dust 《愿化泥土》, 1984
- I Accuse: A Collection 《控诉集》, 1985
- In My Heart 《心里话》, 1986
- Ten Years, One Dream 《十年一梦》, 1986
- More Thoughts 《再思录》, 1995

Letters

- To Our Young Friends Looking for Aspirations 《寻找理想的少年朋友》, 1987
- The Collection of the Snow and Mud – All the Remaining Letters Written by Ba Jin to Yang Yi 《雪泥集》, 1987
- Collected Letters of Ba Jin 《巴金书信集》, 1991

Others

- A Battle For Life
- Partial excerpt of English translation of Ba Jin's dedication to Emma Goldman
- How Are We To Establish A Truly Free And Egalitarian Society?, 1921
- Nationalism and the Road to Happiness for the Chinese, 1921
- Letter from Ba Jin to the CRIA (International Anarchist Liaison Commission, Paris), 18 March 1949
- A Museum of the "Cultural Revolution", 1986

== See also ==
- 8315 Bajin
- Li Xiao
- Former Residence of Ba Jin
- List of Chinese authors
- Chinese literature
- Esperanto in China

Cultural offices
Preceded by Mao Dun	Chairman of China Writers Association; 1984–2005	Succeeded by Tie Ning
