= Tomb of Xu Guangqi =

Burial site of Xu Guangqi in Shanghai, China

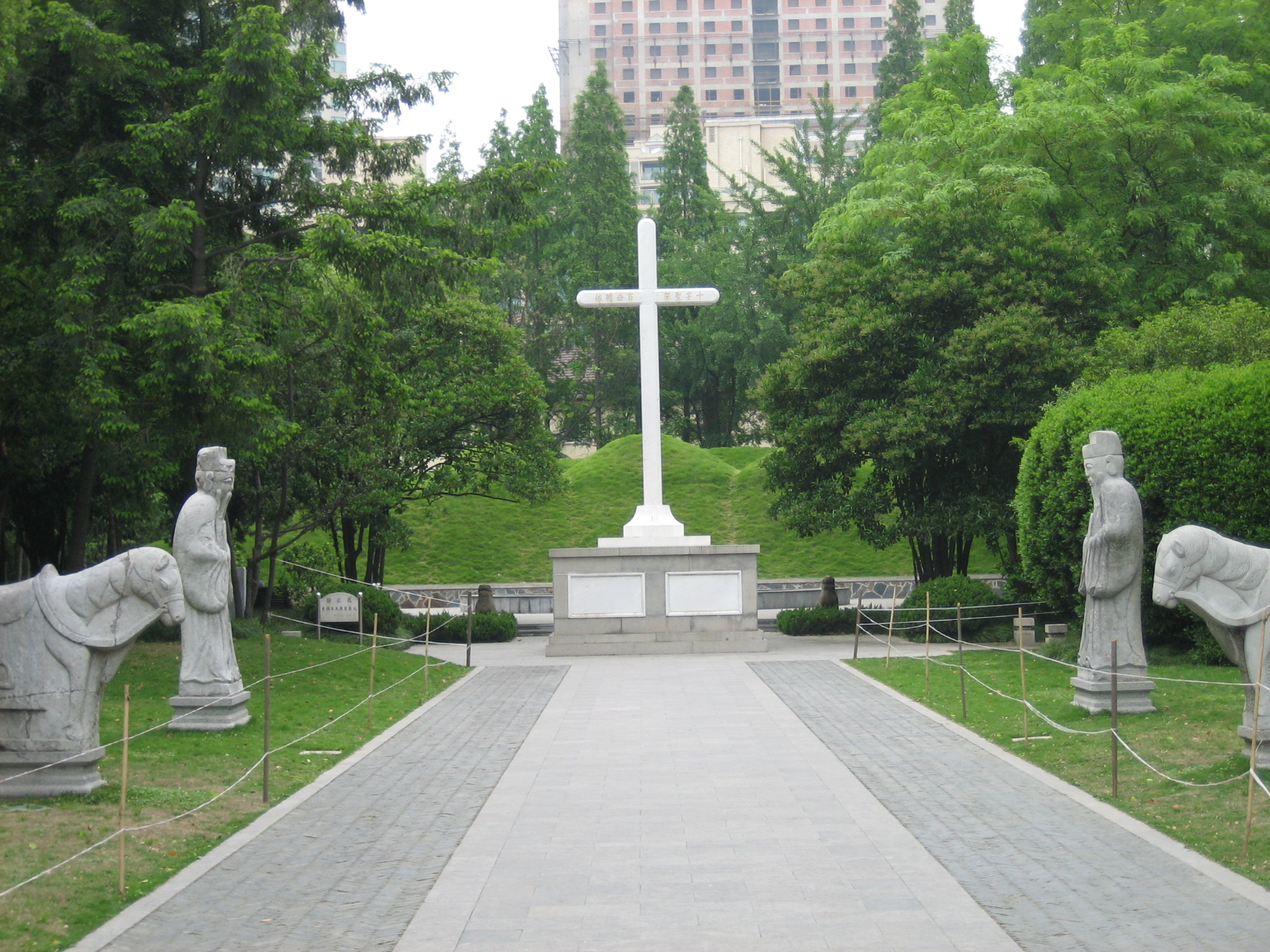
- Major cultural heritage site under national-level protection
- Period/culture: Ming dynasty
- Present location: Guangqi Park, Xujiahui, Xujiahui Subdistrict, Xuhui, Shanghai, PRC
- Coordinates: 31°11′30″N 121°25′49″E
- Classification: Ancient tomb
- Identification: 3-254 (1988)

The tomb of Xu Guangqi is the burial site of Xu Guangqi (24 April 1562 – 10 November 1633), a prominent late Ming dynasty statesman, scholar, and leader of the Catholic community, as well as some of his relatives. It is located north of Xujiahui, Shanghai, in the present-day Guangqi Park, covering an area of 3,000 square meters and standing 2.2 meters tall. The tomb is elliptical in shape.

In the seventh year of the Chongzhen era (1634), he was posthumously granted the privilege of burial with the rank of a first-rank official, and a special envoy was dispatched to escort his coffin back to Shanghai for burial. Due to the unsettled situation at the time, the coffin was temporarily placed outside the Da'nan Gate of Shanghai (Old City) in the Shuangyuan Villa. In the fourteenth year of the Chongzhen era (1641), he was finally buried in the southwest corner of Gaochang Township, Shanghai County, Songjiang Prefecture.

In the twenty-ninth year of the Guangxu era (1903), the Catholic Vicariate of Kiang-nan renovated and expanded the tomb. It was once abandoned, even turned into a vegetable garden. In 1957, it was briefly rebuilt. During the Cultural Revolution, it became an open-air warehouse and was severely damaged. It was once again restored in 1983. In 2003, it was reconstructed according to the tomb's design from 1903 and has since been well-maintained.

On 26 May 1959, and 7 December 1977, the tomb of Xu Guangqi was declared a cultural relic protection unit of Shanghai. On 13 January 1988, it was announced as a national major cultural relic protection unit by the State Council.

== History ==
=== Ancient times ===
Xu Guangqi, a native of Shanghai County, Songjiang Prefecture, Nanzhili, in the late Ming dynasty, passed the imperial examination in the 32nd year of the Wanli era (1604) and held the highest official position as the Director of the Ministry of Rites and concurrently the Grand Secretary of the Hall of Literary Profundity. He studied astronomy, calendar, mathematics, and firearms with the Jesuit missionary Matteo Ricci. He presented several astronomical and mathematical works to the Ming Emperor, along with contributions in military strategy, salt administration, land reclamation, and hydraulic engineering. Xu Guangqi's significant contributions to east–west cultural exchange earned him the title "the first person in China to truly open his eyes to the world", as described by Professor Mao Peiqi. In the sixth year of the Chongzhen era (1633), Xu Guangqi died at the age of 72. A special guard was dispatched by the Ming government to escort Xu Guangqi's remains back to Shanghai, arriving in his hometown in the second month of the seventh year of the Chongzhen era (1634). Eventually, Xu Guangqi was buried at the junction of Zhaojiabang and Fahuajing, known as the Tomb of Xu Guangqi. One of his descendants later settled near the tomb, and the area was named "Xujiahui" ("property of the Xu family at the junction of two rivers").

=== Modern times ===
Originally covering more than 1 hectare (2.5 acres), Xu Guangqi's tomb had two huabiao (ornamental columns) in front of it, as well as a stone archway. Stone statues of sheep, horses, and elderly figures were placed on both sides of the tomb path. In the 29th year of the Guangxu era (1903), the huabiao of Xu Guangqi's tomb had disappeared. Due to Xu Guangqi's Catholic faith during his lifetime, the Catholic Church erected a cross in commemoration of the 270th anniversary of Xu Guangqi's passing. Inscriptions in Chinese and Latin on the base of the cross describe Xu Guangqi's achievements, and the tomb was renovated simultaneously. In 1933, to commemorate the 300th anniversary of Xu Guangqi's passing, different communities raised funds to build an iron fence around the cross, as well as stone railings and cement roads around the cemetery. After the Second Sino-Japanese War, the trees in the vicinity were heavily felled, the soil was excavated, and the cemetery was turned into vegetable fields.

=== Present ===
In 1956, eight influential figures from the direct lineage of Xu Guangqi and the Xu clan wrote to the Shanghai People's Committee expressing their willingness to entrust Xu Guangqi's tomb to the state for safekeeping. Subsequently, Xu Guangqi's tomb was placed under the management of the Shanghai Cultural Bureau. In 1957, the tomb underwent restoration, and residents who had been cultivating vegetables in the cemetery were relocated elsewhere. Apart from the portion of land occupied by the Shanghai Meteorological Bureau staff area, the rest of the area was restored to its original state, with trees replanted within the cemetery. The surrounding area was transformed into the Nandan Park. During the Cultural Revolution, most of the landmark buildings in the cemetery were destroyed, including the rebuilt huabiao, stone archway, and stone statues, all of which were smashed, and the cemetery was converted into an open-air warehouse. In 1975, the cemetery was reclaimed by the Shanghai Municipal Gardens Department in collaboration with the Shanghai Municipal Cultural Relics Management Committee and underwent renovation.

In 1980, mathematician Su Buqing inscribed a tombstone for Xu Guangqi, which was erected in front of Xu Guangqi's tomb. In 1981, the burial mound was reconstructed, and dragon cypress and evergreen trees were planted on both sides. In 1983, Xu Guangqi's tomb was again restored. Approximately 15 meters in front of the tomb, a granite statue of Xu Guangqi wearing the robes of a first-rank official, half bust, 1.2 meters high, with a pedestal 1.6 meters high, was erected. (Note: The statue was later moved to the Xu Guangqi Memorial Hall. Reference: "徐汇各界人士祭扫徐光启墓". 网易新闻 (in Chinese). 5 April 2010. Archived from the original on 23 February 2015.) A new stele corridor was built on the east side, and a 150-square-meter granite tomb platform was constructed on the small road in front of the tomb. A large number of trees were planted around the tomb, and several stone benches were placed. In April 2012, two commemorative stone tablets were erected at Xu Guangqi's tomb, each inscribed with articles commemorating Xu Guangqi by Ruan Yuan and Chu Coching; in addition, two sculptures related to Xu Guangqi were also erected at the same time.

== Structure ==
The tomb of Xu Guangqi is located on the north side of Guangqi Park, covering an area of 3000 square meters. There are a total of 10 tombs in the cemetery. The main tomb houses Xu Guangqi and his wife, Madam Wu, while his four grandsons and their wives are buried on both sides. After the 1983 renovation, the height of the burial mound reached 2.2 meters with an area of 300 square meters, elliptical in shape, surrounded by granite paving. Green grass is planted on the burial mound, while large camphor trees, dragon cypresses, cedar trees, and oleanders are planted in front of the tomb. A tombstone stands in front, inscribed with "Tomb of Xu Guangqi" in the handwriting of mathematician Su Buqing. Stone benches are placed on both sides, and on the right side of the tomb, a Qing Dynasty stone horse is preserved.

Additionally, there is another stone horse, as well as pairs of stone sheep, stone elephants, and stone dogs, and a cross. On the east side of the tomb, there is a stele corridor built in 1983. Originally a resting pavilion in the park, it was renovated to have a wall in the middle, with 12 inscribed stone tablets, featuring Xu Guangqi's portrait, the biography of Xu Guangqi written by Zha Jizuo at the end of the Ming Dynasty and the beginning of the Qing Dynasty, the first sentence of Xu Guangqi's handwriting preface to the "Introduction to Geometry", and a poem by the Tang Dynasty poet Li Qi handwritten by Xu Guangqi. In front of the tomb, there is a memorial archway with three bays and four columns, with the inscription "Tomb of the Late Great Scholar and Prince Tutor, Posthumously Honored as Grand Guardian and Further Honored as Grand Guardian, Minister of Rites, and Concurrent Grand Secretary of the Hall of Literary Profundity, Xu Wending's Tomb". The archway also has couplets inscribed, with the upper couplet reading "Master of Calendar and Agriculture for Hundreds of Generations, Guiding Heaven and Earth", and the lower couplet reading "From General to Minister, an official devoted to military affairs and scholarly pursuits".

== Commemoration ==
On 26 May 1959, and 7 December 1977, the tomb of Xu Guangqi was successively declared a cultural heritage site in Shanghai. On 13 January 1988, the tomb of Xu Guangqi was announced by the State Council as one of the third batch of nationally major protected cultural relics. In 2003, the tomb of Xu Guangqi was designated as a patriotism education base in Shanghai. Since then, the Education Bureau, Cultural Bureau, and other units (Note: Sometimes organized by the Shanghai Municipal Administration of Cultural Heritage and the People's Government of Xuhui District.) of Xuhui District in Shanghai have organized memorial ceremonies at the tomb of Xu Guangqi every Qingming Festival. Sometimes there are offerings of flower baskets and speeches on related commemorative themes.

In 2003, the South Chunhua Hall, a cultural heritage site in Meilong, Xuhui District, was converted into the Xu Guangqi Memorial Hall. The memorial hall covers an area of more than 400 square meters, with an exhibition area of over 220 square meters. It features four exhibition themes, displaying valuable materials such as portraits, manuscripts, and documents related to Xu Guangqi.

In 2006, the contents of the lost epitaph of Xu Guangqi's tomb were discovered in a magazine published in 1920. Based on the Latin content of the epitaph on the tombstone, it was inferred that Xu Guangqi had indeed converted to Catholicism and had taken the baptismal name "Paul". In 2007, the tombstone of Xu Guangqi's tomb was accidentally discovered buried under the soil of the tomb, with an area of about 1 square meter and some damage in the upper right corner. After this discovery, the tombstone was placed in a flower bed in Guangqi Park.

== See also ==
- Tomb of Lu Xun
- Tomb of Soong Ching-Ling
- Roman Catholic Diocese of Shanghai
