= Tomb of Soong Ching Ling =

Burial site of Soong Ching-ling in Shanghai, China

Tomb of Soong Ching-ling
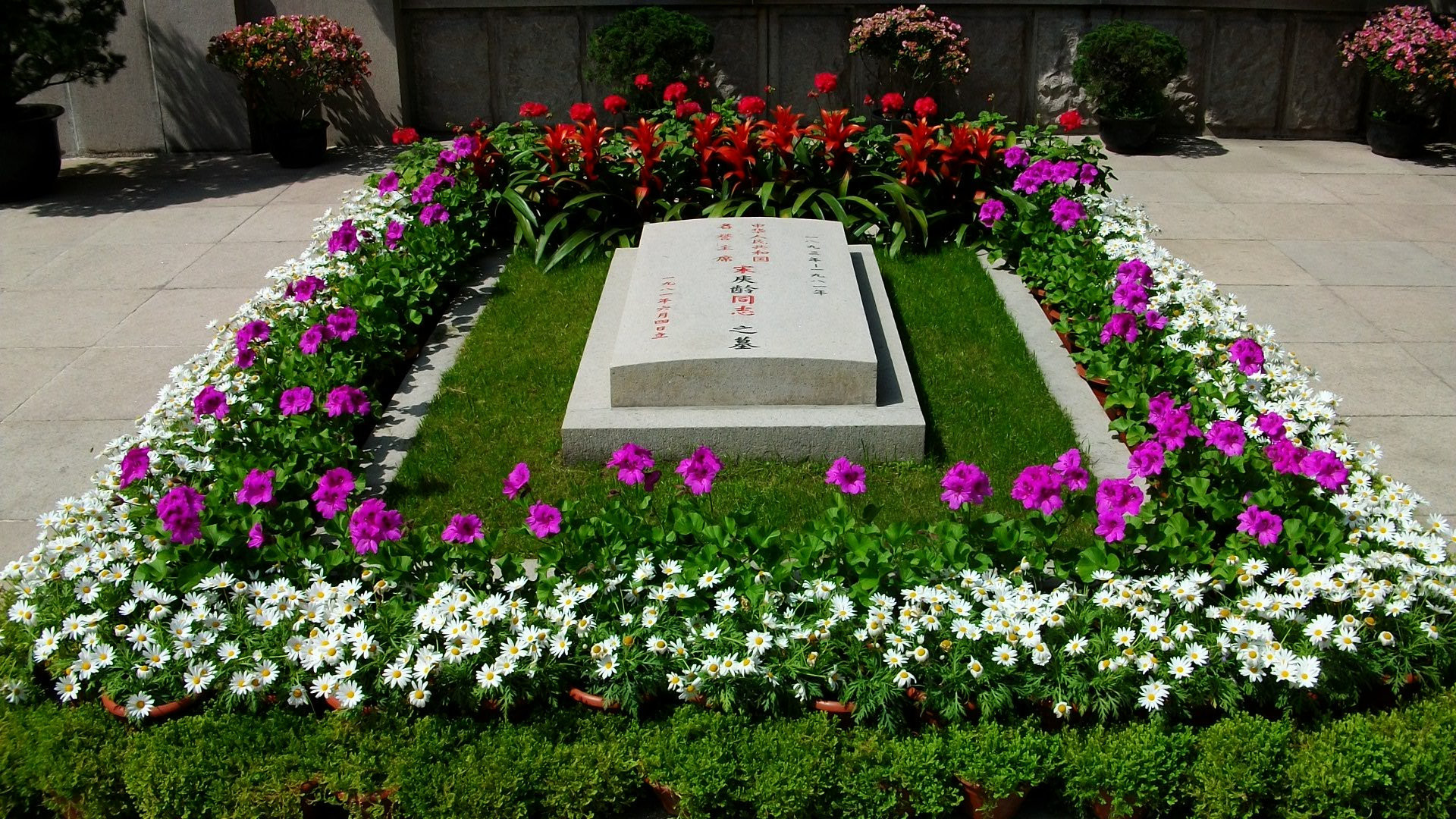
- Major cultural heritage site under national-level protection
- Created: 1981
- Present location: Soong Ching-ling Memorial Park, Changning, Shanghai, China
- Coordinates: 31°11′43.31″N 121°24′39.75″E
- Classification: Revolutionary sites and revolutionary memorial buildings.
- Identification: 2-10 (1982)

Location
- China Shanghai

The tomb of Soong Ching-ling is the mausoleum of Soong Ching-ling, the last wife of the founding father of the Republic of China, Sun Yat-sen, and the honorary chairman of the People's Republic of China. It is located next to the tomb of Soong Ching-ling's parents in the Soong Ching-ling Mausoleum (formerly the International Cemetery) in Changning district, Shanghai. The tomb of Soong Ching-ling was completed in 1981 and was declared a national major cultural relic protection unit by the State Council on February 23, 1982.

== History ==
Soong Ching-ling (January 27, 1893 - May 29, 1981) was the wife of Sun Yat-sen, the founding father of the Republic of China, honorary chairman of the People's Republic of China, vice chairman of the Standing Committee of the National People's Congress, and chairman of the China Welfare Institute. She was born in Chuansha County, Songjiang Prefecture, Jiangsu Province (now Chuansha New Town, Pudong New Area, Shanghai).

On May 29, 1981, Soong Ching-ling passed away in Beijing. The government of the People's Republic of China organized a funeral committee to hold a state funeral for Soong Ching-ling and, following her will, buried her ashes in the Soong family grave in the Shanghai International Cemetery on the morning of June 4. (Note: During the preparation for the funeral, there was once a rumor that Soong Ching-ling's body would not be cremated but would be directly placed in a coffin for burial. In response, the Shanghai municipal government specifically arranged for the armed police to rehearse the ceremony of using a coffin for burial. However, this ceremony was later confirmed to be canceled, and the coffin used for rehearsal was stored in the funeral museum of the Longhua Funeral Parlor. Source: - 黄玉抒; 何沫 (2011). 宋庆龄安葬前后 (in Chinese). 百年潮. pp. 56–60.) (Note: Regarding why Soong Ching-ling did not choose to be buried in the Sun Yat-sen Mausoleum, Liao Chengzhi and Israel Epstein both tend to believe that this was Soong Ching-ling's own decision. Epstein also points out that pressure from the Chinese Nationalist Party (Kuomintang) side could have been a contributing factor. Source: - "廖承志所著文章·我的吊唁（回忆录之一）". 人民网 (in Chinese). 2007-11-21. Archived from the original on 2015-04-02. - "宋庆龄为何不与孙中山合葬". 凤凰网 (in Chinese). 2007-11-21. Archived from the original on 2015-03-08.) Deng Yingchao, Wulanhu, Liao Chengzhi, Chen Muhua, and others escorted the remains from Beijing to Shanghai. Friends of Soong Ching-ling, consuls general of various countries in Shanghai, and major leaders of Shanghai attended the funeral.

After the funeral, the Shanghai Municipal People's Government, in accordance with the opinions of various sectors of society, partially renovated the Soong family cemetery in the International Cemetery, which was renamed the "Soong Ching-ling Mausoleum of the People's Republic of China" in 1984. (Note: The original famous cemetery and the international cemetery have both been preserved, and these sections are still referred to as the International Cemetery. Source: - "老上海的殡葬与公墓". 城市导报 (in Chinese). 2013-06-28. Archived from the original on 2015-04-02.) On February 23, 1982, the State Council of China announced the tomb of Soong Ching-ling as a national major cultural relic protection unit. In May 1986, a memorial stele commemorating Soong Ching-ling was erected in the Soong Ching-ling Mausoleum, with an inscription by Deng Xiaoping.

== Structure ==
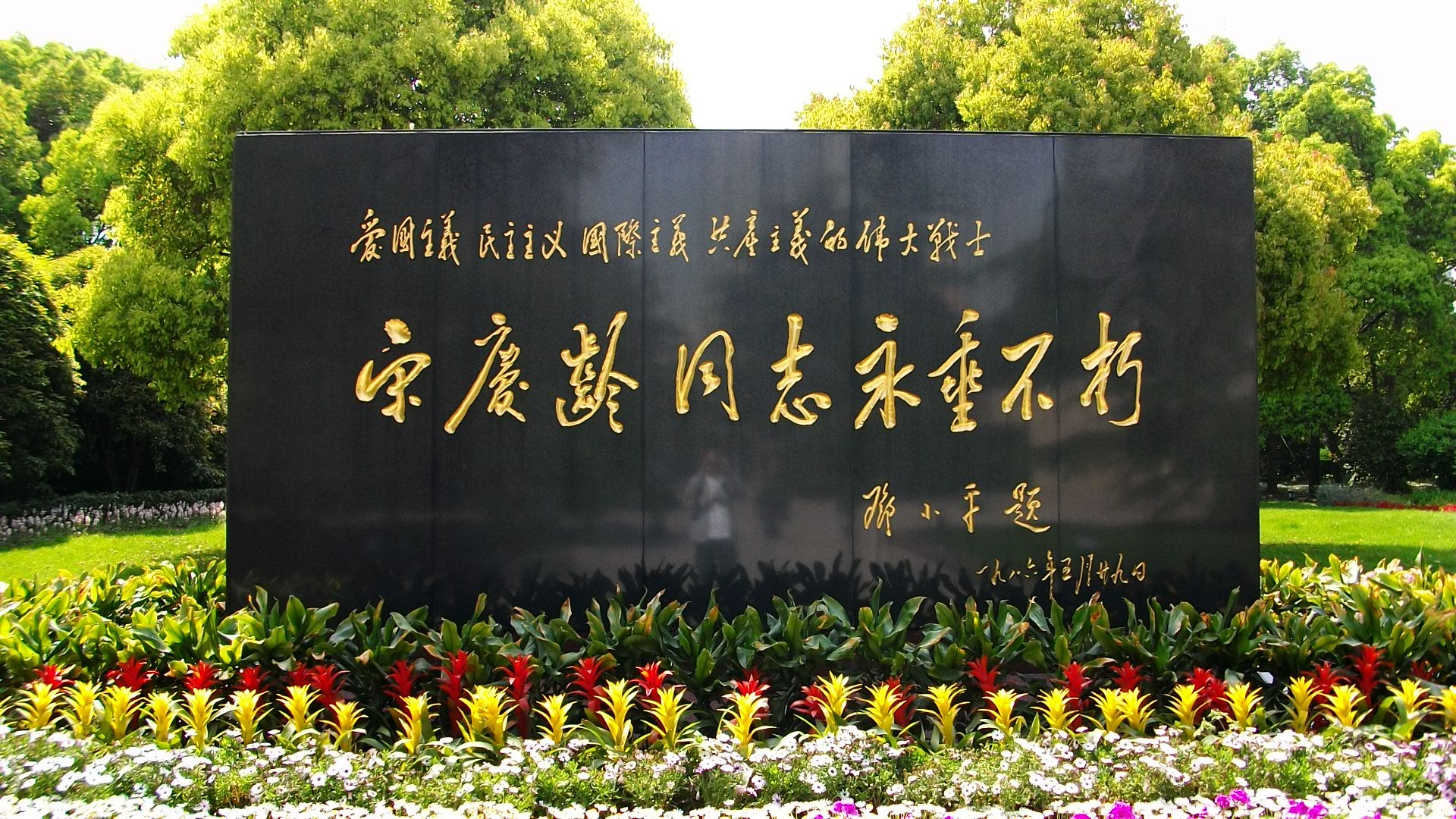
The monument with Deng Xiaoping's inscription in the Soong Ching-ling Mausoleum: "Comrade Soong Ching-ling, the great warrior of patriotism, democracy, internationalism, and communism, will be immortalized forever".

Soong Ching-ling's tomb is located in the central north part of the Soong Ching-ling Memorial Park, on the east side of her parents' tomb. It covers an area of 263 square meters. The tombstone is made of lying granite, measuring 120 centimeters long and 60 centimeters wide. It is engraved with the words "The tomb of Comrade Soong Ching-ling, Honorary Chairman of the People's Republic of China, born in 1893 and died in 1981, erected on June 4, 1981". The font used is Liuyan.

At the south end of the tomb is a memorial square covering an area of 2880 square meters, capable of accommodating over 1000 people simultaneously. In the center north of the memorial square stands a Han white marble statue of Soong Ching-ling, (Note: The sculpture is modeled after Soong Ching-ling at her most charismatic around the age of 50, wearing a qipao and the round-collared jacket she wore when visiting Ceylon (now Sri Lanka), with her hair styled in a bun. Her hands are crossed and resting on her knees, with a gentle smile on her face. Source: - "海内外人士在沪纪念宋庆龄逝世30周年". 新华网 (in Chinese). 2011-05-29. Archived from the original on 2015-04-02.) 2.52 meters tall, mounted on a polished granite veneer base 1.1 meters high. Behind the tomb is a small hill planted with evergreen trees such as Chinese juniper, dragon juniper, and spruce. Surrounding the tomb are flowers loved by Soong Ching-ling during her lifetime, including lilacs, magnolias, crape myrtles, and azaleas.

In the center of the cemetery avenue stands the Soong Ching-ling monument, 3.3 meters high and 5 meters wide. On the front, Deng Xiaoping's inscription reads: "Comrade Soong Ching-ling, the great warrior of patriotism, democracy, internationalism, and communism, will be immortalized forever". On the back is an inscription in regular script with over 3300 characters in gold leaf, recording Soong Ching-ling's life and achievements.

== Commemoration ==
After Soong Ching-ling's passing, people from home and abroad visit Soong Ching-ling's tomb to commemorate her on her death anniversary and birthday. Relevant seminars are also held in the Soong Ching-ling Memorial Park. Additionally, local universities in Shanghai organize students to visit Soong Ching-ling's tomb for tomb-sweeping and other memorial activities around the Qingming Festival. Schools like Changning district Jianqing Experimental School organize students for "summer practice activities", during which students visit Soong Ching-ling's tomb. In December 2002, the management of the Soong Ching-ling Memorial Park carried out major renovations, including Soong Ching-ling's tomb, which were completed before the Qingming Festival in 2003.

== See also ==
- Soong Ching-ling Memorial Residence (Shanghai)
- Tomb of Xu Guangqi
- Tomb of Lu Xun
