= Complete Treatise on Agriculture =

17th-century book by Xu Guangqi

- Author: Xu Guangqi
- Publication date: 1639
- Publication place: Ming Dynasty

Complete Treatise on Agriculture (simplified Chinese: 农政全书; traditional Chinese: 農政全書), or Complete Book of Agricultural Management, or Encyclopaedia of Agriculture, is a compilation of the ancient scientific studies of agriculture written by Xu Guangqi. The book was composed from 1625 to 1628 and published in 1639, totalling 700,000 words.

Complete Treatise on Agriculture summarises many of the agricultural experiences and techniques of the ancient Chinese working people, citing over 300 kinds of ancient works and documents.
