= Xu Guangqi Memorial Hall =

Museum in Shanghai, China

Coordinates: 31.1912°N 121.42957°E

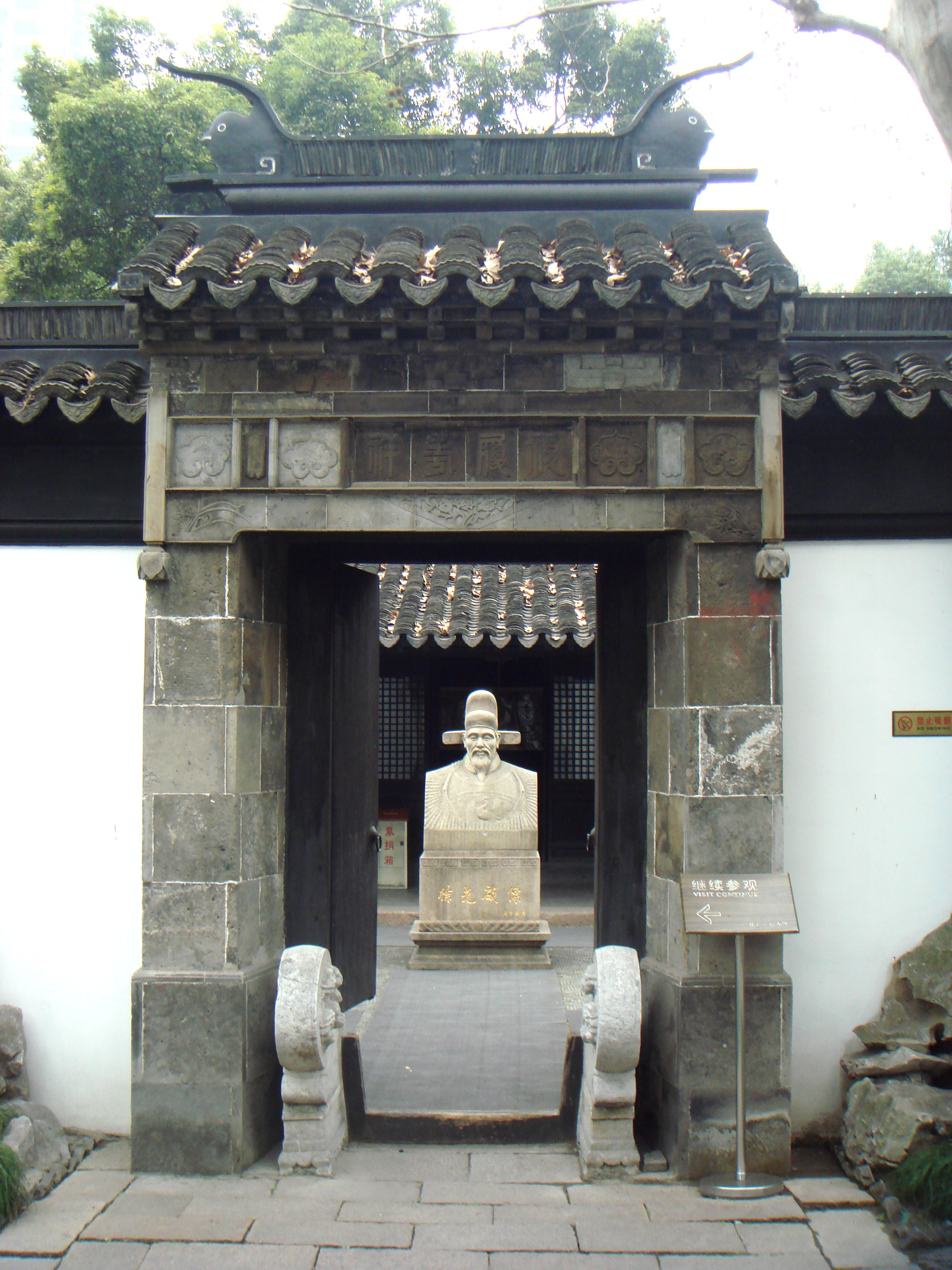
Xu Guangqi Memorial Hall.

The Xu Guangqi Memorial Hall (徐光启纪念馆) is a memorial and museum for the 17th-century Chinese scholar Xu Guangqi. It is located besides the tomb of Xu Guangqi in Guangqi Park (光启公园), Xujiahui, Xuhui District, Shanghai, China. Formerly Nandan Park (南丹公园), the park was renamed in 1983 for the 350th anniversary of Xu Guangqi's death.

== See also ==
- Tomb of Xu Guangqi

== Gallery ==
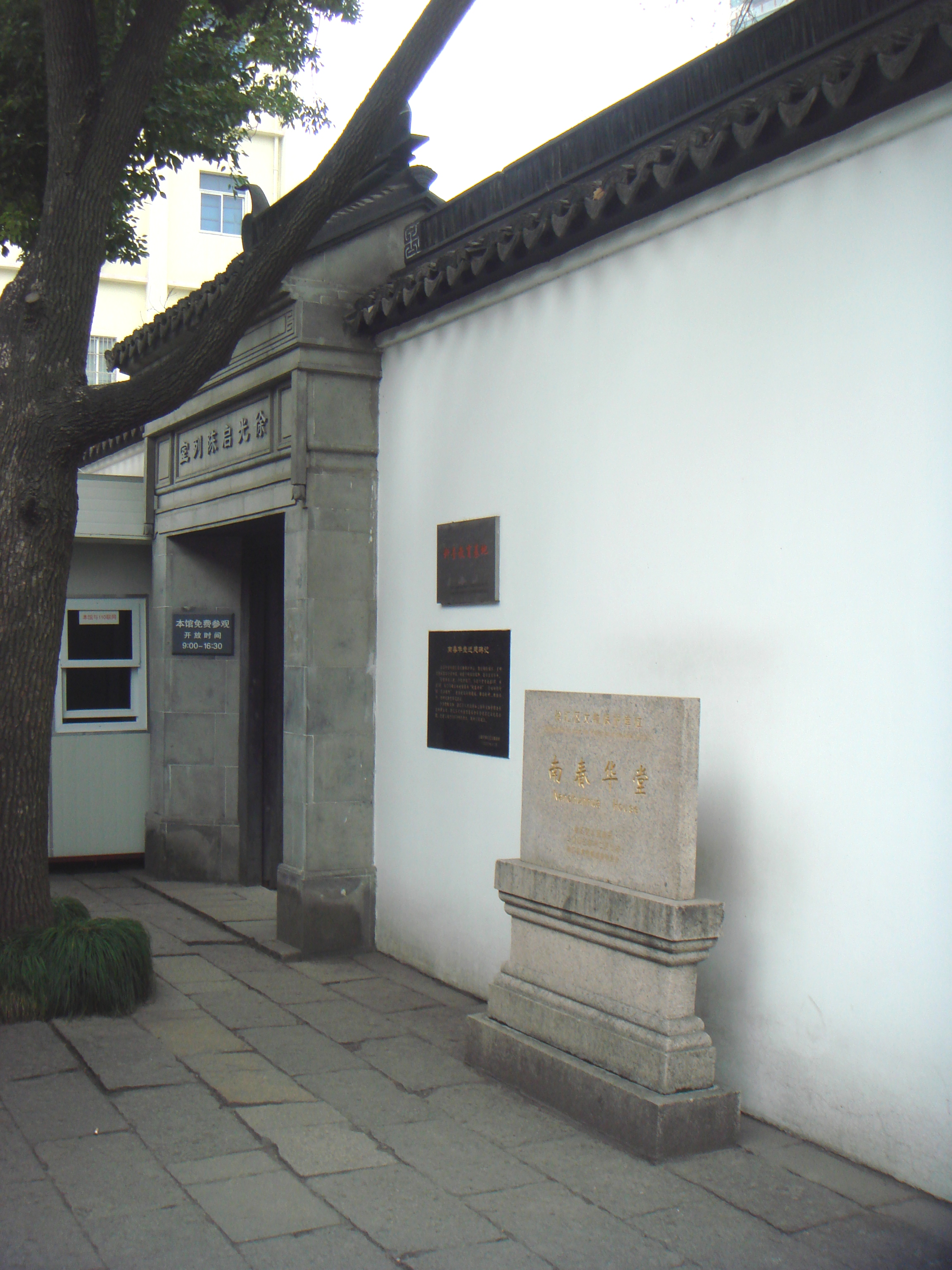
Entrance to the Xu Guangqi Memorial Hall.

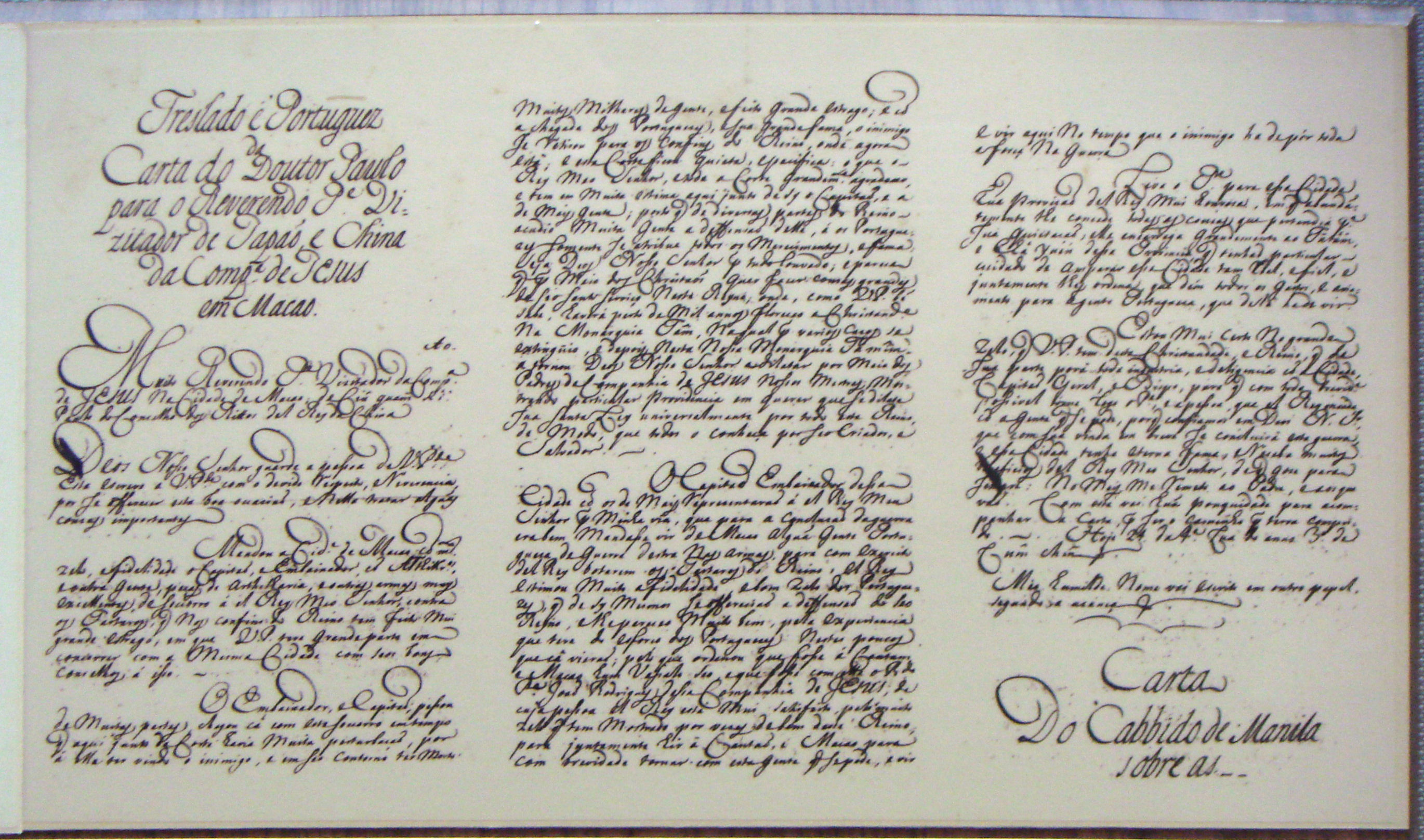
Letter of Xu Quangxi to the King of Portugal, in Portuguese.

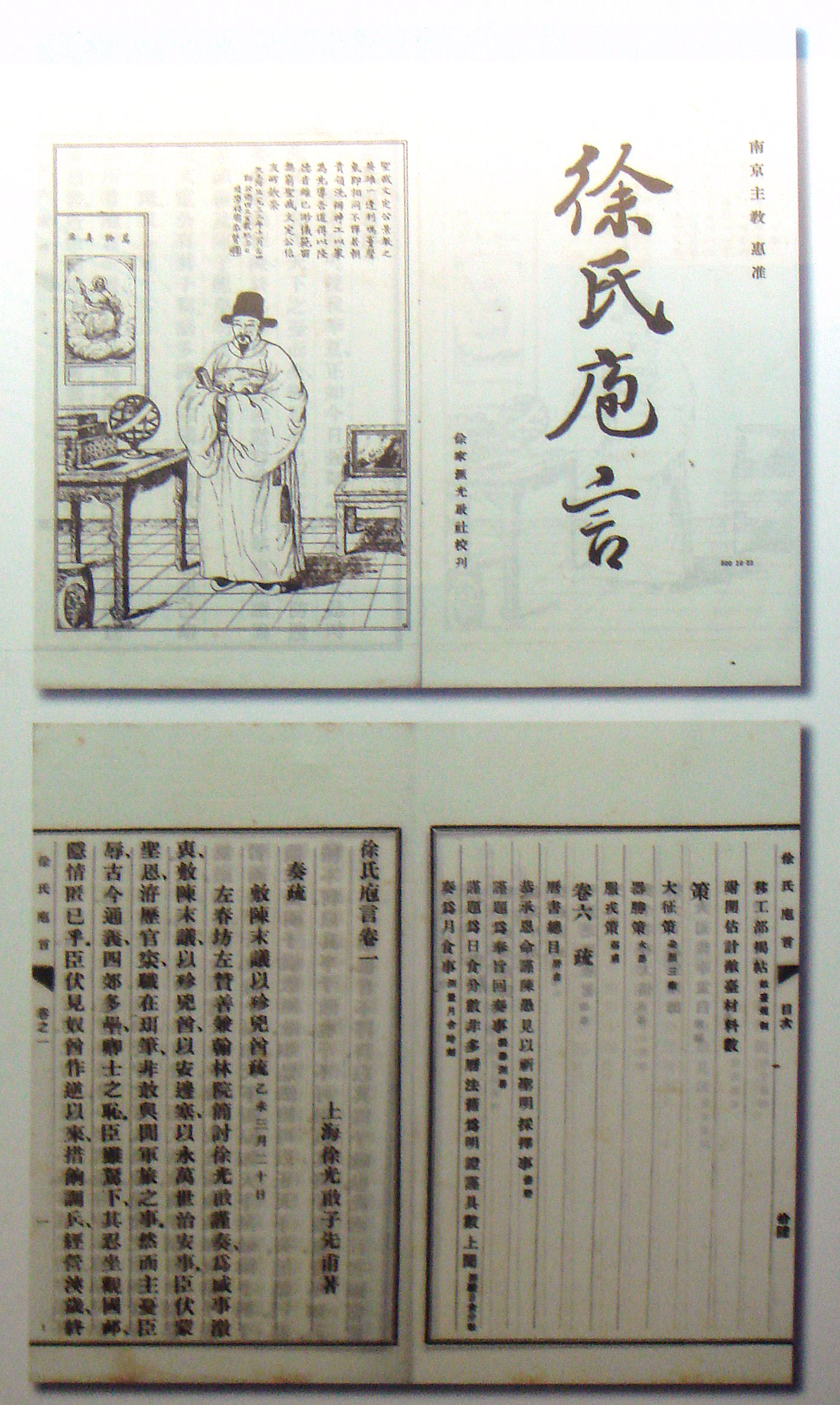
Xu Guangxi's work on military matters Cook Xu's words.
