= Candida Xu =

Chinese Christian leader, 1607–1680

- 徐甘弟大 許甘弟大 許徐甘弟大
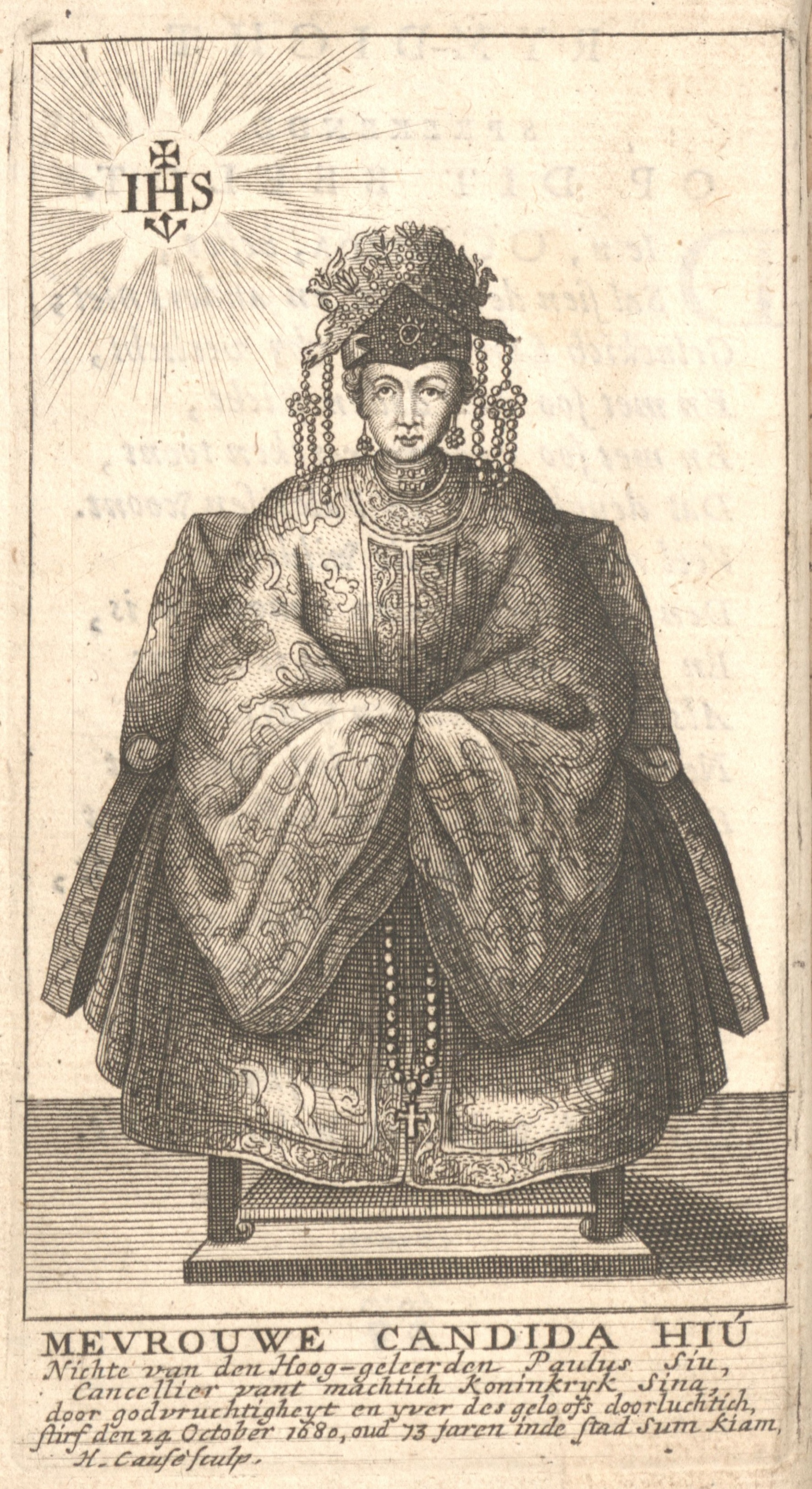
- Born: September 4, 1607
- Died: July 24, 1680 (aged 72)
- Relatives: Xu Guangqi (grandfather)

Candida Xu or Candida Su (Chinese: 許徐甘弟大; pinyin: Xǔ-Xú Gāndìdà; Wade–Giles: Hsü^{3}-Hsü^{2} Kan^{1}-ti^{4}-ta^{4}; French: Candida Hiù; September 4, 1607 – July 24, 1680), was a Chinese Catholic who lived in late Ming and early Qing China. She has been called "arguably the most influential Chinese Christian woman of the seventeenth century." She is also, according to records, likely the first Chinese woman who learned Latin.

== Biography ==
Born on the feast day of Saint Candida the Elder, in whose honor she was named, Xu was the granddaughter of Xu Guangqi, who had converted to Christianity four years previously.

From childhood, she was profoundly devout. Widowed at 46, she redirected her focus towards serving the church. Despite the limitations imposed on her due to her upper-class status, she worked to spread the word of Christianity. She exercised the influence of her father and son to gain good will for many Jesuit missionaries among local officials.

Among Chinese Christians she promoted her spiritual associations; she also acted as a leader for Christian women around Shanghai. She had a private income, from which she donated generously to finance living arrangements for missionaries; she also funded the building of close to forty churches and chapels, and facilitated publication of many religious works in the Chinese language.

She also led weaving efforts within the female community, which included her daughters. The cloth and embroideries that they wove helped them make an equivalent of several thousand French crowns, which she also donated to support missionary work. She helped the Catholic Church in Sichuan search for surviving converts after the devastation wrought by Zhang Xianzhong.

She was referred to as the Apostle of China by many. Her story gained currency in Europe through a biography by Philippe Couplet, her confessor.
