= Chongzhen calendar =

Lunisolar Chinese calendar

Today (at UTC+00)
- Wednesday, 27 May 2026
- Chinese: Yang Metal Rat・Chariot Mansion; 11 Sìyue, Bǐngwǔnián (Xiaoman, 9 days until Mangzhong)
Other calendars
Armenian	11 Margach 1475
Bengali	13 Joishtho, BS 1433
Common Era	27 May 2026 CE
Coptic	19 Pashons, AM 1742
Egyptian	11 Phaophi, NE 2775
Ethiopian	19 Genbot, AD 2018
French Republican	Décade I, Octidi de Prairial de l'Année 234 de la République
Gregorian	27 May, AD 2026
Hebrew	11 Sivan, AM 5786
Islamic	10 Dhu al-Hijjah, AH 1447 (tabular method)
ISO week date	2026-W22-3
Japanese	11 Uzuki, Reiwa 8 (Shōman, 10 days until Bōshu)
Julian	14 May, AD 2026 (AM 7534)
Maya	13.0.13.11.5; 18 Zip, 8 Chicchan
Roman	Pridie Idus Maias, AUC 2779
Solar Hijri	6 Khordad, SH 1405

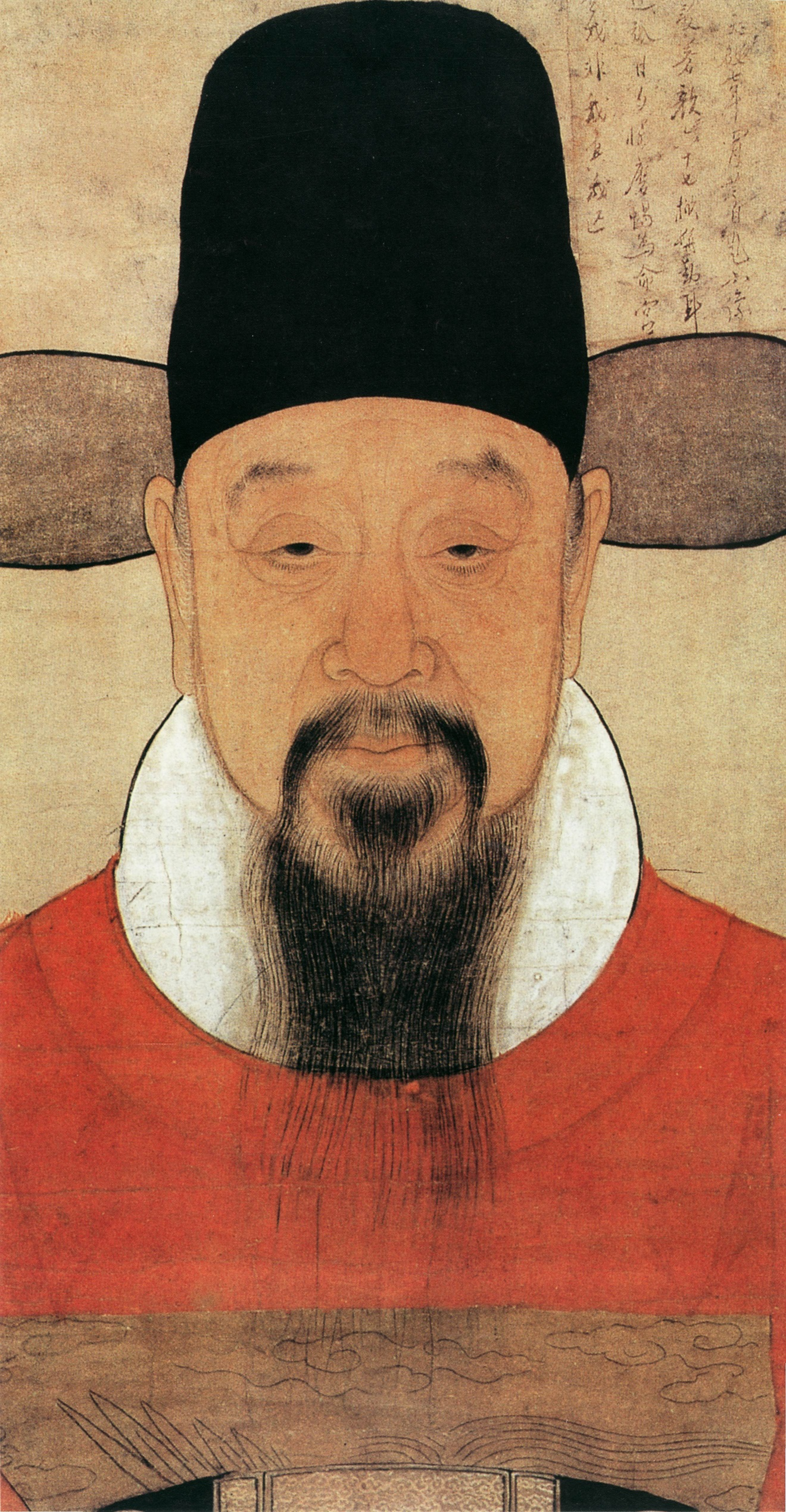
Portrait of Xu Guangqi (Nanjing Museum collection)

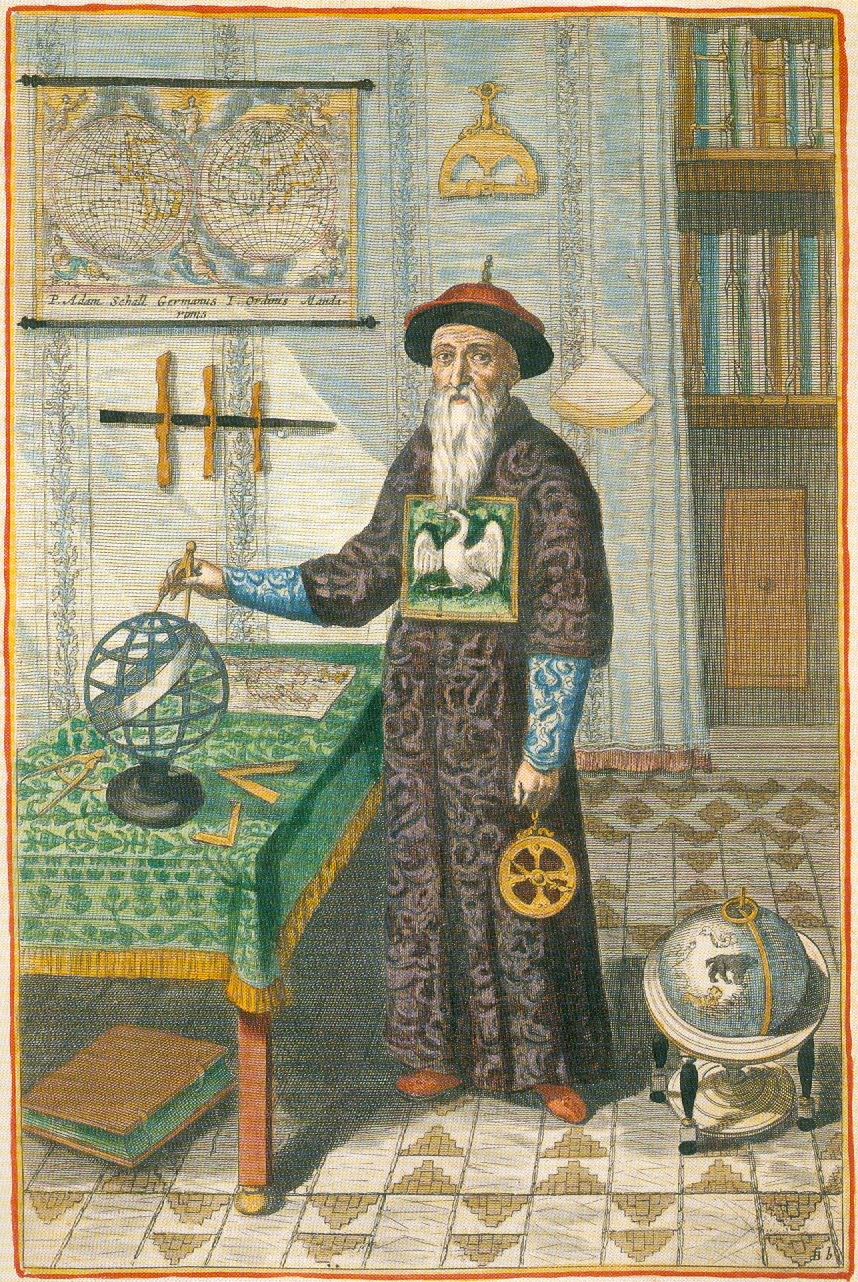
The Jesuit Johann Adam Schall von Bell (1592–1666) in the clothing of a Mandarin (bureaucrat)

The Chongzhen calendar (Chinese: 崇禎曆; pinyin: Chóngzhēn lì; Wade–Giles: Ch‘ung^{2}-chên^{1} Li^{4}) or Shixian calendar (Chinese: 時憲曆; pinyin: Shíxiàn lì; Wade–Giles: Shih^{2}hsian^{4} Li^{4}) was a historical edition of the lunisolar Chinese calendar from 1645 to 1913. It was developed by the lead of Xu Guangqi with the assistance of the Jesuit scholars Johann Schreck and Johann Adam Schall von Bell from 1624 to 1644, and was dedicated to the Chongzhen Emperor. When he died a year after it was released, it was propagated in the first year of the Qing dynasty by the Shunzhi Emperor, who changed its name to Shíxiàn calendar.

This calendar is notable for systematically introducing the concepts and development of European mathematics and astronomy to China for the first time, and constituted the first major collaboration between scientists from Europe and from the Far East. Documented in more than 100 volumes of books, it offered an encyclopedic account of Euclidean geometry, spherical geometry and trigonometry, with extensive translations and references to Euclid's Elements and the works of Nicolaus Copernicus, Johannes Kepler, Galileo Galilei, and Tycho Brahe, whose Tychonic system was used its main theoretical basis. In addition, a comprehensive set of mathematical tables and astronomical ephemerides was included.

The main changes introduced by the calendar are:

- Replacement of the original píngqì fǎ (平氣法; 'equal term method') solar term system (based on dividing a tropical year equally) with one based on the ecliptic longitude of the sun known as the dìngqì fǎ (定氣法; 'steady term method').
- Placement of intercalary months changed to accommodate the changes in the solar term system.

This calendar was used from the early Qing period into the early modern era, but was modified and replaced in 1914 and again in 1928, with various minor modifications since then. In 1928, it was put under the management of Purple Mountain Observatory (Zijinshan Astronomical Observatory), thus the present version is popularly referenced to as the Zijin calendar. All of these editions were based on modern astronomical data. In the People's Republic of China, it has been officially standardized as GB/T 33661-2017, "Calculation and Promulgation of the Chinese Calendar", issued by the Standardization Administration of China on May 12, 2017.
