= Chuansha County =

Former county of Shanghai, China

Coordinates: 31°11′40″N 121°41′29″E

Chuansha County 川沙县; 川沙縣
- County of China
- 1911–1992
- Location of Chuansha County on Shanghai.
- History
  - Established: 1911
  - Disestablished: 1992
Succeeded by
Pudong
- Today part of: Part of the Pudong New Area, Shanghai

Chuansha County
- Traditional Chinese: 川沙縣
- Simplified Chinese: 川沙县
- Wungiu: tshoe^{1} so^{1} yoe^{6}
Transcriptions
Standard Mandarin
- Hanyu Pinyin: Chuānshā Xiàn
Wu
- Wugniu: tshoe^{1} so^{1} yoe^{6}
- IPA: Shanghainese: [tsʰø˥ so˧ ɦyø˨]
Yue: Cantonese
- Jyutping: cyun^{1} saa^{1} jyun^{6}

Chuansha County (simplified Chinese: 川沙县; traditional Chinese: 川沙縣; pinyin: Chuānshā Xiàn; Wugniu: tshoe^{1} so^{1} yoe^{6}) was a county located in the east of Shanghai until it was fully absorbed by the previously split Pudong New Area in 1993.

== History ==
Chuansha was originally part of Shanghai County until 1801 and fully upgraded into a county in 1911. In 1951 Chuansha was transfer from Jiangsu Province into Shanghai's direct rule. On 2 May 1990 the northern part of Chuansha County was split and established Pudong New Area Management Committee along with portions of Huangpu, Nanshi, Yangpu districts east of Huangpu River along with the northeastern part of Shanghai County. Finally on 11 October 1992 the remaining portion of Chuansha County was dissolved and merged into Pudong New Area.

== See also ==
- Pudong
