= Songjiang Prefecture =

Historic prefecture of China

Location of Songjiang Prefecture in Jiangsu Province (1820)

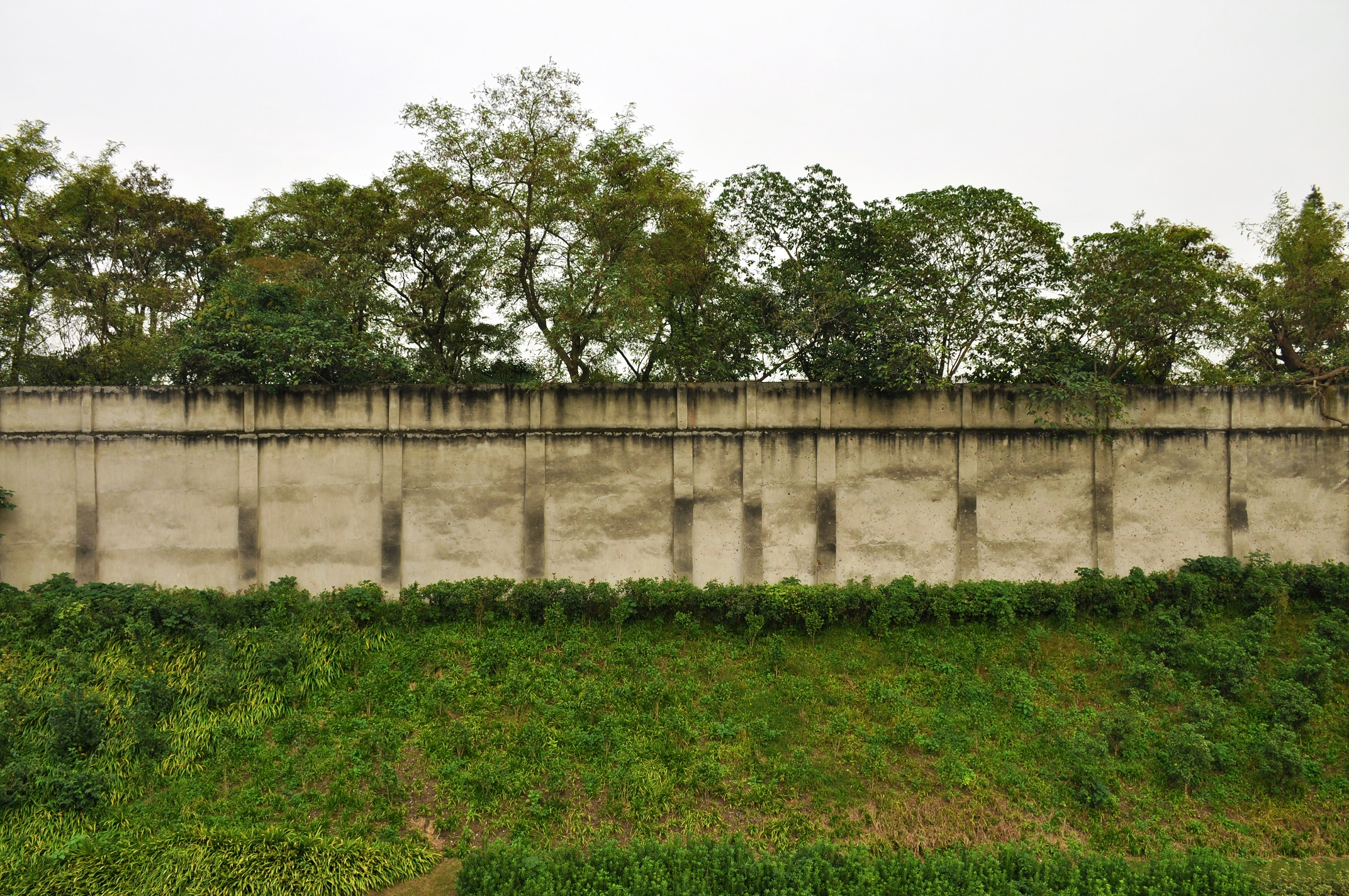
Ruins of Songjiang Prefecture City

Songjiang Prefecture (Chinese: 松江府) was a historical prefecture (fu) in ancient China existing from 1291 to 1912, covering much of today's Municipality of Shanghai. Its predecessor was Huating Prefecture (1277-1291), with administrative seat in Huating County (in present-day Songjiang District, Shanghai).

== History ==
=== Establishment ===
Songjiang got its name from Suzhou Creek, whose name in Chinese is Wusongjiang/Woosungjiang (吴淞江). In the 1277 during the Zhiyuan era of the Yuan dynasty, Huating County (華亭縣) was elevated to Huating Prefecture. The following year (1278), Huating Prefecture was renamed Songjiang Prefecture, and administered Huating County. In the 27th year of the Zhiyuan era (1290), parts of Huating County were separated to establish Shanghai County, which covered areas corresponding to present-day central Shanghai, Minhang District, and surrounding areas, with its county seat located in what is now Huangpu District, within the area known as the Old City of Shanghai.

=== Reform ===
The year 1291 is generally regarded as the year when Shanghai was formally established as an administrative division. In the same year, Songjiang Prefecture was removed from the jurisdiction of Jiaxing Route (嘉興路, now Jiaxing) and placed directly under the Jiangzhe Branch Secretariat. In 1326, Songjiang Prefecture was temporarily abolished, and Huating County and Shanghai County were transferred to the jurisdiction of Jiaxing Route. In 1328, Songjiang Prefecture was restored, and Huating County and Shanghai County once again came under its jurisdiction. Toward the end of the Yuan dynasty, Songjiang was temporarily occupied by Zhang Shicheng, and was subsequently conquered by Zhu Yuanzhang.

During the Ming dynasty, in the Jiajing era (1542), parts of Huating County and Shanghai County were separated to establish Qingpu County, corresponding to present-day Qingpu District, Shanghai.

During the Qing dynasty, in 1656, Lou County (婁縣) was established, corresponding to southwestern present-day Songjiang District and the entirety of Jinshan District. In 1724, Fengxian County (present-day Fengxian District), Jinshan County (present-day Jinshan District), Nanhui County (southern part of present-day Pudong New Area), and Fuquan County (福泉縣, northeastern parts of present-day Qingpu District, among other areas) were established. In the eighth year of the Yongzheng era (1730), Fuquan County was merged into Qingpu County. In 1805, Chuansha Administrative Office, a county-level administrative division, was established in the northern part of present-day Pudong New Area.

=== Abolition ===
Following the Xinhai Revolution, Cheng Dequan, the Governor of Jiangsu, declared Jiangsu independent on November 5, 1911. In January 1912, the Jiangsu Provisional Assembly resolved to implement the Interim Local Government Regulations of Jiangsu (江蘇暫行地方制). The Jiangsu Provincial Government subsequently ordered the abolition of prefectures and subprefectures and the consolidation of counties and administrative offices. As a result, Songjiang Prefecture and Shanghai Circuit were abolished, and the counties formerly under their jurisdiction were placed directly under Jiangsu Province. In 1914, Hu-Hai Circuit (滬海道) was established.

1927, Hu-Hai Circuit was abolished and Shanghai Special Municipality was established, marking the basic formation of Shanghai's present-day administrative boundaries.
