= List of township-level divisions of Shanghai =

Location of Shanghai municipality in China

This is a list of township-level divisions of the municipality of Shanghai, People's Republic of China (PRC).

After province, prefecture, and county-level divisions, township-level divisions constitute the formal fourth-level administrative divisions of the PRC. However, as Shanghai is a province-level municipality, the prefecture-level divisions are absent and so county-level divisions are at the second level, and township-level divisions are at the third level of administration. This list is organised by the county-level divisions of the municipality. As of 8 January 2016, there are a total of 104 subdistricts, 107 towns and 2 townships in Shanghai, excluding special township-level divisions.

== Baoshan District ==
Location of Baoshan District in the municipality

Baoshan District has three subdistricts, nine towns and one special township-level division.

Name	Chinese (S)	Hanyu Pinyin	Shanghainese Romanization	Population (2010)	Area (km^{2})
Subdistricts
Wusong Subdistrict	吴淞街道	Wúsōng Jiēdào	wu son ka do	104,162	7.52
Youyi Road Subdistrict	友谊路街道	Yǒuyìlù Jiēdào	yoe gnij lu ka do	136,814	10.45
Zhangmiao Subdistrict	张庙街道	Zhāngmiào Jiēdào	tzan mio ka do	172,284	5.19
Towns
Dachang Town	大场镇	Dàchǎng Zhèn	da zan tzen	371,856	27.22
Gaojing Town	高境镇	Gāojìng Zhèn	ko cin tzen	127,512	11.23
Gucun Town	顾村镇	Gùcūn Zhèn	ku tsen tzen	240,185	41.66
Luodian Town	罗店镇	Luōdiàn Zhèn	lu ti tzen	118,323	44.19
Luojing Town	罗泾镇	Luōjīng Zhèn	lu cin tzen	54,329	47.68
Miaohang Town	庙行镇	Miàoxíng Zhèn	mio haon tzen	89,615	5.96
Songnan Town	淞南镇	Sōngnán Zhèn	son neu tzen	127,347	13.65
Yanghang Town	杨行镇	Yángxíng Zhèn	yan raon tzen	204,564	37.91
Yuepu Town	月浦镇	Yuèpǔ Zhèn	yueq phu tzen	139,328	47.34
Special Township-Level Divisions
Baoshan City Industrial Park	宝山城市工业园区	Bǎoshān Chéngshì Gōngyè Yuánqū	bo se zen zy gon gniq yeu chiu	18,567	4.35

== Changning District ==
Location of Changning District in the municipality

Changning District has nine subdistricts and one town.

Name	Chinese (S)	Hanyu Pinyin	Shanghainese Romanization	Population (2010)	Area (km^{2})
Subdistricts
Beixinjing Subdistrict	北新泾街道	Běixīnjīng Jiēdào	poq sin cin ka do	46,865	2.13
Chengjiaqiao Subdistrict	程家桥街道	Chéngjiāqiáo Jiēdào	dzen ka djio ka do	24,487	7.60
Hongqiao Subdistrict	虹桥街道	Hóngqiáo Jiēdào	ron djio ka do	59,551	4.08
Huayang Road Subdistrict	华阳路街道	Huáyánglù Jiēdào	wu yan lu ka do	72,730	2.04
Jiangsu Road Subdistrict	江苏路街道	Jiāngsūlù Jiēdào	kaon su lu ka do	51,883	1.52
Tianshan Road Subdistrict	天山路街道	Tiānshānlù Jiēdào	ti se lu ka do	73,757	11.00
Xianxia Xincun Subdistrict	仙霞新村街道	Xiānxiá Xīncūn Jiēdào	si ya sin tsen ka do	84,664	3.97
Xinhua Subdistrict	新华路街道	Xīnhuálù Jiēdào	sin wu lu ka do	73,230	2.20
Zhoujiaqiao Subdistrict	周家桥街道	Zhōujiāqiáo Jiēdào	tzoe ka djio ka do	56,628	1.95
Towns
Xinjing Town	新泾镇	Xīnjīng Zhèn	sin cin tzen	146,776	35.40

== Chongming District ==
Location of Chongming District in the municipality

Chongming District has sixteen towns, three special township-level divisions and two townships.

Name	Chinese (S)	Hanyu Pinyin	Shanghainese Romanization	Population (2010)	Area (km^{2})
Towns
Bu Town	堡镇	Bǎozhèn	phu tzen	60,111	63.48
Changxing Town	长兴镇	Chángxìng Zhèn	tzan xin tzen	99,134	88.54
Chengqiao Town	城桥镇	Chéngqiáo Zhèn	zen djio tzen	113,442	58.00
Chenjia Town	陈家镇	Chénjiā Zhèn	dzen ka tzen	53,996	94.90
Dongping Town	东平镇	Dōngpíng Zhèn	ton bin tzen	15,112	119.70
Gangxi Town	港西镇	Gǎngxī Zhèn	kaon sij tzen	23,416	49.39
Gangyan Town	港沿镇	Gǎngyán Zhèn	kaon yi tzen	40,741	70.00
Jianshe Town	建设镇	Jiànshè Zhèn	ci seq tzen	27,466	42.40
Lühua Town	绿华镇	Lǜhuá Zhèn	oq rau tzen	7,061	37.45
Miao Town	庙镇	Miàozhèn	mio tzen	45,926	95.70
Sanxing Town	三星镇	Sānxīng Zhèn	se sin tzen	29,894	68.70
Shuxin Town	竖新镇	Shùxīn Zhèn	zyu sin tzen	40,823	60.00
Xianghua Town	向化镇	Xiànghuà Zhèn	xian hau tzen	26,265	53.78
Xinhai Town	新海镇	Xīnhǎi Zhèn	sin he tzen	11,646	105.04
Xinhe Town	新河镇	Xīnhé Zhèn	sin wu tzen	42,737	57.25
Zhongxing Town	中兴镇	Zhōngxìng Zhèn	tzon xin tzen	25,274	45.54
Townships
Hengsha Township	横沙乡	Héngshā Xiāng	wan sau xian	27,916	51.74
Xincun Township	新村乡	Xīncūn Xiāng	sin tsen xian	9,581	32.50
Special Township-Level Divisions
Dongping Forest Park	东平林场	Dōngpíng Línchǎng	ton bin lin dzan	35	3.55
Qianwei Farm	前卫农场	Qiánwèi Nóngchǎng	dzi we non dzan	1,695	13.10
Shangshi Contemporary Agricultural Park	上实现代农业园区	Shàngshí Xiàndài Nóngyè Yuánqū	zaon dzeq yi de non gniq yeu chiu	1,451	14.50

== Fengxian District ==
Location of Fengxian District in the municipality

Fengxian District has one subdistrict, eight towns and four special township-level divisions.

Name	Chinese (S)	Hanyu Pinyin	Shanghainese Romanization	Population (2010)	Area (km^{2})
Subdistricts
Xidu Subdistrict	西渡街道	Xīdù Jiēdào	sij du ka do	194,854	28.77
Fengpu Subdistrict	奉浦街道	Fèngpǔ Jiēdào	von phu ka do	57,341	20.80
Towns
Fengcheng Town	奉城镇	Fèngchéng Zhèn	von zen tzen	176,938	110.65
Haiwan Town	海湾镇	Hǎiwān Zhèn	he ue tzen	28,457	100.60
Jinhui Town	金汇镇	Jīnhuì Zhèn	cin we tzen	108,264	71.72
Nanqiao Town	南桥镇	Nánqiáo Zhèn	neu djio tzen	185,382	114.68
Qingcun Town	青村镇	Qīngcūn Zhèn	tsin tsen tzen	89,163	74.31
Situan Town	四团镇	Sìtuán Zhèn	sy deu tzen	65,389	74.10
Zhelin Town	柘林镇	Zhèlín Zhèn	tzau lin tzen	62,589	73.50
Zhuanghang Town	庄行镇	Zhuāngháng Zhèn	tzaon haon tzen	62,388	70.00
Special Township-Level Divisions
Jinhai Community ^{*}	金海社区	Jīnhǎi Shèqū	cin he zau chiu	32,123	18.49
Shanghai Fengxian Bay Tourism Zone	上海市奉贤区海湾旅游区	Shànghǎi Shì Fèngxián Qū Hǎiwān Lǚyóuqū	zaon he zy von yi chiu he ue liu yoe chiu	29,151	13.20
Shanghai Seaport Comprehensive Economic Development Zone	上海海港综合经济开发区	Shànghǎi Hǎigǎng Zònghé Jīngjì Kāifāqū	zaon he he kaon tzon heq cin ji khe faq chiu	10,475	15.00

== Hongkou District ==
Location of Hongkou District in the municipality

Hongkou District has eight subdistricts.

Name	Chinese (S)	Hanyu Pinyin	Shanghainese Romanization	Population (2010)	Area (km^{2})
Subdistricts
Guangzhong Road Subdistrict	广中路街道	Guǎngzhōnglù Jiēdào	kuaon tzon lu ka do	122,669	2.89
Jiangwanzhen Subdistrict	江湾镇街道	Jiāngwān Zhèn Jiēdào	kaon ue tzen ka do	129,035	4.17
Jiaxing Road Subdistrict	嘉兴路街道	Jiāxìnglù Jiēdào	ka xin lu ka do	125,634	2.63
Liangcheng Xincun Subdistrict	凉城新村街道	Liángchéng Xīncūn Jiēdào	lian zen sin tsen ka do	98,094	3.14
North Sichuan Road Subdistrict	四川北路街道	Sìchuān Běilù Jiēdào	sy tseu poq lu ka do	87,401	2.33
Ouyang Road Subdistrict	欧阳路街道	Ōuyánglù Jiēdào	oe yan lu ka do	73,328	1.67
Quyang Road Subdistrict	曲阳路街道	Qūyánglù Jiēdào	chioq yan lu ka do	102,564	3.05
Tilanqiao Subdistrict	提篮桥街道	Tílánqiáo Jiēdào	di leh djio ka do	113,751	2.36

== Huangpu District ==
Location of Huangpu District in the municipality

Huangpu District has ten subdistricts.

Name	Chinese (S)	Hanyu Pinyin	Shanghainese Romanization	Population (2010)	Area (km^{2})
Subdistricts
Bansongyuan Road Subdistrict	半淞园路街道	Bànsōngyuánlù Jiēdào	peu son yeu lu ka do	89,776	2.87
Central Huaihai Road Subdistrict	淮海中路街道	Huáihǎi Zhōnglù Jiēdào	wa he tzon lu ka do	57,931	1.41
Dapuqiao Subdistrict	打浦桥街道	Dǎpǔqiáo Jiēdào	dan phu djio ka do	59,085	1.59
East Nanjing Road Subdistrict	南京东路街道	Nánjīng Dōnglù Jiēdào	neu cin ton lu ka do	66,285	2.41
Laoximen Subdistrict	老西门街道	Lǎoxīmén Jiēdào	lo sij men ka do	72,898	1.24
Ruijin Second Road Subdistrict	瑞金二路街道	Ruìjīn Èrlù Jiēdào	zeu cin gnij lu ka do (often said as 瑞金两路街道 - zeu cin lian lu ka do)	49,360	1.98
Wuliqiao Subdistrict	五里桥街道	Wǔlǐqiáo Jiēdào	ng lij djio ka do	82,403	3.09
Xiaodongmen Subdistrict	小东门街道	Xiǎodōngmén Jiēdào	sio ton men ka do	74,994	2.59
Yuyuan Subdistrict	豫园街道	Yùyuán Jiēdào	yu yeu ka do	61,042	1.19

Note: Nanshi District and Luwan District were merged with the former Huangpu District in June 2000 and June 2011 respectively to form the current Huangpu District

== Jiading District ==
Location of Jiading District in the municipality

Jiading District has four subdistricts, seven towns and one special township-level division.

Name	Chinese (S)	Hanyu Pinyin	Shanghainese Romanization	Population (2010)	Area (km^{2})
Subdistricts
Jiadingzhen Subdistrict	嘉定镇街道	Jiādìngzhèn Jiēdào	ka din tzen ka do	81,854	4.10
Juyuan New Area Administrative Committee	菊园新区管委会	Júyuán Xīnqū Guǎn Wěihuì	cioq yeu sin chiu kueu we	60,924	18.61
Xincheng Road Subdistrict	新成路街道	Xīnchénglù Jiēdào	sin zen lu ka do	55,223	5.14
Zhenxin Subdistrict	真新街道	Zhēnxīn Jiēdào	tzen sin ka do	106,164	5.09
Towns
Anting Town	安亭镇	Āntíng Zhèn	eu din tzen	232,503	89.29
Huating Town	华亭镇	Huátíng Zhèn	wu din tzen	46,355	39.57
Jiangqqiao Town	江桥镇	Jiāngqiáo Zhèn	kaon djio tzen	256,218	42.37
Malu Town	马陆镇	Mǎlù Zhèn	mu loq tzen	172,864	57.16
Nanxiang Town	南翔镇	Nánxiáng Zhèn	neu zian tzen	139,845	33.31
Waigang Town	外冈镇	Wàigāng Zhèn	nga kaon tzen	80,896	50.95
Xuhang Town	徐行镇	Xúháng Zhèn	zi haon tzen	165,452	39.91
Special Township-Level Divisions
Jiading Industrial Zone	嘉定工业区	Jiādìng Gōngyèqū	ka din kon gniq chiu	72,933	78.10

== Jing'an District ==
Location of Jing'an District within Shanghai

Jing'an District has thirteen subdistricts and one town.

Name	Chinese (S)	Hanyu Pinyin	Shanghainese Romanization	Population (2010)	Area (km^{2})
Subdistricts
Beizhan Subdistrict	北站街道	Běizhàn Jiēdào	poq dze ka do	77,968	1.99
Baoshan Road Subdistrict	宝山路街道	Bǎoshānlù Jiēdào	po se lu ka do	80,726	1.62
Caojiadu Subdistrict	曹家渡街道	Cáojiādù Jiēdào	dzo ka du ka do	71,511	1.50
Daning Road Subdistrict	大宁路街道	Dànínglù Jiēdào	da gnin lu ka do	77,710	6.24
Gonghexin Road Subdistrict	共和新路街道	Gònghéxīnlù Jiēdào	gon wu sin lu ka do	97,630	2.72
Jiangning Road Subdistrict	江宁路街道	Jiāngnínglù Jiēdào	kaon gnin lu ka do	75,272	1.84
Jing'ansi Subdistrict	静安寺街道	Jìng'ānsì Jiēdào	dzin eu zy ka do	29,173	1.57
Linfen Road Subdistrict	临汾路街道	Línfénlù Jiēdào	lin ven lu ka do	78,079	2.12
Pengpu Xincun Subdistrict	彭浦新村街道	Péngpǔ Xīncūn Jiēdào	ban phu sin tsen ka do	156,276	3.83
Shimen Second Road Subdistrict	石门二路街道	Shímén Èrlù Jiēdào	zaq men gnij lu ka do (often said as 石门两路街道 - zaq men lian lu ka do)	34,288	1.09
West Nanjing Road Subdistrict	南京西路街道	Nánjīng Xīlù Jiēdào	neu cin sij lu ka do	36,544	1.62
West Tianmu Road Subdistrict	天目西路街道	Tiānmù Xīlù Jiēdào	ti moq sij lu ka do	34,749	1.94
West Zhijiang Road Subdistrict	芷江西路街道	Zhǐjiāng Xīlù Jiēdào	tzy kaon sij lu ka do	74,633	1.60
Towns
Pengpu Town	彭浦镇	Péngpǔ Zhèn	ban phu tzen	152,725	7.88

Note: Zhabei District was merged with the old Jing'an District to form the current Jing'an District in late 2015.

== Jinshan District ==
Location of Jinshan District in the municipality

Jinshan District has one subdistrict, nine towns and one special township-level division.

Name	Chinese (S)	Hanyu Pinyin	Shanghainese Romanization	Population (2010)	Area (km^{2})
Subdistricts
Shihua Subdistrict	石化街道	Shíhuà Jiēdào	zaq hau ka do	87,901	19.13
Towns
Caojing Town	漕泾镇	Cáojīng Zhèn	dzo cin tzen	40,722	44.92
Fengjing Town	枫泾镇	Fēngjīng Zhèn	fon cin tzen	82,477	91.67
Jinshanwei Town	金山卫镇	Jīnshānwèi Zhèn	cin se we tzen	70,819	54.93
Langxia Town	廊下镇	Lángxià Zhèn	laon rau tzen	33,658	46.56
Lüxiang Town	吕巷镇	Lǚxiàng Zhèn	liu raon tzen	52,808	59.74
Shanyang Town	山阳镇	Shānyáng Zhèn	se yan tzen	84,640	42.12
Tinglin Town	亭林镇	Tínglín Zhèn	din lin tzen	93,758	79.12
Zhangyan Town	张堰镇	Zhāngyàn Zhèn	tzan i tzen	37,057	35.15
Zhujing Town	朱泾镇	Zhūjīng Zhèn	tzyu zyu cin tzen	120,084	75.67
Special Township-Level Divisions
Jinshan Industry Zone	金山工业区	Jīnshān Gōngyèqū	cin se kon gniq chiu	28,514	58.00

== Minhang District ==
Location of Minhang District in the municipality

Minhang District has four subdistricts, nine towns and one special township-level division.

Name	Chinese (S)	Hanyu Pinyin	Shanghainese Romanization	Population (2010)	Area (km^{2})
Subdistricts
Gumei Road Subdistrict	古美路街道	Gǔměi lù Jiēdào	ku mhe lu ka do	149,141	6.51
Jiangchuan Road Subdistrict	江川路街道	Jiāngchuān lù Jiēdào	kaon tseu lu ka do	185,991	30.27
Pujing Subdistrict	浦锦街道	Pǔjǐn Zhèn	phu cin ka do	154,236	23.99
Xinhong Subdistrict	新虹街道	Xīnhóng Jiēdào	sin ron ka do	65,256	19.26
Towns
Hongqiao Town	虹桥镇	Hóngqiáo Zhèn	ron djio tzen	165,877	8.98
Huacao Town	华漕镇	Huácáo Zhèn	rau dzo tzen	193,777	46.28
Maqiao Town	马桥镇	Mǎqiáo Zhèn	mau djio tzen	103,989	33.20
Meilong Town	梅陇镇	Méilǒng Zhèn	me lon tzen	344,434	25.71
Qibao Town	七宝镇	Qībǎo Zhèn	tsiq po tzen	283,352	18.10
Pujiang Town	浦江镇	Pǔjiāng Zhèn	phu kaon tzen	126,474	78.51
Wujing Town	吴泾镇	Wújīng Zhèn	wu cin tzen	121,164	37.64
Xinzhuang Town	莘庄镇	Xīnzhuāng Zhèn	sen tzaon tzen	277,934	19.12
Zhuanqiao Town	颛桥镇	Zhuānqiáo Zhèn	tzeu djio tzen	189,604	20.97
Special Township-Level Divisions
Xinzhuang Industrial Zone	莘庄工业区	Xīnzhuāng Gōngyèqū	sen tzaon kon gniq chiu	56,103	17.88

Note: Shanghai County was merged with the old Minhang District to form the current Minhang District in 1992.

== Pudong New Area ==
Location of Pudong New Area in the municipality

Pudong New Area has twelve subdistricts, twenty-four towns and six special township-level divisions.

Name	Chinese (S)	Hanyu Pinyin	Shanghainese Romanization	Population (2010)	Area (km^{2})
Subdistricts
Dongming Road Subdistrict	东明路街道	Dōngmínglù Jiēdào	ton min lu ka do	121,449	5.95
Huamu Subdistrict	花木街道	Huāmù Jiēdào	hau moq ka do	221,327	20.93
Hudong Xincun Subdistrict	沪东新村街道	Hùdōng Xīncūn Jiēdào	vhu ton sin tsen ka do		
Jinyang Xincun Subdistrict	金杨新村街道	Jīnyáng Xīncūn Jiēdào	cin yan sin tsen ka do	206,017	8.02
Lujiazui Subdistrict	陆家嘴街道	Lùjiāzuǐ Jiēdào	loq ka tzyu ka do	112,507	6.89
Nanmatou Road Subdistrict	南码头路街道	Nánmǎtóulù Jiēdào	neu mau doe lu ka do	107,130	4.22
Puxing Road Subdistrict	浦兴路街道	Pǔxìnglù Jiēdào	phu xin lu ka do	177,468	6.25
Shanggang Xincun Subdistrict	上钢新村街道	Shànggāng Xīncūn Jiēdào	zaon kaon sin tsen ka do	104,932	7.54
Tangqiao Subdistrict	塘桥街道	Tángqiáo Jiēdào	daon djio ka do	76,916	3.86
Weifang Xincun Subdistrict	潍坊新村街道	Wéifāng Xīncūn Jiēdào	vij vaon sin tsen ka do	100,548	3.89
Yangjing Subdistrict	洋泾街道	Yángjīng Jiēdào	yan cin ka do	146,237	7.38
Zhoujiadu Subdistrict	周家渡街道	Zhōujiādù Jiēdào	tzoe ka du ka do	144,668	5.52
Towns
Beicai Town	北蔡镇	Běicài Zhèn	poq tsa tzen	276,547	24.91
Caolu Town	曹路镇	Cáolù Zhèn	dzo lu tzen	186,012	45.58
Chuanshaxin Town	川沙新镇	Chuānshāxīn Zhèn	tseu sa sau sin tzen	420,045	148.05
Datuan Town	大团镇	Dàtuán Zhèn	da deu tzen	71,162	50.45
Gaodong Town	高东镇	Gāodōng Zhèn	ko ton tzen	110,552	36.24
Gaohang Town	高行镇	Gāoháng Zhèn	ko raon tzen	137,625	22.85
Gaoqiao Town	高桥镇	Gāoqiáo Zhèn	ko djio tzen	184,486	38.73
Hangtou Town	航头镇	Hángtóu Zhèn	raon doe tzen	110,060	60.40
Heqing Town	合庆镇	Héqìng Zhèn	req chin tzen	132,038	41.97
Huinan Town	惠南镇	Huìnán Zhèn	we neu tzen	213,845	65.24
Jinqiao Town	金桥镇	Jīnqiáo Zhèn	cin djio tzen	81,537	25.28
Kangqiao Town	康桥镇	Kāngqiáo Zhèn	khaon djio tzen	174,672	41.25
Laogang Town	老港镇	Lǎogǎng Zhèn	lo kaon tzen	37,408	38.90
Nanhui Xincheng Town**	南汇新城镇	Nánhuì Xīnchéng Zhèn	neu we sin zen tzen	47,381	67.76
Nicheng Town	泥城镇	Níchéng Zhèn	gnij zen tzen	62,519	61.50
Sanlin Town	三林镇	Sānlín Zhèn	se lin tzen	360,516	34.19
Shuyuan Town	书院镇	Shūyuàn Zhèn	syu yeu tzen	59,323	66.90
Tang Town	唐镇	Tángzhèn	daon tzen	129,267	32.16
Wanxiang Town	万祥镇	Wànxiáng Zhèn	ve zian tzen	24,346	23.35
Xinchang Town	新场镇	Xīnchǎng Zhèn	sin dzan tzen	84,183	54.30
Xuanqiao Town	宣桥镇	Xuānqiáo Zhèn	si djio tzen	59,567	45.78
Zhangjiang Town	张江镇	Zhāngjiāng Zhèn	tzan kaon tzen	165,297	42.10
Zhoupu Town	周浦镇	Zhōupǔ Zhèn	tzoe phu tzen	147,329	42.60
Zhuqiao Town	祝桥镇	Zhùqiáo Zhèn	tzoq djio tzen	104,945	146.28
Special Township-Level Divisions
Chaoyang Farm	朝阳农场	Cháoyáng Nóngchǎng	dzo yan non dzan	862	10.67
Donghai Farm	东海农场	Dōnghǎi Nóngchǎng	ton he non dzan	508	15.20
Jinqiao Export Processing Zone	金桥经济技术开发区	Jīnqiáo Jīngjì Jìshù Kāifāqū	cin djio cin tzij djij dzeq khe faq chiu	5,514	67.79
Luchaogang Farm	芦潮港农场	Lúcháogǎng Nóngchǎng	lu dzo kaon non dzan	688	9.40
Waigaoqiao Free-Trade Zone	外高桥保税区	Wàigāoqiáo Bǎoshuìqū	nga ko djio po seu chiu	1,349	10.00
Zhangjiang Hi-Tech Park	张江高科技园区	Zhāngjiāng Gāo Kējì Yuánqū	tzan kaon ko khu djij yeu chiu	23,617	75.90

- * – Liuzao Town merged into Chuanshaxin Town.
- ** – Luchaogang Town and Shengang Subdistrict merged and form Nanhui Xincheng Town.

Note: Nanhui District and Chuansha County were merged with the Pudong New Area in May 2009 and 1993 respectively to form the current Pudong New Area.

== Putuo District ==
Location of Putuo District in the municipality

Putuo District has eight subdistricts and two towns.

Name	Chinese	Hanyu Pinyin	Shanghainese Romanization	Population (2010)	Area (km^{2})
Subdistricts
Caoyang Xincun Subdistrict	曹杨新村街道	Cáoyáng Xīncūn Jiēdào	dzo yan sin tsen ka do	98,267	1.36
Changfeng Xincun Subdistrict	长风新村街道	Chángfēng Xīncūn Jiēdào	dzan tzan fon sin tsen ka do	120,920	5.80
Changshou Road Subdistrict	长寿路街道	Chángshòulù Jiēdào	dzan tzan zoe lu ka do	128,647	3.98
Ganquan Road Subdistrict	甘泉路街道	Gānquánlù Jiēdào	keu dzi lu ka do	112,498	2.34
Shiquan Road Subdistrict	石泉路街道	Shíquánlù Jiēdào	zaq dzi lu ka do	120,217	3.48
Wanli Subdistrict	万里街道	Wànlǐ Jiēdào	ve lij ka do	105,728	3.30
Yichuan Road Subdistrict	宜川路街道	Yíchuānlù Jiēdào	gnij tseu lu ka do	111,185	2.22
Zhenruzhen Subdistrict	真如镇街道	Zhēnrúzhèn Jiēdào	tzen zyu tzen ka do	172,397	6.09
Towns
Changzheng Town	长征镇	Chángzhēng Zhèn	tzan tzen tzen	128,195	7.67
Taopu Town	桃浦镇	Táopǔ Zhèn	do phu tzen	194,825	18.84

== Qingpu District ==
Location of Qingpu District in the municipality

Qingpu District has three subdistricts and eight towns.

Name	Chinese (S)	Hanyu Pinyin	Shanghainese Romanization	Population (2010)	Area (km^{2})
Subdistricts
Xianghuaqiao Subdistrict	香花桥街道	Xiānghuāqiáo Jiēdào	xian hau djio ka do	106,830	69.45
Xiayang Subdistrict	夏阳街道	Xiàyáng Jiēdào	rau xia yan ka do	137,321	28.05
Yingpu Subdistrict	盈浦街道	Yíngpǔ Jiēdào	yin phu ka do	118,708	25.14
Towns
Baihe Town	白鹤镇	Báihè Zhèn	baq ngoq tzen	92,288	58.49
Chonggu Town	重固镇	Zhònggù Zhèn	dzon ku tzen	39,756	23.28
Huaxin Town	华新镇	Huáxīn Zhèn	rau sin tzen	153,203	47.60
Jinze Town	金泽镇	Jīnzé Zhèn	cin dzeq tzen	67,735	108.49
Liantang Town	练塘镇	Liàntáng Zhèn	li daon tzen	68,485	93.66
Xujing Town	徐泾镇	Xújīng Zhèn	zi cin tzen	127,936	38.59
Zhaoxiang Town	赵巷镇	Zhàoxiàng Zhèn	dzo raon tzen	74,409	36.35
Zhujiajiao Town	朱家角镇	Zhūjiājiǎo Zhèn	tzyu ka koq tzen	94,351	138.00
Special Township-Level Divisions
Qingdong Farm^{*}	青东农场	Qīngdōng Nóngchǎng			

- * – Qingdong Farm (Shanghai Prison for New Prisoners) is affiliated to Shanghai Prison Administration.

== Songjiang District ==
Location of Songjiang District in the municipality

Songjiang District has six subdistricts, eleven towns and three special township-level divisions.

Name	Chinese (S)	Hanyu Pinyin	Shanghainese Romanization	Population (2010)	Area (km^{2})
Subdistricts
Fangsong Subdistrict	方松街道	Fāngsōng Jiēdào	faon song ka do	414,548	14.76
Guangfulin Subdistrict	广富林街道	Guǎngfùlín Jiēdào	kuaon fu lin ka do	414,548	19.05
Jiuliting Subdistrict	九里亭街道	Jiǔlǐtíng Jiēdào	cioe lij din ka do	414,548	6.79
Yongfeng Subdistrict	永丰街道	Yǒngfēng Jiēdào	ion fon ka do	93,330	24.53
Yueyang Subdistrict	岳阳街道	Yuèyáng Jiēdào	ngoq yan ka do	112,671	5.65
Zhongshan Subdistrict	中山街道	Zhōngshān Jiēdào	tzon se ka do	98,888	26.34
Towns
Chedun Town	车墩镇	Chēdūn Zhèn	tsau ten tzen	167,687	45.30
Dongjing Town	洞泾镇	Dòngjīng Zhèn	don cin tzen	57,861	24.51
Jiuting Town	九亭镇	Jiǔtíng Zhèn	cioe din tzen	147,398	26.13
Maogang Town	泖港镇	Mǎogǎng Zhèn	mo kaon tzen	41,626	57.62
Sheshan Town	佘山镇	Shéshān Zhèn	sau se tzen	32,295	55.70
Shihudang Town	石湖荡镇	Shíhúdàng Zhèn	zaq wu daon tzen	44,011	44.28
Sijing Town	泗泾镇	Sìjīng Zhèn	sy cin tzen	94,279	23.98
Xiaokunshan Town	小昆山镇	Xiǎokūnshān Zhèn	sio khuen se tzen	51,606	30.52
Xinbang Town	新浜镇	Xīnbāng Zhèn	sin pan tzen	33,627	44.75
Xinqiao Town	新桥镇	Xīnqiáo Zhèn	sin djio tzen	155,856	31.43
Yexie Town	叶榭镇	Yèxiè Zhèn	yiq zia tzen	80,104	72.49
Special Township-Level Divisions
Sheshan Resort	佘山度假区	Shéshān Dùjiàqū	sau se du ka chiu	42,583	64.08
Shanghai Songjiang Export Processing Zone	上海松江出口加工区	Shànghǎi Sōngjiāng Chūkǒu Jiāgōngqū	zaon he son kaon tseq khoe ka kon chiu	60,797	2.98
Songjiang Industrial Zone	松江工业区	Sōngjiāng Gōngyèqū	son kaon kon gniq chiu	60,797	43.69

== Xuhui District ==
Location of Xuhui District in the municipality

Xuhui District has twelve subdistricts, one town and one special township-level division.

Name	Chinese (S)	Hanyu Pinyin	Shanghainese Romanization	Population (2010)	Area (km^{2})
Subdistricts
Caohejing Sudistrict	漕河泾街道	Cáohéjīng Jiēdào	dzo wu cin ka do	97,917	5.26
Changqiao Subdistrict	长桥街道	Chángqiáo Jiēdào	tzan djio ka do	118,872	15.3
Fenglin Road Subdistrict	枫林路街道	Fēnglínlù Jiēdào	fon lin lu ka do	112,400	2.69
Hongmei Road Subdistrict	虹梅路街道	Hóngméilù Jiēdào	ron me lu ka do	34,877	5.98
Hunan Road Subdistrict	湖南路街道	Húnánlù Jiēdào	wu neu lu ka do	36,281	1.72
Kangjian Xincun Subdistrict	康健新村街道	Kāngjiàn Xīncūn Jiēdào	khaon dji sin tsen ka do	100,444	4.07
Lingyun Road Subdistrict	凌云路街道	Língyún lù Jiēdào	lin yun lu ka do	108,582	3.58
Longhua Subdistrict	龙华街道	Lónghuá Jiēdào	lon rau ka do	85,769	6.53
Tianlin Subdistrict	田林街道	Tiánlín Jiēdào	di lin ka do	97,171	4.19
Tianping Road Subdistrict	天平路街道	Tiānpínglù Jiēdào	thi bin lu ka do	60,533	2.69
Xietu Road Subdistrict	斜土路街道	Xiétǔlù Jiēdào	zia thu lu ka do	69,710	2.67
Xujiahui Subdistrict	徐家汇街道	Xújiāhuì Jiēdào	zi ka we ka do	92,915	4.04
Towns
Huajing Town	华泾镇	Huájīng Zhèn	rau cin tzen	67,415	8.04
Special Township-Level Divisions
Caohejing Hi-Tech Park	漕河泾新兴技术开发区	Cáohéjīng Xīnxīng Jìshù Kāifāqū	dzo wu cin sin xin djij dzeq khe faq chiu	2,244	10.70

== Yangpu District ==
Location of Yangpu District in the municipality

Yangpu District has eleven subdistricts and one town.

Name	Chinese (S)	Hanyu Pinyin	Shanghainese Romanization	Population (2010)^{[6]}	Area (km^{2})
Subdistricts
Changbai Xincun Subdistrict	长白新村街道	Chángbái Xīncūn Jiēdào	tzan baq sin tsen ka do	70,195	3.05
Daqiao Subdistrict	大桥街道	Dàqiáo Jiēdào	da djio ka do	124,954	4.41
Dinghai Road Subdistrict	定海路街道	Dìnghǎilù Jiēdào	din he lu ka do	100,480	6.25
Jiangpu Road Subdistrict	江浦路街道	Jiāngpǔlù Jiēdào	kaon phu lu ka do	95,382	2.39
Kongjiang Subdistrict	控江路街道	Kòngjiānglù Jiēdào	khon cian kaon lu ka do	105,613	2.15
Pingliang Road Subdistrict	平凉路街道	Píngliánglù Jiēdào	bin lian lu ka do	85,870	3.41
Siping Road Subdistrict	四平路街道	Sìpínglù Jiēdào	sy bin lu ka do	92,505	2.64
Wujiaochang Subdistrict	五角场街道	Wǔjiǎochǎng Jiēdào	ng koq dzan ka do	149,090	7.66
Xinjiangwancheng Subdistrict	新江湾城街道	Xīnjiāngwānchéng Jiēdào	sin kaon ue zen ka do	27,251	8.68
Yanji Xincun Subdistrict	延吉新村街道	Yánjí Xīncūn Jiēdào	yi ciq sin tsen ka do	90,334	2.04
Yinhang Subdistrict	殷行街道	Yīnháng Jiēdào	in raon ka do	192,554	9.52
Changhai Road Subdistrict	长海路街道	Changhailu Jiedao		178,994	8.77
