= Revolutionary Bodies =

2018 non-fiction book by Emily Wilcox

Revolutionary Bodies: Chinese Dance and the Socialist Legacy is a 2018 non-fiction book by Emily Wilcox (Chinese: 魏美玲; pinyin: Wèi Měilíng), published by University of California Press. It discusses Dance in China.

Rowan McClelland of University of Roehampton described it as "the first English language monograph documenting dance in the People's Republic of China (PRC)."

Fangfei Miao of the University of California, Los Angeles described the book as "a significant introduction of Chinese dance to English readers."

== Background ==
For about 1.5 years Wilcox had taken dance courses at the Beijing Dance Academy. She did her field work for the book at the academy. She conducted interviews with people researching dance and people active in the dance and dance education fields; those interviews number over 100. She spent over 10 years doing her research.

She became an employee at the University of Michigan, which she did as an associate modern Chinese studies professor, beginning in 2013, and ending in 2020. As of 2022 she is at College of William & Mary as a tenured professor.

At one time she heard pro-Shen Yun persons tell her that authentic Chinese dance was not permitted in Communist-ruled Mainland China, an assertion that Wilcox described as "hilarious to me, and so ridiculous"; this was one factor that resulted in her writing Revolutionary Bodies.

== Contents ==
The introduction describes pre-Communist Party dance styles and practitioners. Nellie Yu Roung Ling and Mei Lanfang are described in the introduction. The only portion of the book describing pre-Communist Party dance is the introduction. The book's coverage begins in the 1935 and ends in 2015, with time being used as the way to organize the content from earliest to latest.

The first chapter covers early 20th century dance, and has a focus on the life of Dai Ailian. Soo Ryon Yoon (Hanja: 尹水蓮, Hangul: 윤수련) of Lingnan University wrote that Wilcox, partly through the content about Dai, "shows that Chinese dance interconnects with theatre traditions".

The second chapter covers the late 1940s and the initial part of the 1950s, and has a focus on Choi Seung-hee, a Korean who helped develop dance in China. The third chapter describes the rise of national dance drama in the 1950s and 1960s in Communist China. Further information on dance in Communist China before the Cultural Revolution is in the fourth chapter. Chapter 5 has information on dance in the 1970s and the beginning of the 1980s. The peacock dance of Yang Liping is described in that chapter.

Chapter 6 describes dance in China right up to the time of the publication of the book. It discusses the Belt and Road program but does not explicitly describe political implications.

The eBook version has QR codes that lead to video files of dancing.

== Release ==
Wilcox held a book release event in Beijing. The event poster stated that the content of the book was a discussion on "modern and contemporary Chinese dance" (中国现当代舞蹈 Zhōngguó xiàndāngdài Wǔdǎo) as a clarification of what Wilcox meant by Chinese dance.

== Reception ==
Ziying Cui of Temple University praised the "groundbreaking research" and "eminent readability."

Xing Fan of the University of Toronto praised the "meticulous descriptions and analyses of body language and movement convention and vocabulary".

SanSan Kwan of the University of California Berkeley wrote that the book "fills an enormous vacancy in English-language historiographies of Chinese dance." She praised how the author having "impressive tact in respecting Chinese dance on its own terms" instead of "looking for political critique in every work of contemporary Chinese art" as often is common with reviewers from Western countries. Kwan argued that "acceptability to mainland Chinese scholars is paramount" due to the work's importance in documenting Chinese dance.

Liang Luo (Chinese: 羅靚; pinyin: Luó Liàng) of the University of Kentucky overall praised the book, stating it "is poised to make a lasting contribution" to Chinese studies fields in general; Luo stated that the title may make people think the work would discuss all forms of Chinese dance when it discusses the specific kinds of dance that developed in the beginning of the People's Republic of China.

McClelland praised the book for being "impressive", "thorough and rigorous". McClelland added that the book has a style of its composition and its subject coverage that is "innovative", referring to the QR codes.

Miao stated that dance scholars in Mainland China may dispute Wilcox's definition of "Chinese dance".

Chiayi Seetoo (司徒嘉怡; Sītú Jiāyí) of Shanghai Theatre Academy wrote that the book "promises to be an important reference" in its fields, and Seetoo praised the "well chosen" still images of video clips and photographs.
