= Mildred Barnes Griggs =

American academic (1942–2025)

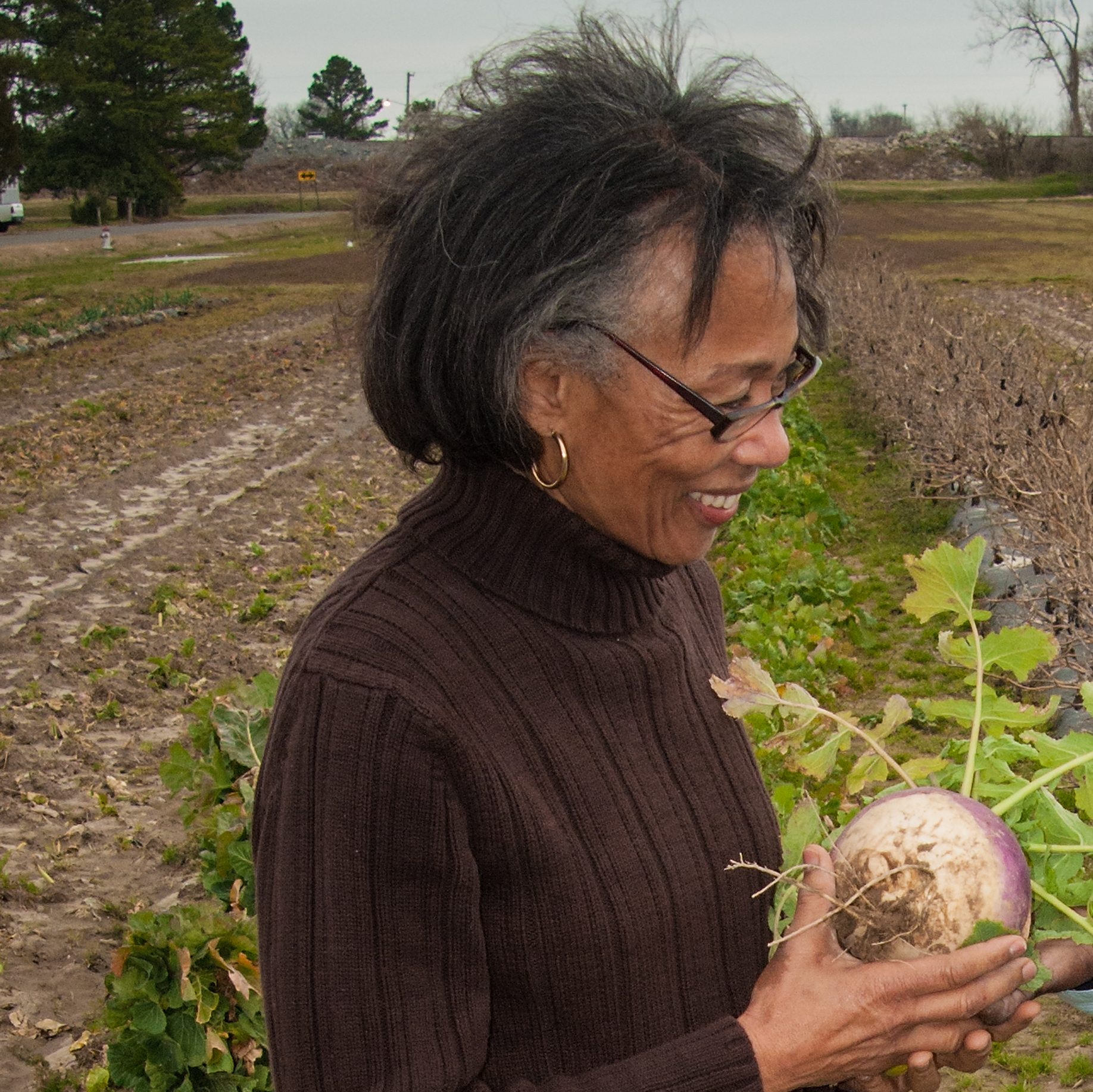
- Mildred Barnes Griggs in 2013
- Born: Mildred Barnes; March 11, 1942; Marianna, Arkansas, US
- Died: July 28, 2025 (aged 83)
- Occupation: Academic

Mildred Barnes Griggs (nee Barnes; March 11, 1942 – July 28, 2025) was an American academic. She had a long career at the University of Illinois College of Education at which she was the first Black dean.

== Biography ==
Mildred Barnes Griggs was born in Mariana, Arkansas. She was one of ten children and grew up on a cotton farm. She earned her undergraduate degree at the University of Arkansas at Pine Bluff and earned her master's degree and doctorate from the University of Illinois at Urbana-Champaign.

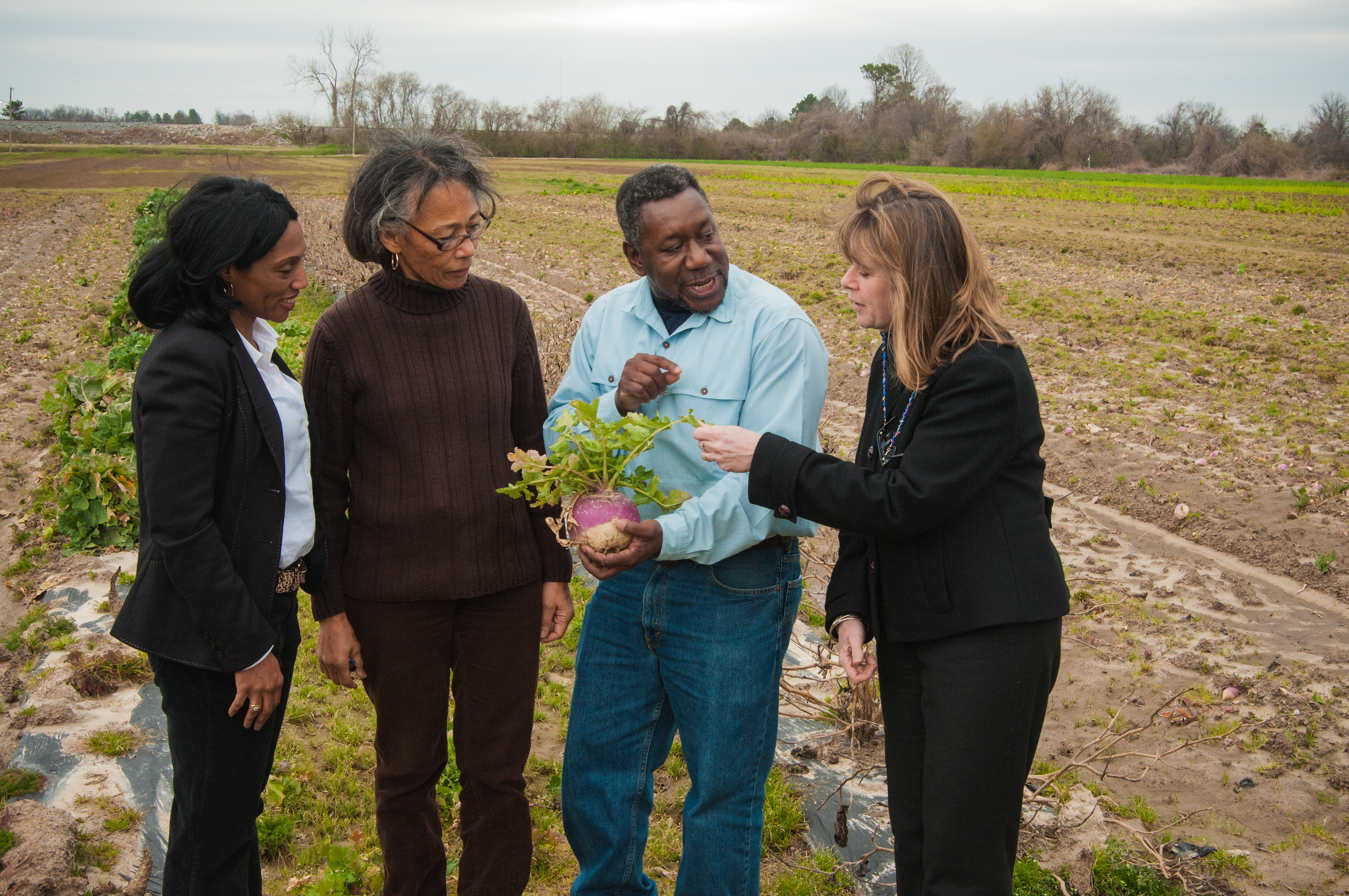
Griggs (second from left) at the East Arkansas Enterprise Community in 2013

Griggs was the first black assistant professor to become a full professor at the University of Illinois Urbana-Champaign. She later became the first Black dean of University of Illinois College of Education. With the Eastern Arkansas Economic Council, she advocated for black farmers for access to land, loans, and insurance by the United States Department of Agriculture. Griggs was named the 2006 S. A. Haley Lecturer at the 50th Annual Rural Life Conference sponsored by the School of Agriculture, Fisheries and Human Sciences at UAPB. Griggs was named at the Arkansas Black Hall of Fame.

She and her husband, Alvin Scott Griggs, had two sons and two grandchildren. Griggs died on July 28, 2025.
