= College of Education (University of Illinois Urbana-Champaign) =

College of the University of Illinois

Coordinates: 40°6′7.6″N 88°13′46.7″W

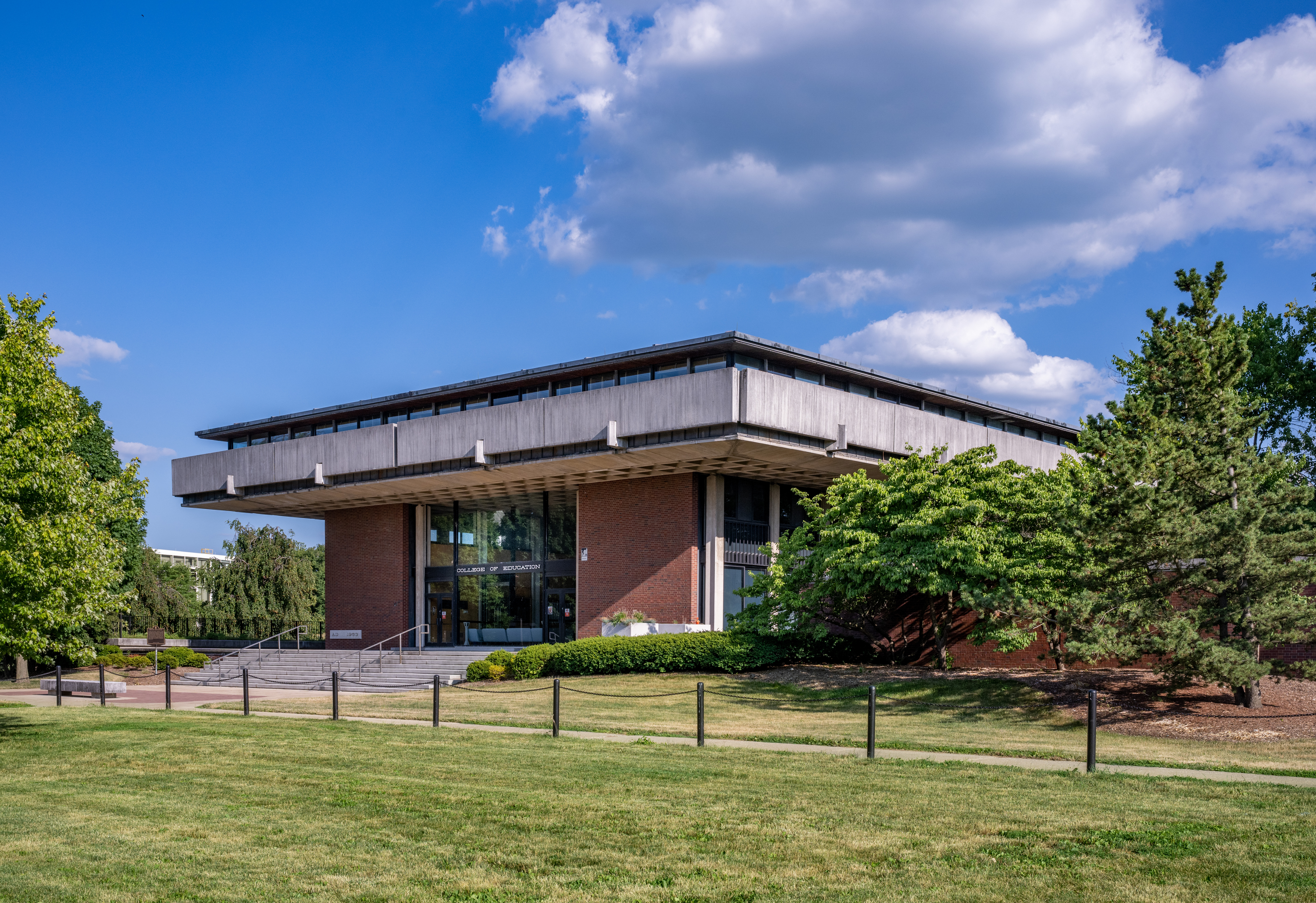
- College of Education
- Established: 1905
- Parent institution: University of Illinois Urbana-Champaign
- Dean: Chrystalla Mouza
- Academic staff: 135
- Undergraduates: 728
- Postgraduates: 1,538
- Location: Champaign, Illinois, United States
- Website: education.illinois.edu

The College of Education is the undergraduate and graduate education school of the University of Illinois Urbana-Champaign. It was founded in 1905 and took on its current name in 1918 after previously being known as the School of Education. The college offers undergraduate, graduate, and online programs in areas including elementary education, early childhood education, special education, and Educational Organization and Leadership. It began with six departments; three of them merged and formed the largest department in the college. All departments offer masters and doctoral degrees. However, only two departments offer undergraduate degree programs: Special Education and Curriculum & Instruction. The college also offers 16 online programs. Students seeking an undergraduate degree in the college must meet the minimum graduation requirement set forth by the university. To obtain a certification, students must also meet the requirements of the Council on Teacher Education, a professional educational administration at the University of Illinois. The total enrollment is 1,361 students as of 2015.

== Campus ==
The main building of the College of Education is the Education building, which is located on the south quadrangle of the campus, near the Krannert Art Museum. The Education Building was built in 1964 and designed by the university architectural professor A. Richard Williams.

In 1916, a new building was to be erected for the School of Education,later to be the first College of Education Building. It would be Collegiate Gothic in design and located on the corner of Springfield and Mathews in Urbana. Today the building is home to University Laboratory High School.

The College of Education operates a Pre - 5th Grade Reggio Emilia Inspired Laboratory School named University Primary School. University Primary School provides a setting for College of Education faculty and students to demonstrate, observe, study, and teach best practices in early childhood and gifted education.

== Departments ==
The College of Education began with six departments.

- Curriculum and Instruction
- Special Education
- Educational Psychology
- Human Resource Education
- Education Policy Studies
- Educational Organization and Leadership

The departments of Education Policy Studies, Human Resource Education, and Educational Organization and Leadership merged and became what is known as now the Department of Education Policy, Organization and Leadership.

=== Curriculum and Instruction ===
The Department of Curriculum and Instruction prepares students on the issues of teaching, learning, and child development. This department is ranked #12 in the nation, according to U.S. News & World Report.

=== Special Education ===
The Department of Special Education focuses on the education of students with intellectual and learning disabilities from birth to age 21. This department is ranked #7 in the nation, according to U.S. News & World Report.

Dr. Samuel Kirk, known to some as "the father of Special Education" was a faculty member of the College. Kirk founded the Institute for Research on Exceptional Children in 1952 to increase knowledge about exceptional children and improve the effectiveness of special education programs by conducting systematic, longitudinal, and comprehensive interdisciplinary research.

In 1963, in a speech to an education conference, Professor Kirk coined and defined the term “learning disabilities.” His speech had led to major impact on social policies and provided a framework and language for this new academic field.

Through his research he concluded that early education can increase intelligence, a discovery which led to the creation of Head Start, a federally-funded program that provides educational, health, and social services to underprivileged preschoolers to this day.

Kirk was appointed by President Lyndon B. Johnson's administration in 1964 as the founding director of the Division of Handicapped Children and Youth under the U.S. Office of Education.

=== Educational Psychology ===
The Department of Educational Psychology offers graduate program in the study of how students learn in different educational environments. This department is ranked #7 in the nation, according to U.S. News & World Report.

=== Department of Education Policy, Organization and Leadership ===
The Department of Education Policy, Organization and Leadership offers study mainly on the rules and regulations that governs the proceeding of a learning environment. There are also nine online programs available for on-campus or international students. The department is one of the largest in the college, with over 380 graduate students on campus and 1,800 students enrolled in the on-line programs.

== Academic programs ==
=== Undergraduate programs ===
The college offers 11 undergraduate majors:

- Computer Science + Education: Learning Sciences
- Computer Science + Education: Secondary Education*
- Digital Environments for Learning, Teaching, & Agency (DELTA)
- Early Childhood Education*
- Elementary Education*
- Learning & Behavior Specialist I*
- Learning & Education Studies: Digital Environments for Learning, Teaching and Agency
- Learning & Education Studies: Educational Equity & Cultural Understanding
- Learning & Education Studies: Workplace Training & Development
- Middle Grades Education*
- Secondary Education: Mathematics*

Additionally the College partners with The Grainger College of Engineering and the College of Liberal Arts and Sciences to prepare teachers who want to teach high school with the Secondary Education Minor*. These students major in:

- Biology
- Chemistry
- Geology/Earth Science
- English
- History/Social Science
- Mathematics
- Physics

* - Indicates licensure option

=== Graduate programs ===
All four of the college departments offer on-campus master's and doctoral degrees to graduate students.

- Cognitive Science of Teaching & Learning (CSTL)
- Counseling Psychology
- Curriculum Research, Early Childhood Education, Aesthetics & Teacher Education (CREATE)
- Development Sciences
- Digital Environments for Learning, Teaching, & Agency (DELTA)
- Diversity & Equity in Education
- Early Childhood Education Plus Teaching Licensure
- Global Studies in Education
- Higher Education
- History of Education
- Human Resource Development
- Infancy & Early Childhood Special Education
- Language & Literacy
- Learning & Behavior Specialist I (LSBI)
- Learning & Behavior Specialist II (LSBII in Multiple Disabilities)
- Learning Design & Leadership
- Mathematics, Science & Engineering Education (MSE)
- Ph.D. in Special Education
- Philosophy of Education
- Quantitative and Qualitative Methodology Measurement and Evaluation (QUERIES)
- Secondary Education: English Plus Teaching Licensure
- Secondary Education: Mathematics Plus Teaching Licensure
- Secondary Education: Science Plus Teaching Licensure
- Secondary Education: Social Studies Plus Teaching Licensure
- Social Sciences & Education Policy

=== Online programs ===
The college offers 19 online programs. Students can obtain online master's degree in programs including:

- Bilingual/Bi-Cultural
- Digital Learning
- Diversity & Equity in Education
- Global Studies in Education
- Human Resource Development
- Instructional Design, Technology, & Organization
- International Education Administration & Leadership
- Learning Design & Leadership
- Perspectives and Practices
- Teaching Biology
- Trauma-Informed Education

In addition the college offers a hybrid degree in Educational Administration and Leadership Principal endorsement.

=== Graduate Certificates ===
Education at Illinois also offers various graduate certificates. These are post-baccalaureate credentials that explore and provide more learning opportunities in specific fields. Multiple graduate certificates could be stacked and used to complete a masters degree. The College of Education offers these in the following subjects:

- Bilingual/Bi-Cultural
- Cancer Education and Management in Underrepresented & Diverse Communities (CEMUDC)
- Community College Leadership
- Digital Learning
- Diversity & Equity in Education
- Early Intervention
- Global Studies in Education
- Human Resource Development
- Instructional Design MasterTrack
- Instructional Design Management and Leadership (ISDML)
- International Education Administration & Leadership
- Leadership and Equity
- Learning Design & Leadership
- Middle Grades Certificate
- Online Teaching in Higher Education Environment
- Technology Specialist
- Trauma-Informed Education

== Office of International Programs ==
=== Greater China Initiative ===
The Greater China Initiative was established in the 2012-2013 academic year to enable a staff member of the college to based in Shanghai, China to "advance both the global influence and the international impact of the College of Education by promoting faculty expertise, undergraduate and graduate degree programs, non-degree certificate programs, contract projects, and alumni events [in the region]." The initiative is partially supported by the Yew Chung Education Foundation which has allowed a Teach in China study abroad cohort composed of undergraduate and graduate students to teach for three to six weeks at Yew Wah School of Shanghai which is located in the Changning District of Shanghai.

== Requirements ==
=== Admissions ===
Freshmen who applied to the college are all admitted to the Pre-Early Childhood, Pre-Elementary Education, Pre-Special Education curriculum. Elementary education and early childhood education (academic programs in the Department of curriculum and instruction) requires Junior standing with at least 60 hours of coursework. The special education program requires student to have at least 30 hours by the end of freshmen year.

=== Graduation ===
Undergraduate students must satisfy the University graduation requirement as well as the requirement set forth by the Council on Teacher Education. Student teaching is also required and must be completed at the University of Illinois at Urbana-Champaign. Depending on the curriculum chosen, students must complete a minimum of 125 to 129 credit hours to graduate. Upon completion of these requirements, students will receive certification to teach. Each certification varies depending on the programs of study.

== Research ==
The college has a wide range of research topics from Early Childhood Development to Management & Leadership. It also has the following nationwide research centers and outreach units:

- Office of Community College Research and Leadership
- Early Childhood and Parenting Collaborative
- Illinois New Teacher Collaborative
- Office of Mathematics, Science and Technology Education (MSTE)
- National Center for Engineering and Technology Education (NCETE)
- University Primary School
- Center for Culturally Responsive Evaluation and Assessment (CREA)
- Inclusive and Intelligent Technologies for Education (INVITE) Institute

== Events ==
The College of Education hosts the annual Van Miller Distinguished Scholar Practitioner Award in Springfield. This award is given to those who have presented excellence in the field of education in the states of Illinois. The selection of the recipients is made by college administration alumni and professors.

== See also ==
- National Council for Accreditation of Teacher Education
