= Datuan =

Datuan may refer to these towns in China:

- Datuan, Shandong, in Rongcheng, Shandong
- Datuan, Shanghai
