= Museums in Changning District, Shanghai =

Museums in Shanghai, China

Museums in Changning District, Shanghai comprise a diverse group of public and private institutions. According to the official resource, as of 2022, there are eight registered museums in this area.

== List of Registered Museums ==
Below is a list of museums in Changning District, Shanghai and where they are located.

- Shanghai Children’s Museum – 61 Songyuan Road.
- Song Qingling Memorial Residence in Shanghai – 21 Songyuan Road.
- Shanghai Fire Museum – 229 Zhongshan West Road.
- Shanghai Textile and Costume Museum of Donghua University – 1882 Yan’an West Road.
- Shanghai Ningjuli Project Museum – 878 Changning Road.
- Shanghai Art Collection Museum – 1731 Yan’an West Road, inside Tianshan Park.
- Shanghai Bell Museum – 91 Huangjincheng Avenue.
- Changning Revolutionary Relics Exhibition Hall – 1376 Yuyuan Road.

== See also ==
- List of Museums in China
