= Shanghai Art Collection Museum =

- 上海艺术品博物馆
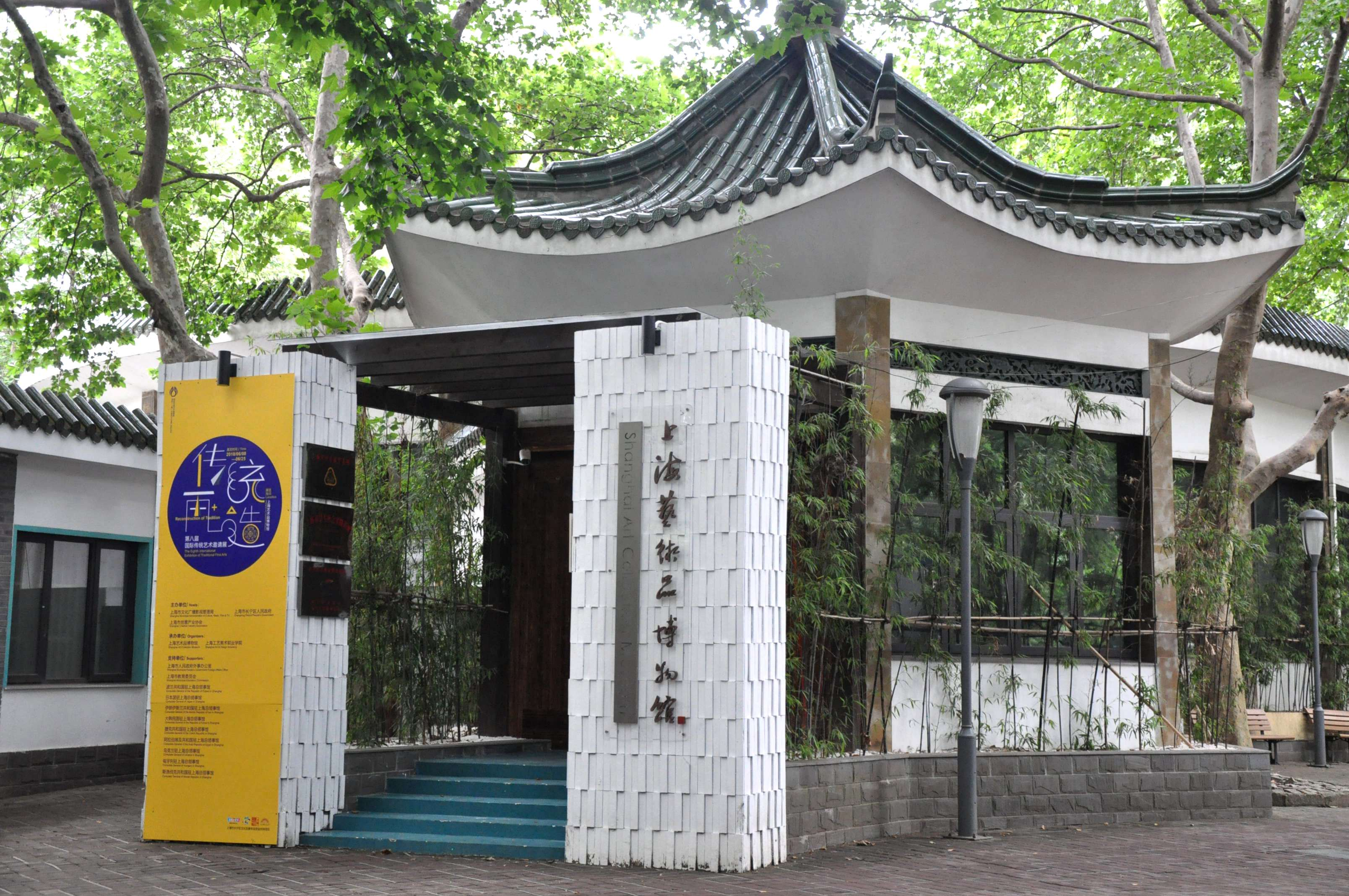

- Location within Shanghai
- Established: 2009
- Location: 1731 West Yan'an Road, Tianshan Park, Shanghai, China, 200051
- Coordinates: 31.21271°N 121.41005°E
- Type: Art Museum
- Public transit access: Yan'an West Road Station on Line 3 or Line 4 (Shanghai Metro)
- Website: http://www.sh-art.org.cn/

The Shanghai Art Collection Museum (SACM, Chinese: 上海艺术品博物馆) is a museum located inside Tianshan Park, at 1731 West Yan'an Road, Changning District, Shanghai, China. Dedicated to the collection and exhibition of artworks, the museum officially opened to the public on 22 September 2009.

According to the National Cultural Heritage Administration in October 2025, the museum currently holds 339 items or sets of artifacts, has organized 17 exhibitions, conducted 168 educational activities, and received approximately 79,586 visitors.

The museum is governed by a board of directors, chaired by Muqing Hu.

The Shanghai Art Collection Museum is a member of the International Council of Museums (ICOM) and the Chinese Museums Association. It is recognized as a 5A-level social organization, a Shanghai Student Social Practice Base, a Shanghai Science Education Base, and a Shanghai Public Welfare Base.

It is also included in the statistical sample of specialized thematic museums maintained by the National Cultural Heritage Administration and the Shanghai Municipal Administration of Culture and Tourism.

The museum further serves as a vice-president unit of the Shanghai Creative Industry Association, president unit of the Changning District Art Museums Association, vice-chair unit of the Changning Federation of Literary and Art Circles, and has been recognized as an Outstanding Yangtze River Delta Science Popularization Volunteer Organization.

The museum has organized a number of internationally influential exhibitions and cultural activities, such as the International Exhibition of Traditional Fine Arts, the International Children's Creative Art Exhibition, the International Youth and Children's Science and Art Exhibition, and the Chinese Traditional Art International Touring Exhibition.

== Exhibitions and events ==
Since its establishment, the Shanghai Art Collection Museum has organized a wide range of exhibitions and cultural activities that have received extensive attention both in China and abroad. Representative projects include the Yang Liping Costume Exhibition; the Liang Family (Liang Qichao) Art Collection Exhibition; the Chen Peiqiu Calligraphy and Painting Exhibition; the Liang Sicheng and Lin Huiyin Manuscript and Art Exhibition; the International Traditional Art Invitational Exhibition (held annually for fifteen consecutive sessions); the International (Shanghai) Intangible Cultural Heritage Protection Forum (thirteen sessions); the International (Shanghai) Cultural Tourism Promotion Special Event; the International Children's Creative Art Exhibition (ten sessions); the Chinese Traditional Art International Touring Exhibition (staged in Alexandria, Istanbul, Bratislava, and Casablanca); the International Youth Science and Art Exhibition (seven sessions); as well as themed exhibitions such as the Turkish Photography Exhibition; Indonesian Art Exhibition; China–Slovakia Joint Art Exhibition; Iranian Miniature Exhibition; China–Iran Youth Art Exchange Exhibition; Indonesian Art Exhibition; Iranian Carpet Exhibition; Persian Miniature Exhibition.

Among these, the International Traditional Art Invitational Exhibition, the International Intangible Cultural Heritage Protection Forum, and the Chinese Traditional Art International Touring Exhibition have been officially included in the "Shanghai Culture" Brand Projects and the Three-Year Cultural Action Plan launched by the Shanghai Municipal Committee and Municipal Government. The museum has also been repeatedly commissioned by national and municipal authorities to host international cultural exchange programs and exhibitions.

In April 2025, the Shanghai Art Collection Museum held an exhibition to commemorate the 460th anniversary of William Shakespeare's birth, named Transformation Shakespeare into Gold.

In June 2025, the Shanghai Art Collection Museum organized a memorial exhibition for Nobel laureate Pearl S. Buck at the Shanghai Library.

In July 2025, the museum organized an exhibition titled Miles Apart, Close at Heart in partnership with the Jakarta provincial government, showcases the journeys of Admiral Cheng Ho from China's Ming dynasty.

== Collections ==
The Shanghai Art Collection Museum houses a number of rare artworks and artifacts. Notable items include a sample of the Duanxi Inkstone with Drum Design, which was presented by former Chinese President Hu Jintao to former Japanese Prime Minister Yasuo Fukuda; an annotated copy of Selections of Refined Literature (Wenxuan) by Prince Chengzhe of the Qing dynasty; Liang Qichao's calligraphic masterpiece Imitation of the Stele of Zhang Qian; a biography of Albert Einstein bearing his autograph; the manuscript of Liang Sicheng's seminal work History of Chinese Sculpture; an early design draft of the National Emblem of the People's Republic of China created by Lin Huiyin; and the Peacock Dress of dancer Yang Liping.

In addition to these highlights, the museum preserves a distinctive collection of the Liang Qichao family archives, hundreds of ancient Chinese and foreign rare books, and numerous works by prominent Chinese painters and national arts-and-crafts masters. The museum also holds artworks from artists across dozens of countries—including Japan, South Korea, the United Kingdom, Turkey, the United States, Austria, Poland, Russia, Israel, Egypt, Iran, Ukraine, and Lithuania—making it one of the Chinese institutions with the largest number of art pieces from nations along the Belt and Road Initiative.

== International exchange ==
The Shanghai Art Collection Museum has established close partnerships with organizations in over sixty countries worldwide and has undertaken collaborative projects with numerous renowned institutions, including the Ministry of Culture and Tourism of Turkey, the Ministry of Education, Culture, Research and Technology of Indonesia, the Supreme Council of Antiquities of Egypt, the Alexandria Governorate, the University of Oxford, the Turkmenistan Government, the New York Public Library, and among others.

Following an announcement during British Prime Minister Keir Starmer's 2026 state visit to China, National Museums Liverpool is scheduled to host a major exhibition of folk art and Peking Opera masks from the Shanghai Art Collection Museum in October 2026, marking the Liverpool-Shanghai twin-city partnership.

== Selected publications ==
Images and Manuscripts of Liang Sicheng and Lin Huiyin (Chinese: 梁思成 林徽因影像与手稿珍集). ISBN 978-7-5326-5363-8

== See also ==
- List of Museums in China
- Museums in Changning District, Shanghai
