= Hangtou =

Hangtou may refer to the following towns in China:

- Hangtou, Shanghai
- Hangtou, Zhejiang, in Jiande, Zhejiang
