= Shanghai Yan'an High School =

- 上海市延安中学

Location
- 1111 Maotai Road; Shanghai; China

Information
- Type: Public secondary school
- Motto: 自信，自强，自主，自立; Confidence, Self-improving, Independence, Self-reliance
- Established: 1946
- School district: Changning
- Enrollment: Around 1500
- Campus: 100,000 square metres (25 acres)
- Colour: Dark green
- Website: shyahs.chneic.sh.cn

Shanghai Yan'an High School is a public secondary school in Changning, Shanghai, China.

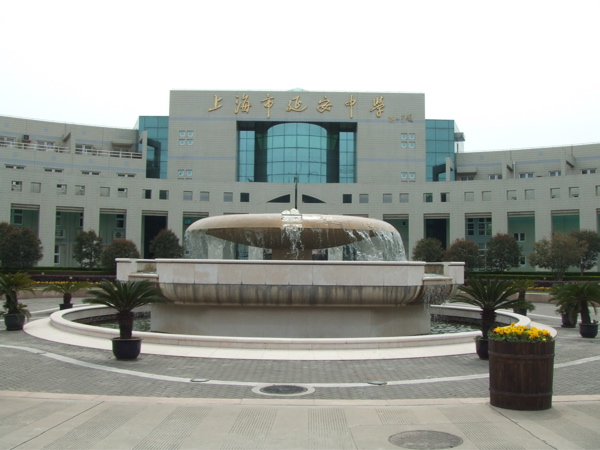
