= Kaiqiao Green Area =

Park in Shanghai, China

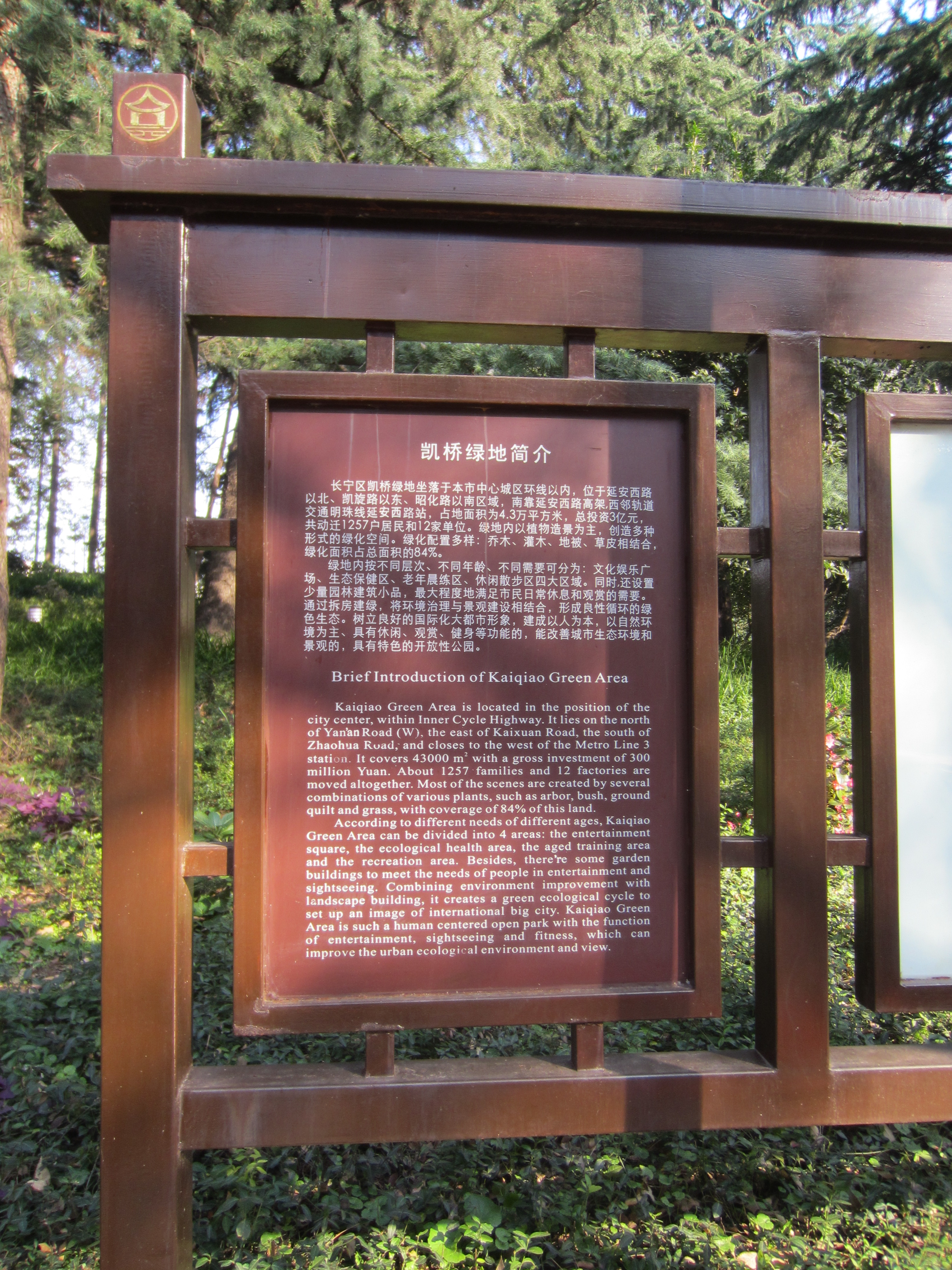
- Park signage
- Interactive map of Kaiqiao Green Area
- Location: Shanghai, China

Kaiqiao Green Area is a park in Shanghai, China. It is located in the Changing District, the Liahaisu Art Museum is located within the park.

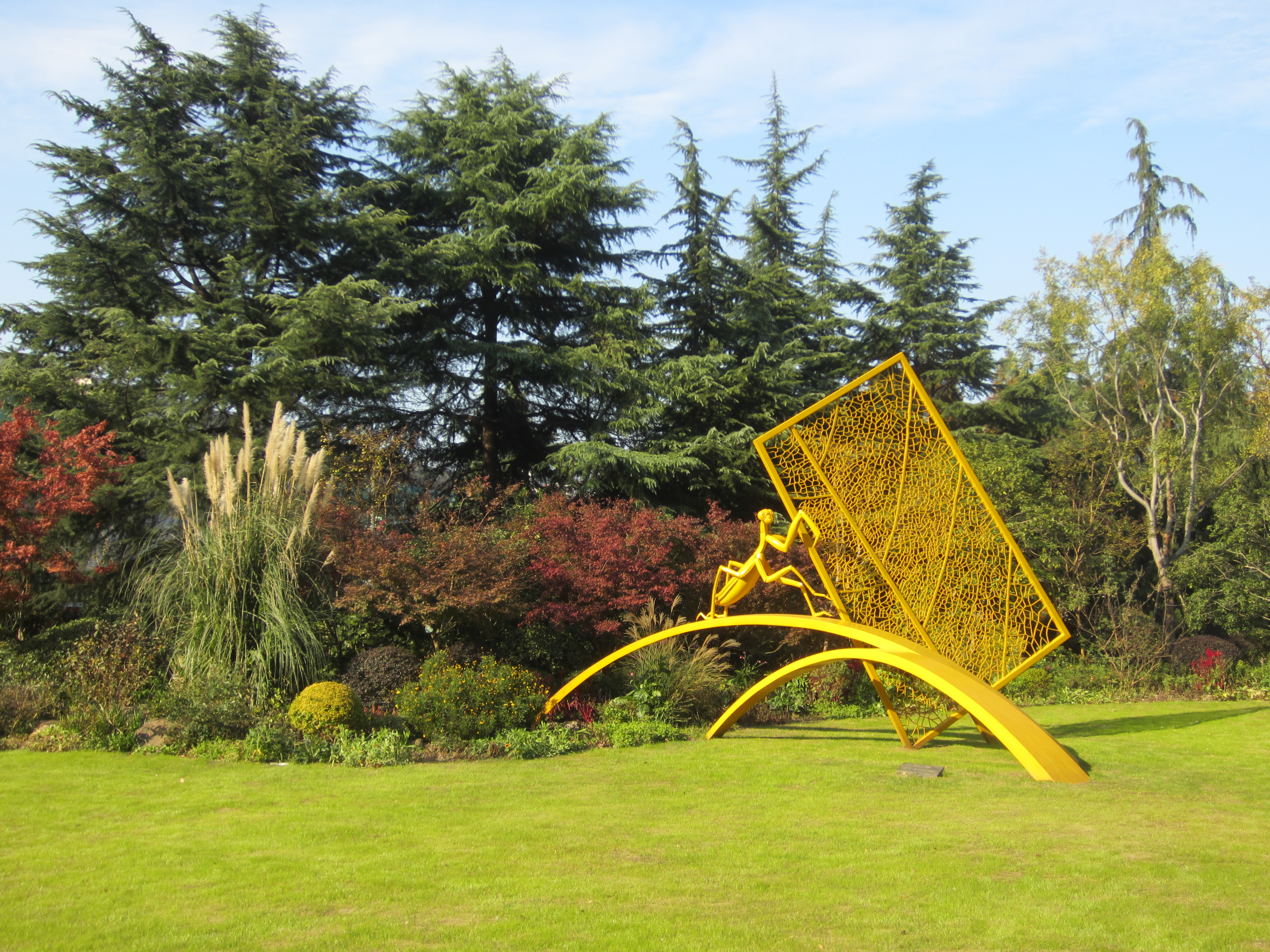
Sculpture in the park

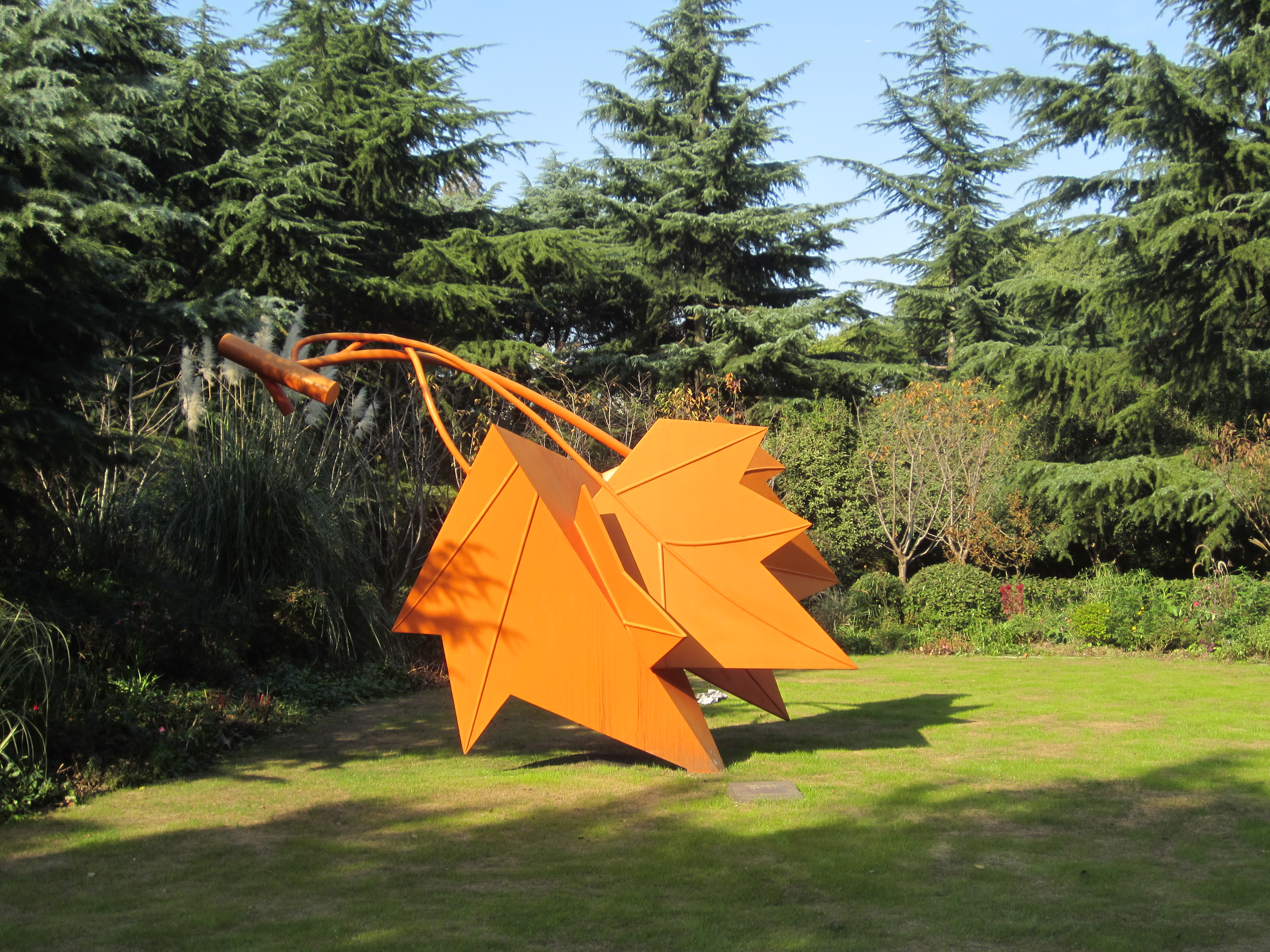
Sculpture in the park
