= Regan Garden =

Historical building in Changning, Shanghai, China

- 罗别根花园
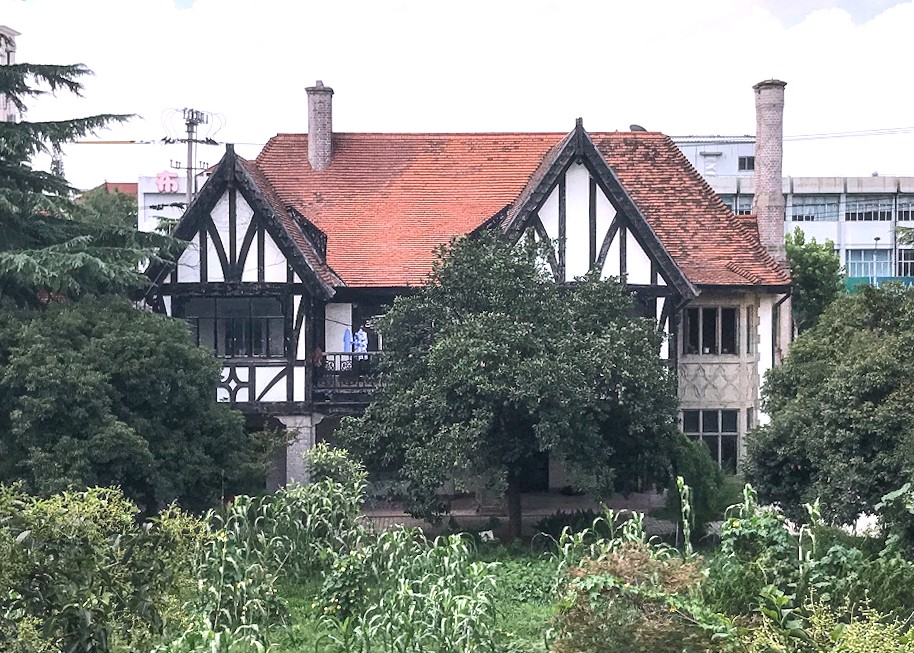
- Regan Garden in 2017
- Interactive map of the Regan Garden area

General information
- Location: 2310 Hongqiao Road, Changning, Shanghai, China
- Coordinates: 31°11′31″N 121°22′00″E
- Year built: 1931

Regan Garden (simplified Chinese: 罗别根花园; traditional Chinese: 羅別根花園; pinyin: Luóbiégēn Huāyuán) is a building in Changning, Shanghai. Built in 1931, the building was the home of hotelier Victor Sassoon until the Second Sino-Japanese War, when it was occupied by various forces. After its last owner moved to Hong Kong in 1956, several companies leased the property to serve as their headquarters, before it was made an outstanding historic building in 1989.

== History ==
During the early 1900s, foreigners could not own land outside the Shanghai International Settlement. In order to circumvent this rule, E. D. Sassoon & Co.—under the auspices of chairman and hotelier Victor Sassoon—founded Da-chung, a shell corporation under Xin Ding-chen, a local employee, in the late 1920s. The company then bought 8.1 ha (20 acres) of land near modern-day Hongqiao Road and 42 ha (104 acres) in Chengjiaqiao in 1930, upon which Regan Garden was constructed in 1931.

The National Revolutionary Army occupied the property after the Battle of Shanghai in 1937, until the Imperial Japanese Forces seized control during the 1941 Pacific War. To raise funds, the Garden was then sold and went through a series of short-lived owners, before being acquired by the Yin-feng Textile Company.

Sassoon returned to Shanghai following the Chinese victory in 1945, seeking to repossess the Garden. However, Yin-feng, which had acquired the property through legal means, refused to give up ownership. Sassoon believed that as it was initially unlawfully occupied by the Japanese, it should be returned to him following their defeat. He maintained close ties with authorities in Suzhou, Zhejiang, and Anhui, and eventually received official certification that he was the lawful owner. Yin-feng, citing the Settlement law barring foreigners from owning land, sued Sassoon, with local courts ruling in their favour. Initially planning to appeal the decision, Sassoon conceded the loss after the communist forces gained control of Shanghai.

Yin-feng's owner and their family moved to Hong Kong in 1956, and the nationally-owned Shanghai Textile Corporation seized the Garden soon after, which was transformed into a sanatorium for textile workers. As part of reform and opening up, the corporation sold the Garden to private real estate company Hainan Zhidi, serving as their Shanghai headquarters.

On 25 April 1989, Regan Garden was designated an outstanding historic building by the government, prompting the company to vacate the building. It was acquired by a consulting firm in 2002 and listed on the market for over CN¥1,200,000 in 2004.

== Architecture ==
Regan Garden is an English country-style two-storey house with an area of 960 square metres (10,300 sq ft). Its roof is made of red slate, while the exterior walls are painted white. Two balconies face south, where a small yard is located.
