= Liuzao, Shanghai =

Liuzao 六灶镇
- Town
- Location in Shanghai
- Coordinates: 31°06′58″N 121°41′55″E
- Country: People's Republic of China
- Municipality: Shanghai
- District: Pudong
- Elevation: 6 m (20 ft)
- Time zone: UTC+8 (China Standard)
- Postal code: 201322
- Area code: 0021

Liuzao (Chinese: 六灶; pinyin: Liùzào; Shanghainese: loh^{4}tsau^{3}) is a town in Pudong New Area, Shanghai, located about 8 kilometres (5.0 mi) west of Shanghai Pudong International Airport and more than 20 km (12 mi) southeast of Lujiazui. As of 2011, it has 2 residential communities (居委会) and 10 villages under its administration.

== See also ==
- List of township-level divisions of Shanghai
