= Shanghai New Hongqiao High School =

High school in Shanghai, China

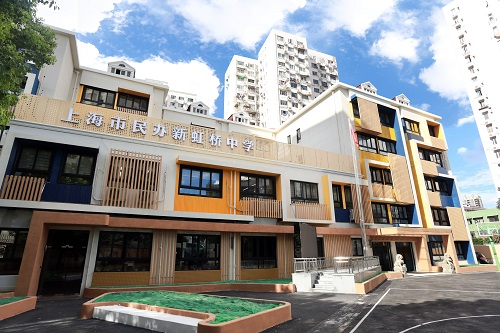
Shanghai New Hongqiao Secondary School

Shanghai New Hongqiao High School ("Shanghai New Hongqiao Secondary School", or the "School") (simplified Chinese: 上海市民办新虹桥中学; traditional Chinese: 上海市民辦新虹橋中學; pinyin: Shànghǎishì Mínbàn Xīn Hóngqiáo Zhōngxué "Shanghai Private New Hongqiao Secondary School") is a private secondary school in Changning District, Shanghai, China, serving grades 6 through 12. The school has two departments: Chinese and International. The International Department hosts programs from Noble Hills Academy (NHA) and Vancouver Public Education Alliance (VPEA), accredited in the United States of America and Canada, respectively.

== History ==
Shanghai New Hongqiao Secondary School is a public-to-private restructured complete secondary school established in 2000. The School is recognized as a National Outstanding Private School in China, and has been honored as a Shanghai Garden Unit.

The School's International Division was founded in 2001 and was among the first schools approved by the Shanghai Municipal Education Commission to directly recruit foreign students from overseas. In 2013, with the recommendation and support of the Changning District Education Bureau of Shanghai, the School signed the Sino-Canadian International High School Cooperative Education Agreement with several public school districts in British Columbia, Canada, which operates under the Ministry of Children and Family Development (British Columbia). After being reviewed and approved as a pilot project for high school international curriculum by the Shanghai Municipal Education Commission, the school launched its Sino-Canadian International Class.

Following several years of evaluation, in 2018, the School signed another cooperative education agreement with the New York Military Academy in the United States—the high school alma mater of the 45th and 47th president of the United States, Donald J. Trump —and established a Sino-American Curriculum Class.

Both programs adopt the North American high school education system, employ qualified foreign teachers, and offer tailored international curricula, preparing students for higher education abroad and admission to universities in North America.

== Online presence ==
While Shanghai New Hongqiao Secondary School operates an official website, current information regarding all the latest academic programs, admissions, and contact details is primarily disseminated through the school's WeChat Official Account (Chinese: 微信公众号), published in Chinese under the name 新虹桥中学 (English: New Hongqiao Secondary School).
