= Shihua Subdistrict, Shanghai =

Subdistrict in Jinshan District, Shanghai, China

Shihua (Chinese: 石化; pinyin: Shíhuà; Shanghainese: zah^{4}ho^{3} ka^{1}dau^{2}; literally "petrification") is a subdistrict and the seat of Jinshan District, in the southern extremity of Shanghai. As of 2011, it has 25 residential communities (社区) under its administration.

== See also ==
- List of township-level divisions of Shanghai
