= Chengjiaqiao, Shanghai =

Subdistrict of Changning, Shanghai

Chengjiaqiao 程家桥街道
- Subdistrict
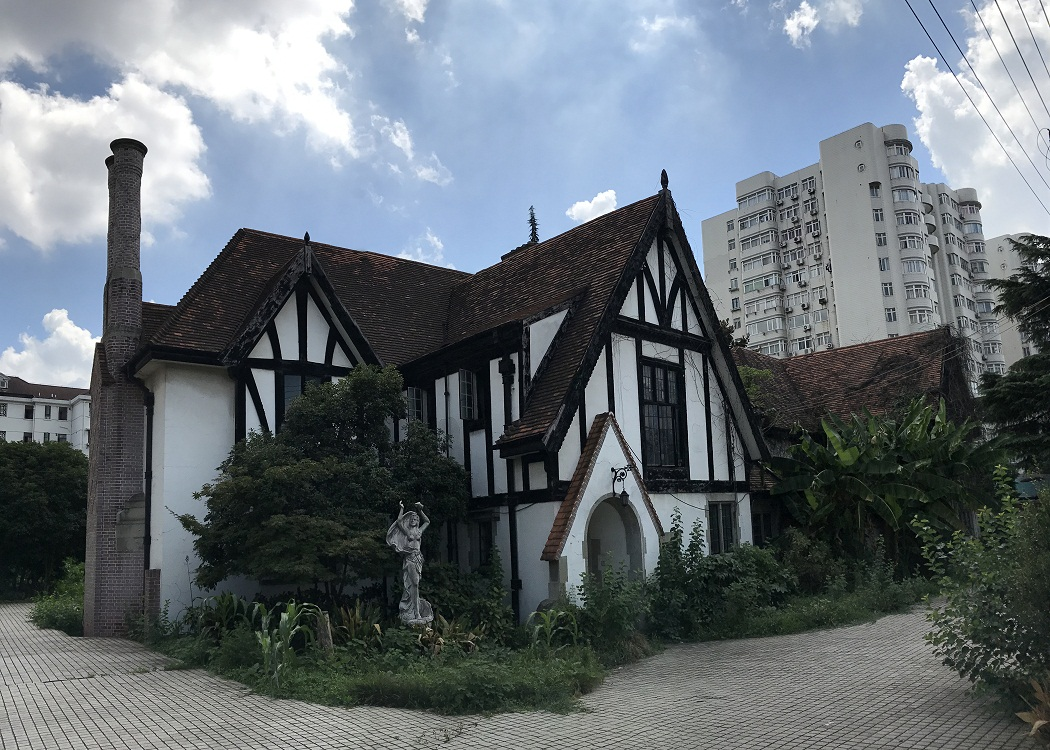
- Regan Garden
- Interactive map of Chengjiaqiao
- Country: China
- Municipality: Shanghai
- District: Changning District

Area
  - Total: 7.60 km^{2} (2.93 sq mi)

Population (2010)
  - Total: 24,487

Chengjiaqiao (simplified Chinese: 程家桥街道; traditional Chinese: 程家橋街道; pinyin: Chéngjiāqiáo Jiēdào) is a subdistrict of Changning, Shanghai.

== History ==
Settlements along the Xinjing River appeared in the early Qing dynasty. After the Boxer Rebellion, foreign powers built various amenities in the area, such as a golf course, gardens, mansions, and new roads.

After the Proclamation of the People's Republic of China, administrative boundaries were redrawn. The area went under Changning district and was named after bridge built across the Xinjing.

== Transportation ==
=== Metro ===
Line 10: Longxi Road station, Shanghai Zoo station, Hongqiao Airport Terminal 1 station

=== Aviation ===
Shanghai Hongqiao International Airport (Terminal 1)
