= Daqiao Subdistrict, Shanghai =

Daqiao Subdistrict 大桥街道
- Subdistrict
- Location in Shanghai
- Coordinates: 31°16′13″N 121°31′32″E
- Country: People's Republic of China
- Municipality: Shanghai
- District: Yangpu
- Village-level divisions: 29 residential communities
- Elevation: 11 m (36 ft)
- Time zone: UTC+8 (China Standard)
- Postal code: 200092
- Area code: 0021

Daqiao Subdistrict (simplified Chinese: 大桥街道; traditional Chinese: 大橋街道; pinyin: Dàqiáo Jiēdào; Shanghainese: du^{3}jiau^{1} ka^{1}dau^{2}) is a subdistrict of Yangpu District, Shanghai. As of 2018, it has 29 residential communities (居委会) under its administration.

== See also ==
- List of township-level divisions of Shanghai
