= Jiangsu Road Subdistrict, Shanghai =

Jiangsu Road Subdistrict 江苏路街道
- Subdistrict
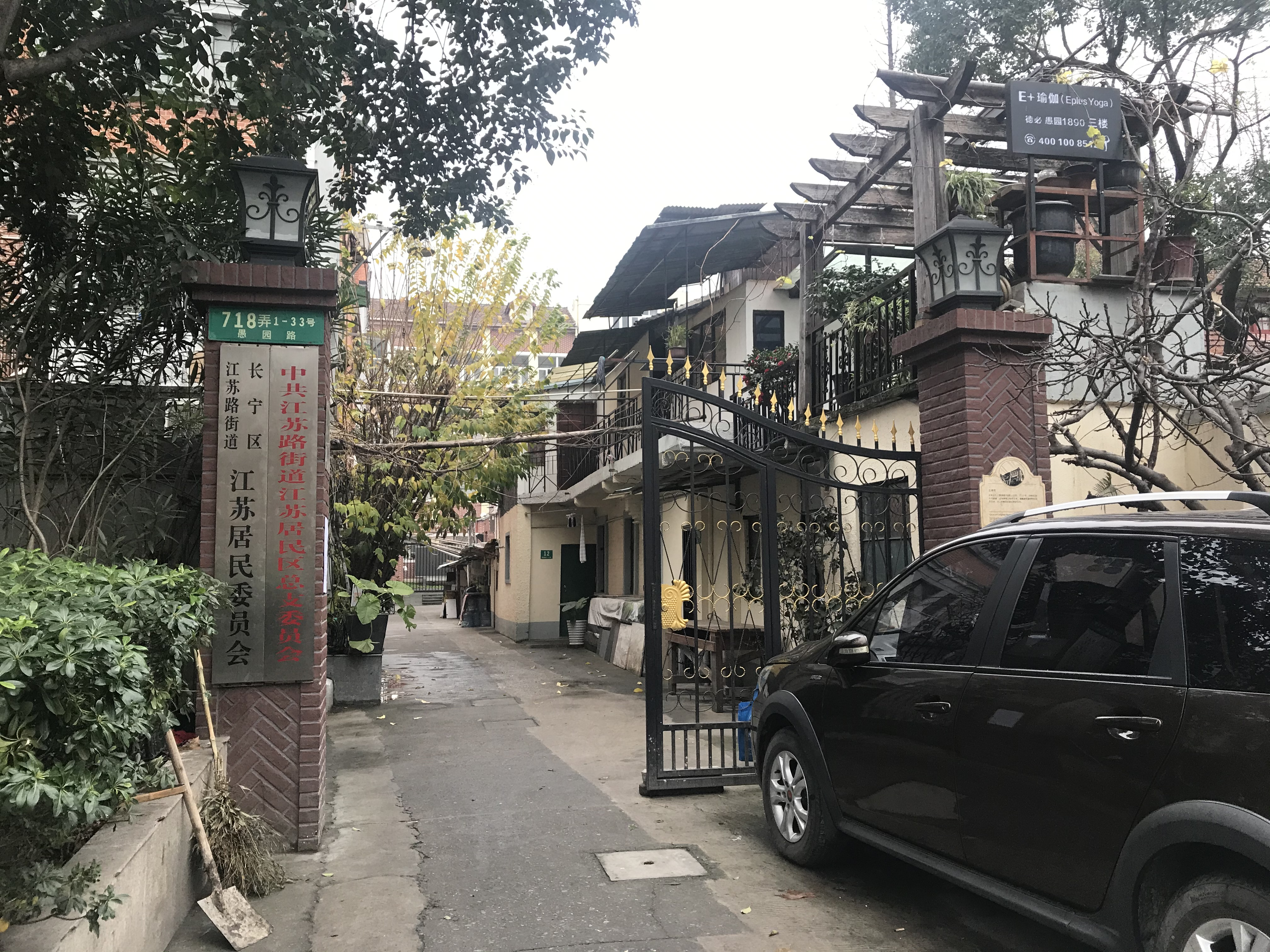
- The Jiangsu Community Committee Office
- Interactive map of Jiangsu Road Subdistrict
- Country: China
- Municipality: Shanghai
- District: Changning District

Area
  - Total: 1.52 km^{2} (0.59 sq mi)

Population (2010)
  - Total: 51,883
  - Density: 34,100/km^{2} (88,400/sq mi)

Jiangsu Road Subdistrict (simplified Chinese: 江苏路街道; traditional Chinese: 江蘇路街道; pinyin: Jiāngsū Lù Jiēdào) is a subdistrict in Changning District, Shanghai, China. It is one of the busiest subdistricts in Changning District and consists of the main governmental headquarters of Changning District. The subdistrict is located in the eastern portion of the district, spanning 1.52 square kilometres (0.59 mi^{2}) in area, and having a population of 51,883 as of the 2010 Chinese Census. It is home to Jiangsu Road Station.

== History ==
The subdistrict was founded in 1960, and named after Jiangsu Road, which passes through it.

By the end of 1992, the subdistrict comprised 22 residential communities, and was home to 68,096 people, living in 23,800 households.

By 1995, its population was about 72,500 people.

By 2004, the subdistrict was divided into 13 residential communities, as it is today.

== Administrative divisions ==
Jiangsu Road Subdistrict is divided into 13 residential communities. It residential communities are as follows:

- Qishan Community (Chinese: 岐山社区)
- Jiangsu Community (Chinese: 江苏社区)
- Wancun Community (Chinese: 万村社区)
- Nanwang Community (Chinese: 南汪社区)
- Dongbang Community (Chinese: 东浜社区)
- Yusan Community (Chinese: 愚三社区)
- Caojiayan Community (Chinese: 曹家堰社区)
- Xibang Community (Chinese: 西浜社区)
- Fushi Community (Chinese: 福世社区)
- Changxin Community (Chinese: 长新社区)
- Huashan Community (Chinese: 华山社区)
- Lixi Community (Chinese: 利西社区)
- Beiwang Community (Chinese: 北汪社区)
