= Xinjing, Shanghai =

Xinjing 新泾镇
- Town
- Location within Shanghai
- Coordinates: 31°12′51″N 121°22′5″E
- Country: People's Republic of China
- Municipality: Shanghai
- District: Changning

Area
  - Total: 35.40 km^{2} (13.67 sq mi)

Population (2010)
  - Total: 146,776
  - Density: 4,146/km^{2} (10,740/sq mi)
- Time zone: UTC+8 (China Standard)

Xinjing (Chinese: 新泾镇) is a town in the Changning District of Shanghai. As of 2018, it has 33 residential communities under its administration.
