= Yew Wah School of Shanghai =

Private school in Shanghai, China

== History ==
Yew Wah School of Shanghai is a private school located in the Changning District of Shanghai, China. Its Education Network started in 1932 when Madam Tsang Chor-hang opened the first school in Hong Kong.. Over the years, the network grew and spread beyond Hong Kong to many cities in Mainland China and other countries.

YCYW provides education for all age groups, starting from early childhood, going through primary and secondary school, and in some places offering college-level education. They describe this as covering from "baby to bachelor." Their goal is to provide a long-term education that is both bilingual and bicultural, blending Chinese and Western teaching styles to give students a balanced learning experience.

Yew Wah is a licensed Cambridge International Examinations center that offers both IGCSE and A Level courses to high school students. YCIS Shanghai, part of the Yew Chung Yew Wah Education Network, is fully accredited by the Council of International Schools (CIS) and the New England Association of Schools and Colleges (NEASC).

== Curriculum ==
The Secondary School is authorized to offer the International General Certificate of Secondary Education (IGCSE) and the International Baccalaureate Diploma Programme (IBDP), both recognized worldwide and preparing students well for higher education. Additionally, starting in the 2025–2026 academic year, the YCYW network plans to introduce the Hong Kong Diploma of Secondary Education (HKDSE) programme at its mainland China schools, including in Shanghai, broadening the range of qualifications available to students. Furthermore, starting in the 2025–2026 academic year, the YCYW network plans to introduce the Hong Kong Diploma of Secondary Education (HKDSE) programme at its mainland China schools, including in Shanghai, broadening the range of qualifications available to students.
