= Yang Liping =

Chinese dancer and choreographer

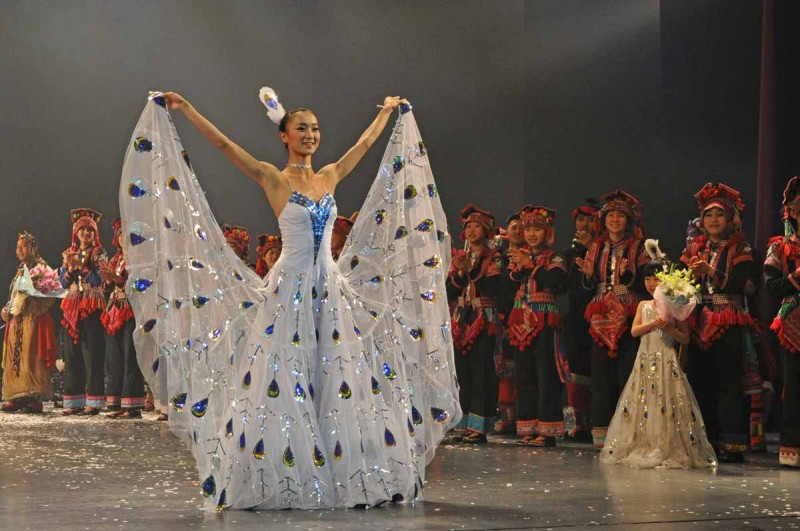
- Yang performing at a concert
- Born: November 10, 1958 (age 67); Wen Qiang village, Cibihu town, Dali, Yunnan province
- Education: Minzu University of China
- Occupations: Dancer; Choreographer
- Years active: 1971–present
- Title: Princess of Peacock, Dancing Goddess
- Spouse: Liu Chunqing (m. 1995)
- Relatives: Yang Cai Qi (Niece)

Chinese name
- Traditional Chinese: 楊麗萍
- Simplified Chinese: 杨丽萍
Transcriptions
Standard Mandarin
- Hanyu Pinyin: Yáng LìPíng

Yang Liping (Chinese: 杨丽萍; pinyin: Yáng LìPíng; born 10 November 1958) is a Chinese dancer and choreographer of Bai ethnicity. She rose to fame for choreographing and performing "The spirit of Peacock" in 1986. She was the first dancer from mainland China that went to Taiwan to perform in 1992. She is known across China for her creativity and her performance of the Dai peacock dance. Yang has been dubbed as the "Peacock Princess of China". She has performed over 1000 shows and toured to over 30 countries and regions, including The Philippines, Singapore, Russia, US, Canada, Taiwan, Japan and Australia.

== Early life and family ==
Yang was born 10 November 1958 in Wen Qiang village, Cibihu town, Dali city, Yunnan province. She is the eldest of four children. Her parents and grandparents, members of the Bai ethnic minority, were farmers in a nearby village. Her grandmother was a singer in the village. She was born during the Great Chinese Famine and lived a hard life. She moved to Xishuangbanna Dai Autonomous Prefecture with her family when she was nine. Fearful of persecution in Cultural Revolution, Yang's father left his family. 11-year-old Yang and her mother supported the whole family.

== Career ==
Yang began her formal dance training at the late age of 11 at a dance troupe in the Xishuangbanna area of Yunnan, after her family moved to the area. In the Southern flatland of Yunnan, Xishuangbanna borders the country of Burma and is dominated by the Dai ethnic group, whose Peacock dance she would become synonymous with. In 1971, she took on the role of "Peacock Princess" in the Xishuangbanna Song and Dance Troupe's narrative dance drama Zhaoshuzhun yu nanmunuona.

In her early 20s, after she moved to Beijing to dance with the Central Nationalities Song and Dance Ensemble, she made the Daomeilan's version of the peacock dance her own, recasting parts of it with deft arm and finger movements. In 1986, that choreography and dance won her first prize in a national competition. She rose to national level fame in 1986 when she won first prize in a national dance competition for her original solo "Spirit of the Peacock" (雀之灵). Ever since, she has been dubbed the "Peacock Princess".

She was the director, choreographer and star of "Dynamic Yunnan", a show that drew sellout crowds all over China. In 2004, "Dynamic Yunnan" won five major awards at the National Lotus Awards, including Gold Award for Dance Spectacular, Best Choreography and Best Female Performer. To create the exotic song and dance spectacular "Dynamic Yunnan", Yang spent years traveling to remote villages of the 26 ethnic minority tribes in Yunnan and selected over 60 villagers who had the natural gift of song and dance, from whom she built an archive re-creating this rich feast of sight and sound. It is part of a trilogy that she directed and choreographed between 2004 and 2008: "Dynamic Yunnan", "Echoes of Shangri-la" and "Tibetan Myth". She toured Europe and the United States in 2005.

In May 2009, she revealed a dance and music production 'Yunnan Sound', at the Yunnan Art Institute's Experimental Theater. On 17 November 2009, during US President Barack Obama's visit to China, she performed the classic dance "The Spirit of the Birds" at the Great Hall of the People. She is currently a judge on So You Think You Can Dance China.

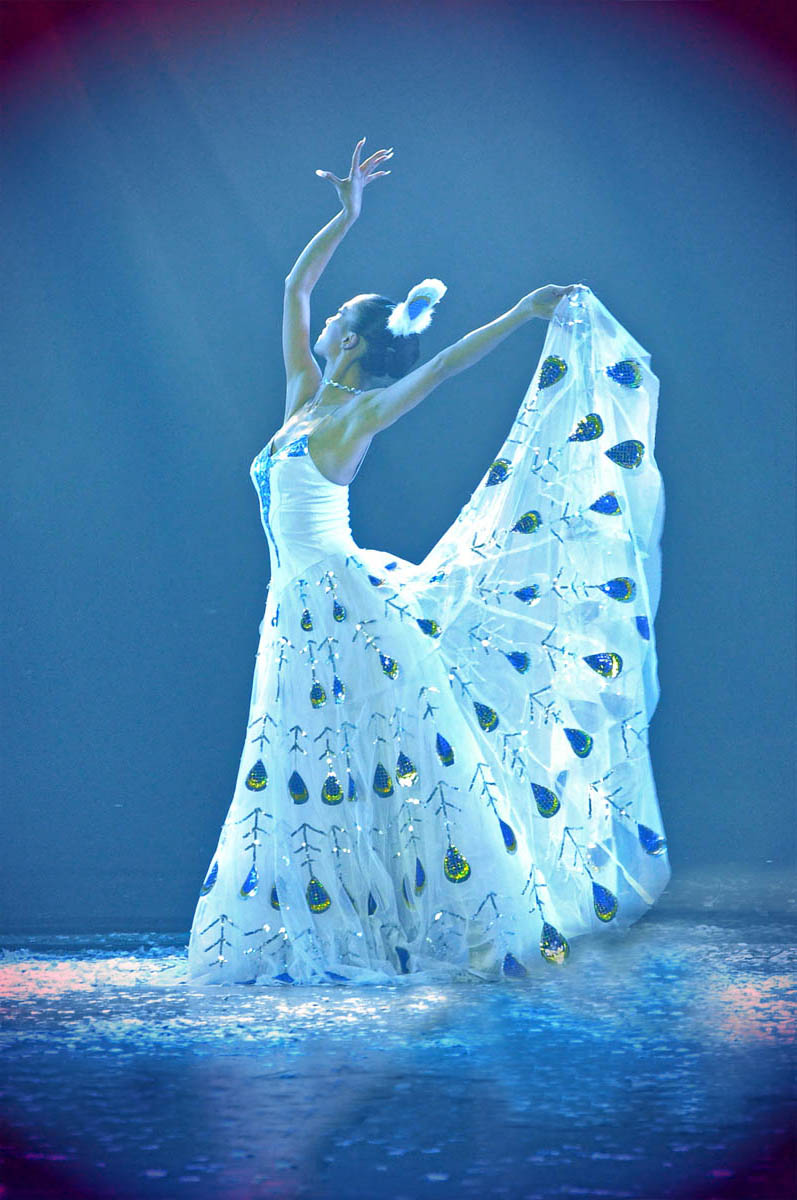
yang is performing in a concert dynamic Yunnan in China in 2010.

== Choreographic works ==
- Moonlight
- Pilgrimage to Lhasa
- Two trees
- 雨丝
- Fire
- Red temptation
- Daughter of the country
- Spirit of the Peacock
- Romantic peacock
- Echoes Of Shangrila
- Under Siege—The Full Story of Farewell My Concibine
- Dynamic Yunnan
- Peacock of Winter
- The Peacock
- Shangrila Dynamic Yunnan
- Dynamic Huangshan

== Personal life ==
Yang's first husband was a colleague of the Central National Song and Dance Troupe and later divorced. Her current husband, Liu Yuqing, is a Taiwanese-American. The couple met in 1990 and married in 1995, but Yang wants to dance long-term dieting and cannot be pregnant.
