= Datuan, Shanghai =

Datuan 大团镇
- Town
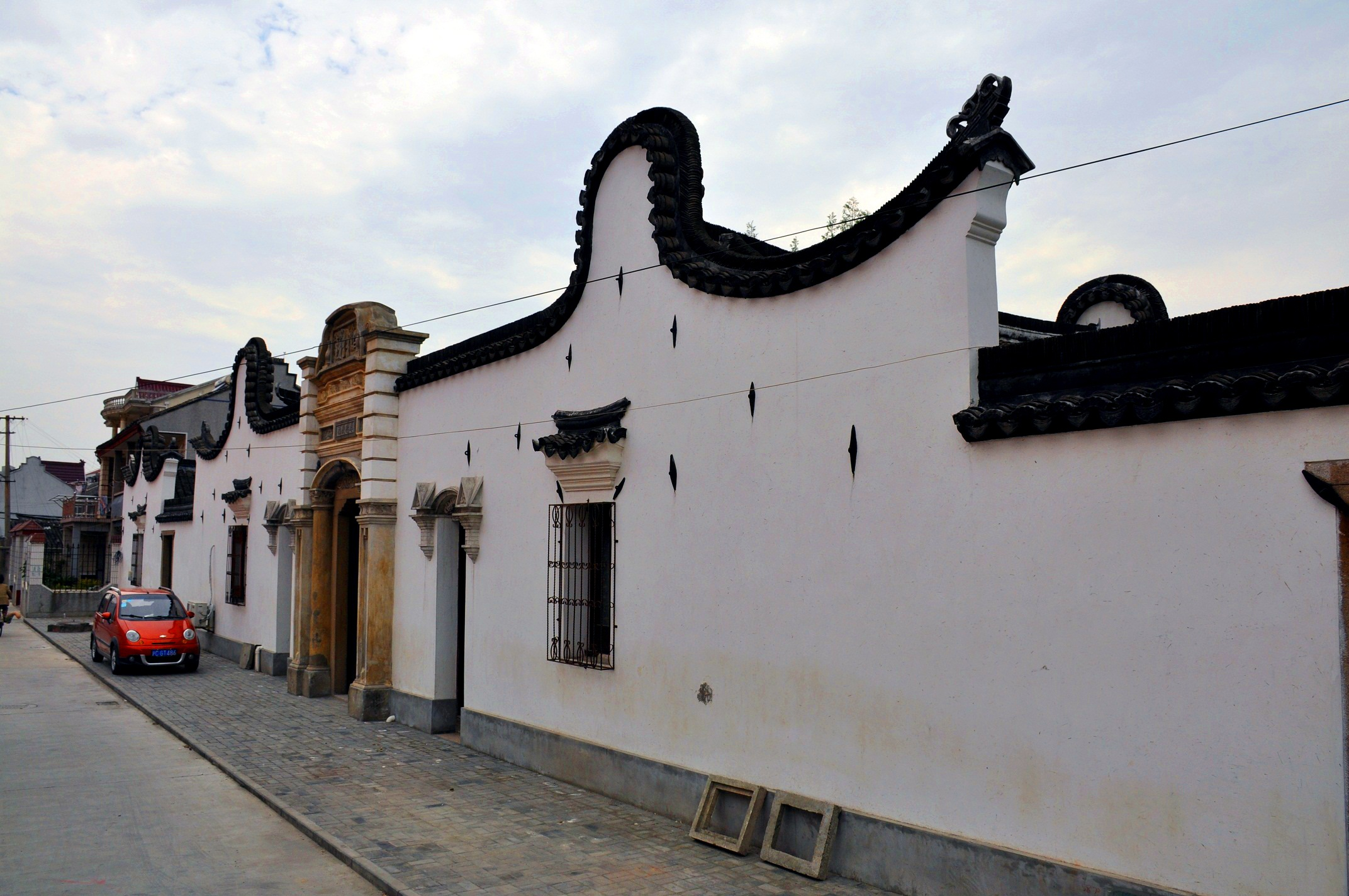
- Chezhan Village

- Location in Shanghai
- Coordinates: 30.9671°N 121.7374°E
- Country: People's Republic of China
- Direct-administered municipality: Shanghai
- District: Pudong
- Time zone: UTC+8 (China Standard)

Datuan (Chinese: 大团; pinyin: Dàtuán) is a town in Pudong New District, Shanghai, China. As of 2020, it administers the following five neighborhoods and 16 villages:

Neighborhoods

- Nanda (南大)
- Beida (北大)
- Sandun (三墩)
- Dongda Community (东大社区)
- Dongnan (东南)

Villages

- Zhennan Village (镇南村)
- Chezhan Village (车站村)
- Guoyuan Village (果园村)
- Jinshi Village (金石村)
- Zhaoqiao Village (赵桥村)
- Haichao Village (海潮村)
- Shaozhai Village (邵宅村)
- Tuanxi Village (团西村)
- Jinyuan Village (金园村)
- Jinqiao Village (金桥村)
- Yuanyi Village (园艺村)
- Longshu Village (龙树村)
- Zhoubu Village (周埠村)
- Fulan Village (扶栏村)
- Tuanxin Village (团新村)
- Shao Village (邵村)
