= Hangtou, Shanghai =

Hangtou 航头镇
- Town
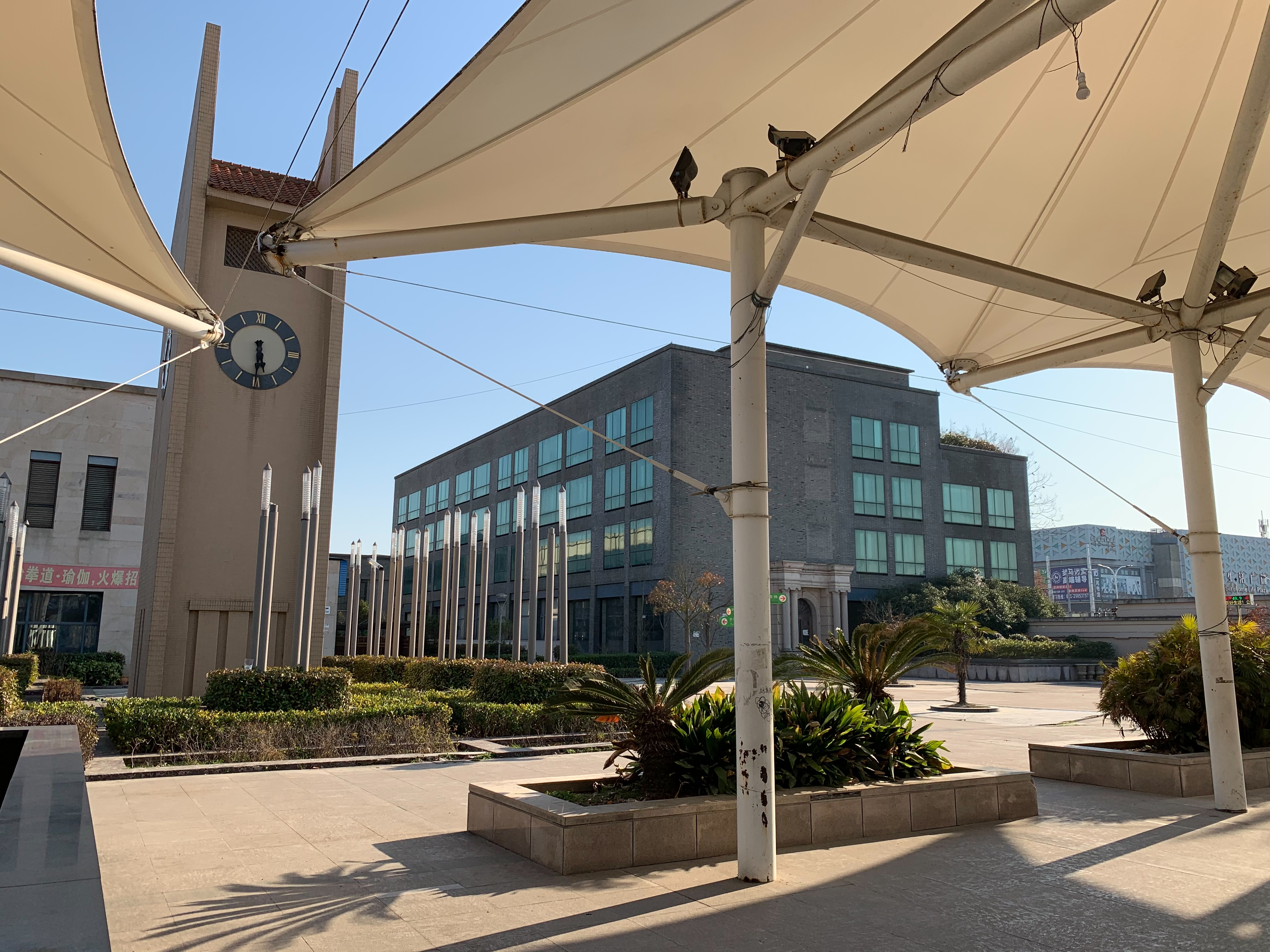
- Pedestrian street near the Hangtou station

- Location in Shanghai
- Coordinates: 31°2′2″N 121°35′13″E
- Country: People's Republic of China
- Direct-administered municipality: Shanghai
- District: Pudong
- Time zone: UTC+8 (China Standard)

Hangtou (Chinese: 航头; pinyin: Hángtóu) is a town in Pudong, Shanghai, China. As of 2020, it administers the following 28 residential neighborhoods and 13 villages:

Neighborhoods

- Hangtou
- Xiasha (下沙)
- Ruiheyuan (瑞和苑)
- Heming (鹤鸣)
- Changda (长达)
- Jinsehangcheng (金色航城)
- Dongshengjiayuan (东升家园)
- Haizhoutaohuayuan (海洲桃花园)
- Chenxiang (沉香)
- Nanxinjiayuan (南馨佳苑)
- Hengfujiayuan (恒福家园)
- Yulijiayuan (昱丽家园)
- Ruipujiayuan (瑞浦嘉苑)
- Hangwujiayuan (航武嘉园)
- Juhangyuan (聚航苑)
- Changtaidongjiao (长泰东郊)
- Huikangjinyuan (汇康锦苑)
- Yuxingjiayuan (昱星家园)
- Jinqinyuan First (金沁苑第一)
- Jinqinyuan Second (金沁苑第二)
- Dongmingyuan (东茗苑)
- Huichengjiayuan (汇诚佳苑)
- Hemeiyuan (和美苑)
- Huishanjiayuan (汇善嘉苑)
- Huirenxinyuan (汇仁馨苑)
- Ruixinyuan (瑞馨苑)
- Jindiyihuanian (金地艺华年)
- Ruixiangyuan (瑞祥苑)

Villages

- Haiqiao Village (海桥村)
- Heming Village (鹤鸣村)
- Changda Village (长达村)
- Guoyuan Village (果园村)
- Fushan Village (福善村)
- Chenxiang Village (沉香村)
- Hedong Village (鹤东村)
- Shenzhuang Village (沈庄村)
- Wanglou Village (王楼村)
- Meiyuan Village (梅园村)
- Pailou Village (牌楼村)
- Hangdong Village (航东村)
- Fengqiao Village (丰桥村)
