= Changning, Shanghai =

Changning 长宁区; 長寧區
- District
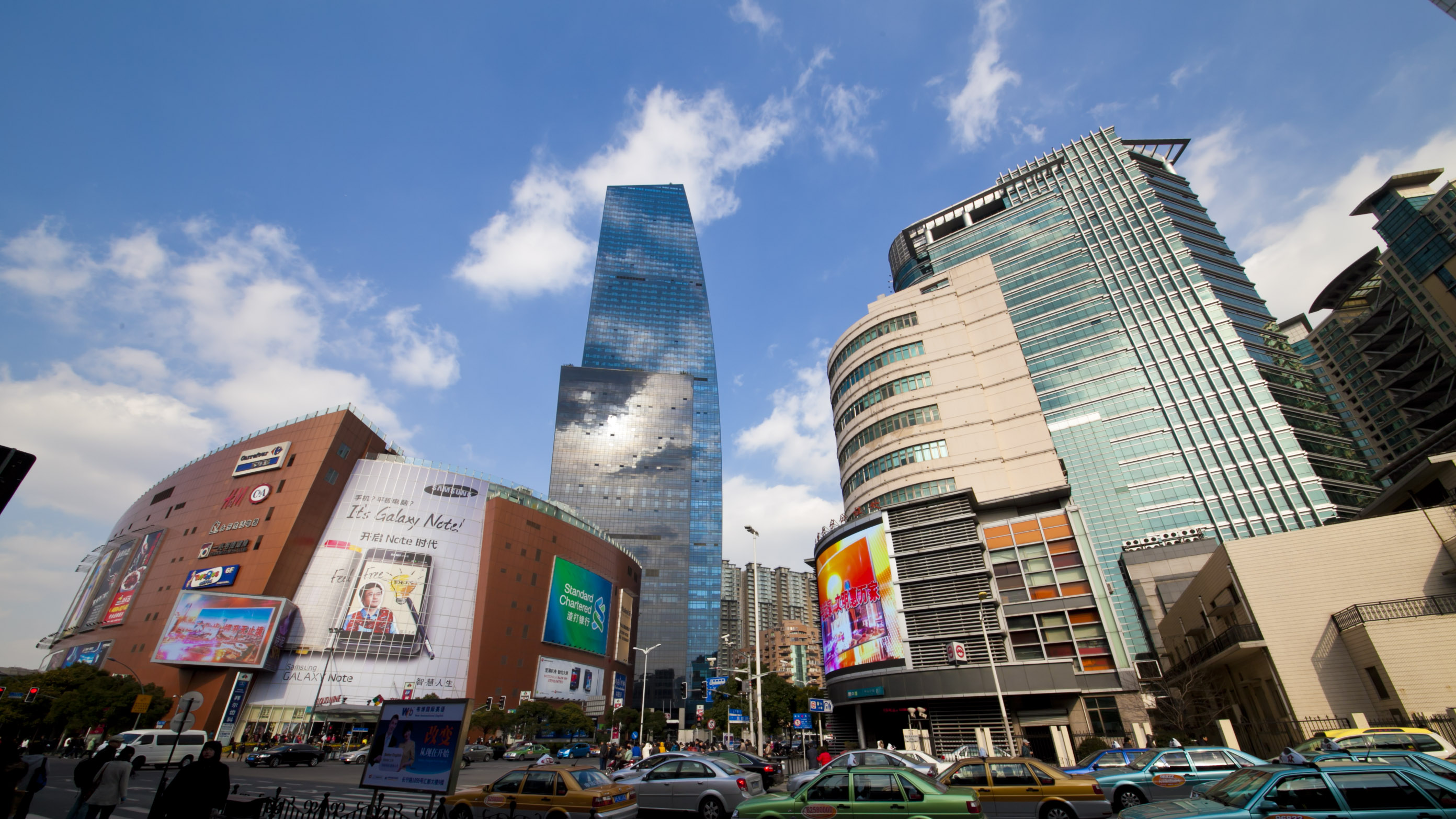
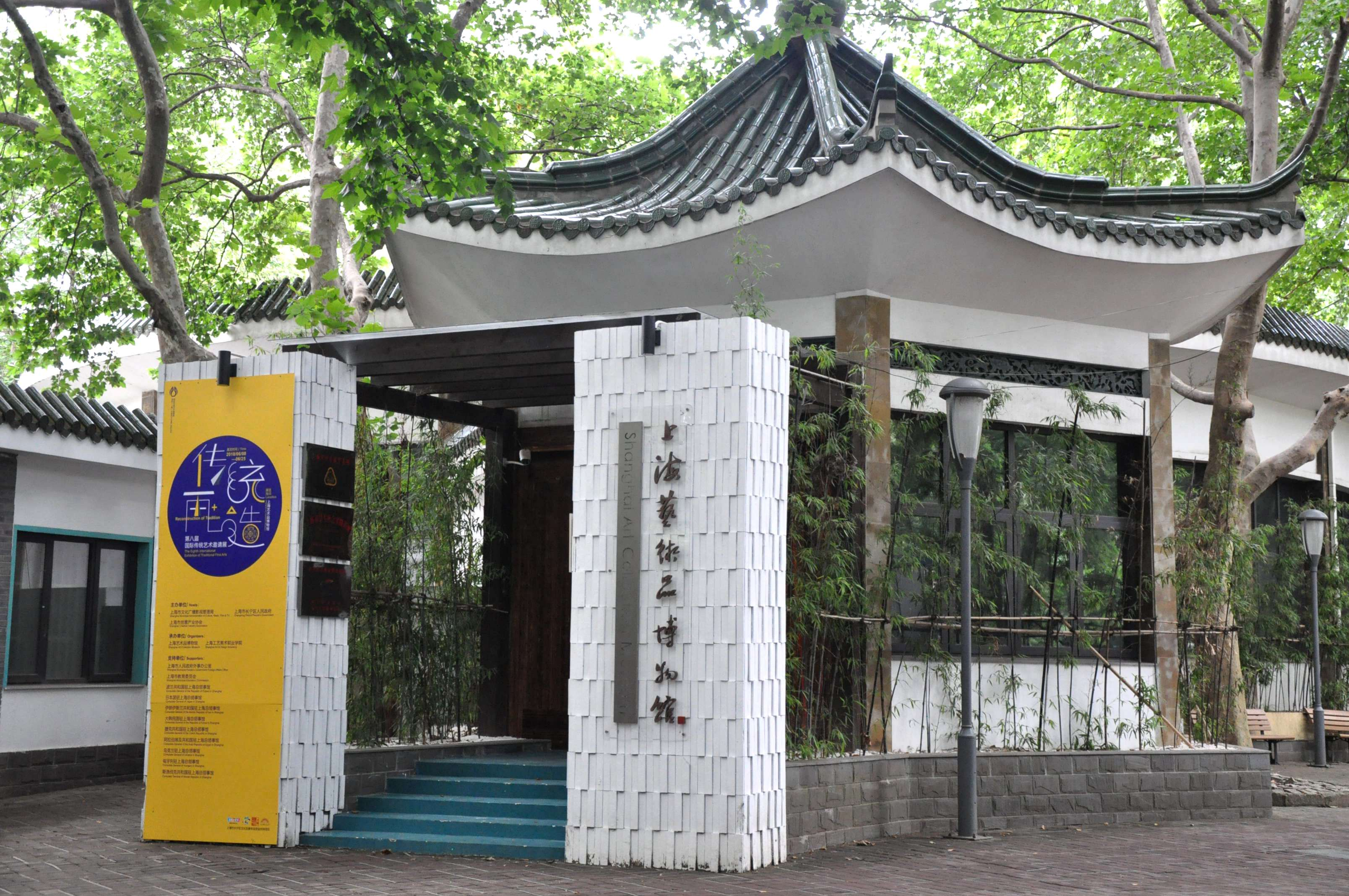
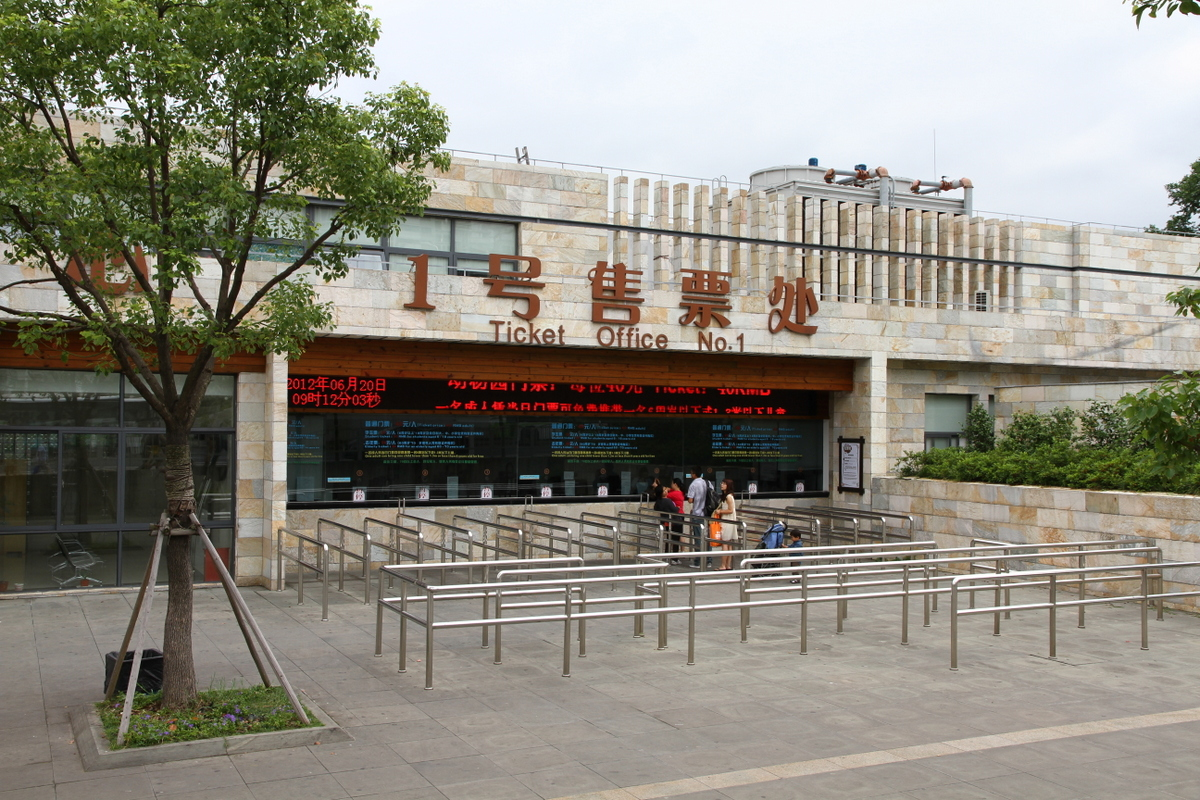
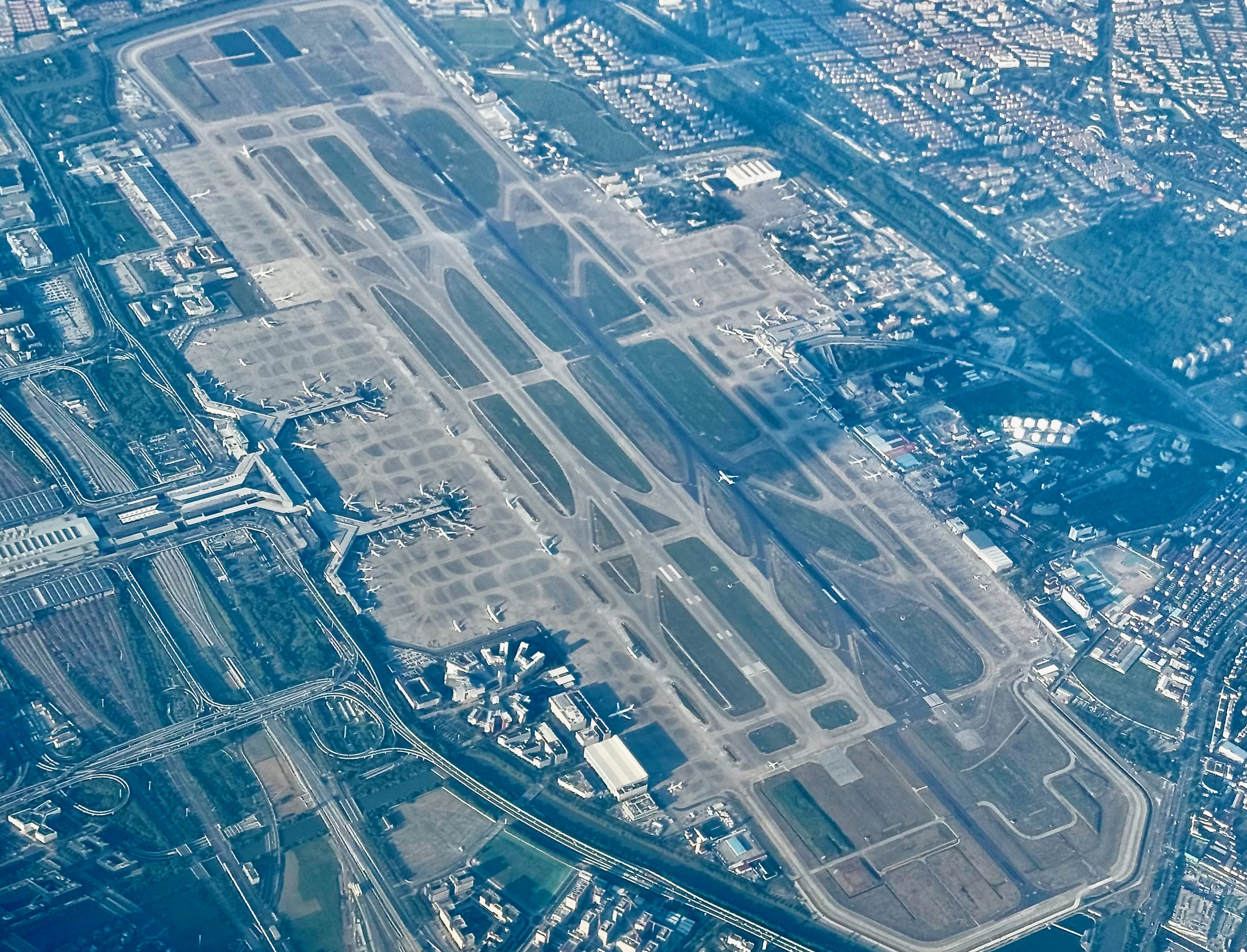
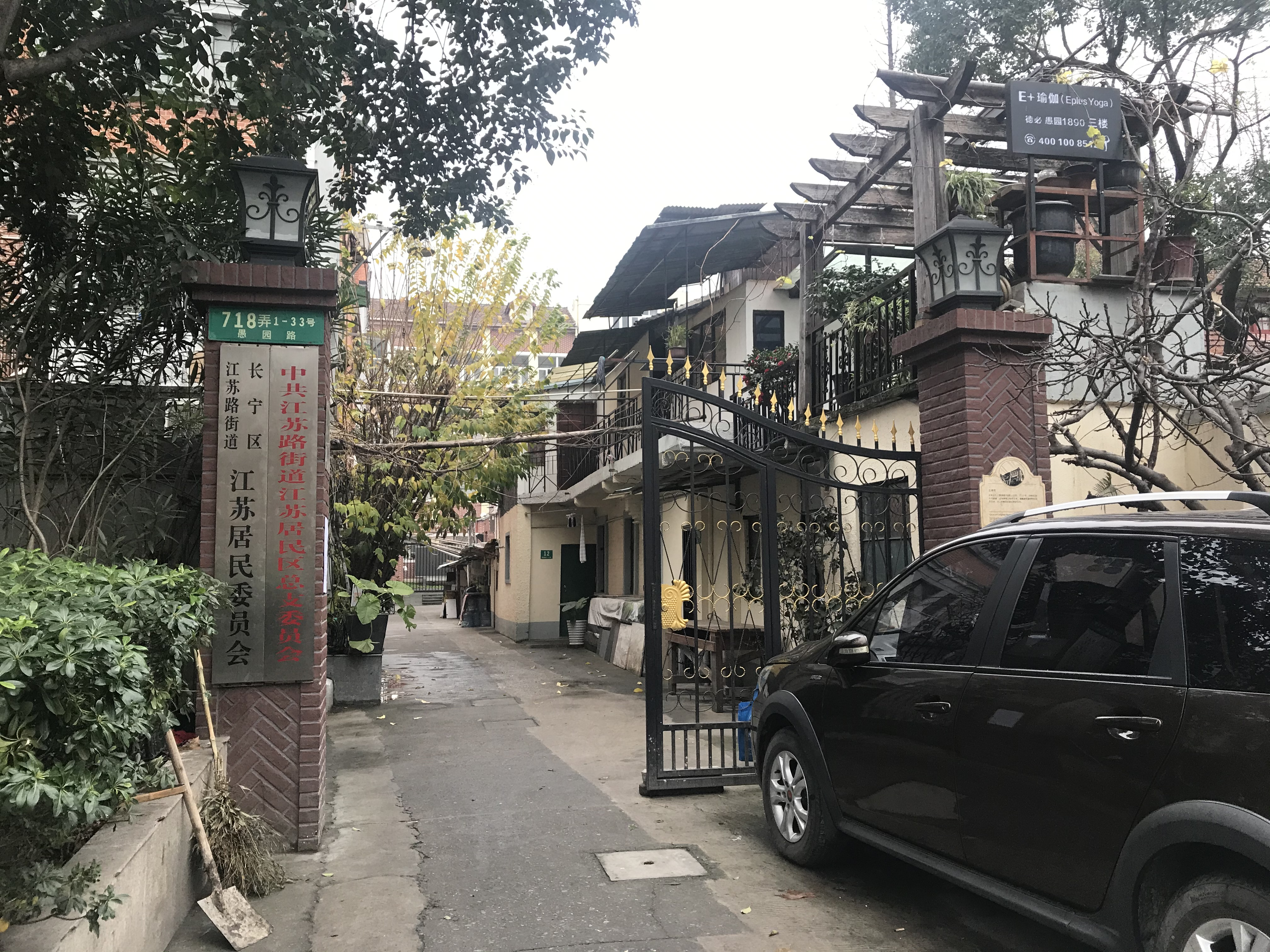
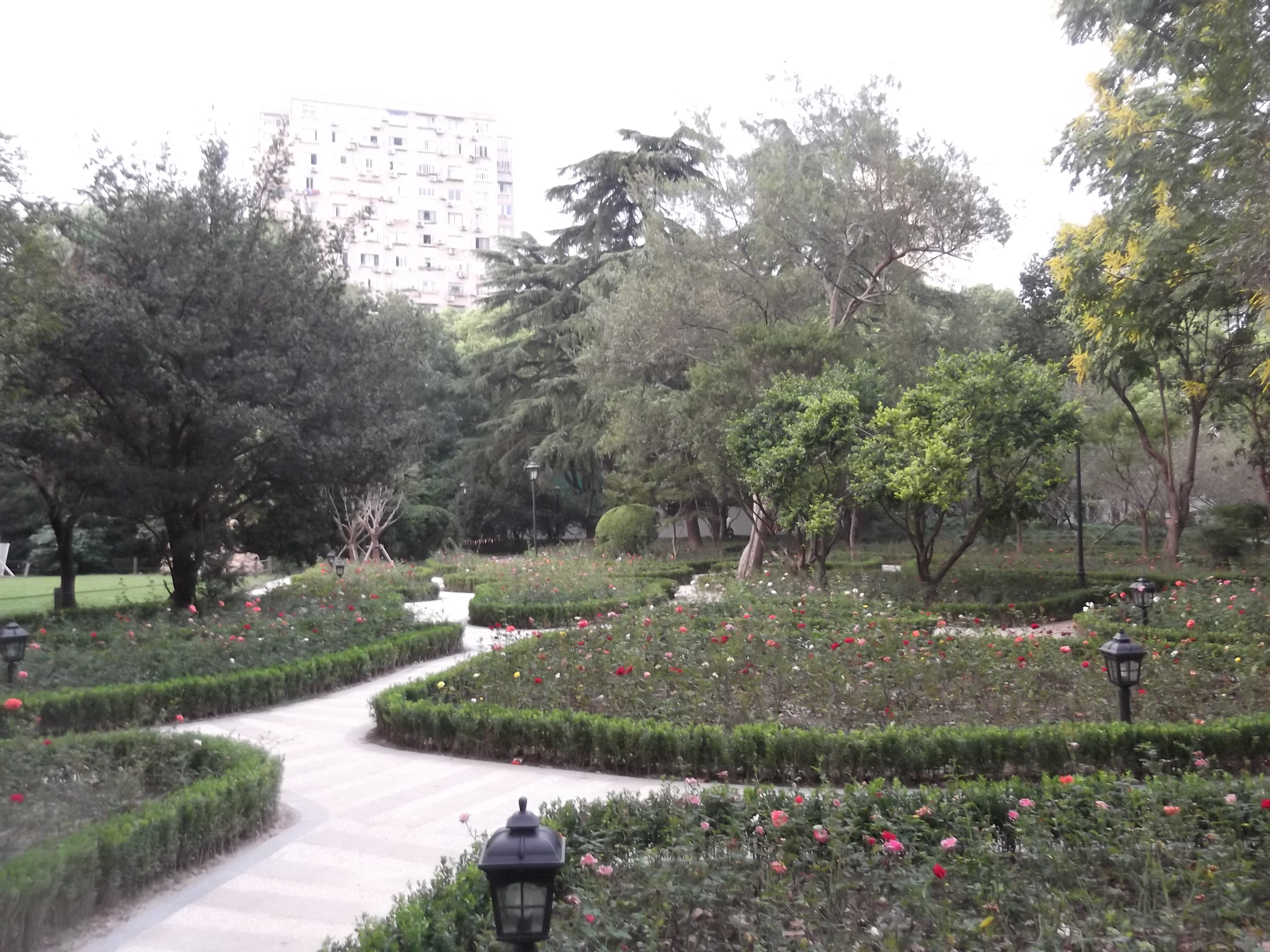
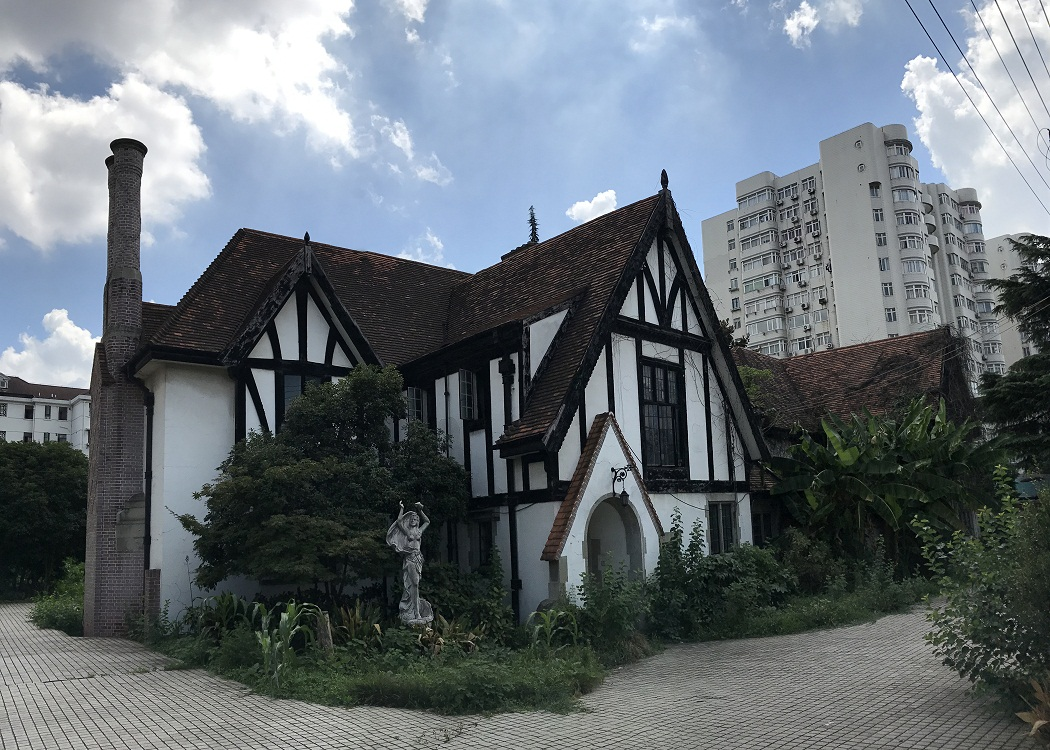
- Skyline of Longemont Shanghai Art Collection Museum Shanghai Zoological Park Hongqiao International Airport Jiangsu Road Zhongshan Park Regan Garden
- Interactive map of Changning
- Coordinates (Changning NPC Committee): 31°13′14″N 121°25′29″E
- Country: People's Republic of China
- Municipality: Shanghai

Area
  - Total: 37.19 km^{2} (14.36 sq mi)

Population (2018)
  - Total: 694,000
  - Density: 18,700/km^{2} (48,300/sq mi)
- Time zone: UTC+8 (China Standard)

Changning, Shanghai
- Traditional Chinese: 長寧區
- Simplified Chinese: 长宁区
- Wugniu: dzan^{2} gnin^{2} chiu^{1}
Transcriptions
Standard Mandarin
- Hanyu Pinyin: Chángníng Qū
Wu
- Wugniu: dzan^{2} gnin^{2} chiu^{1}
- IPA: Shanghainese: [zã˩ ȵin˦ tɕʰy˩]
Yue: Cantonese
- Jyutping: coeng^{4} ning^{4} keoi^{1}

Changning District (Chinese: 长宁区; pinyin: Chángníng Qū;) is one of the seven administrative districts that make up the city centre of Shanghai, China. It has a land area of 37.19 km^{2} (14.36 sq mi) and had a population of 694,000 as of 2018. The district government is located at 1320 Yuyuan Rd.

== Economy ==
Numerous airlines are headquartered in Changning, which houses Shanghai Hongqiao International Airport. China Eastern Airlines has its headquarters, the China Eastern Airlines Building, on the airport grounds. China Cargo Airlines has its headquarters on the airport property. Spring Airlines has its headquarters in the Homeyo Hotel in Changning. Juneyao Airlines formerly had its headquarters in the district.

Huazhu Hotels or China Lodging, which operates Hanting Hotels and other brands, has its headquarters in the district. Additionally Pinduoduo is based in the district.

Renren Inc. has its Shanghai office in the SOHO Zhong Shan Square (simplified Chinese: SOHO中山广场; traditional Chinese: SOHO中山廣場; pinyin: SOHO Zhōngshān Guǎngchǎng) in Changning District.

== Parks and recreation ==
Zhongshan Park and Kaiqiao Green Area are located in the district. The Shanghai Zoo is located in the district. New Town Central Park opened in 2000.

== Subdistricts and towns ==
| Name | Simplified Chinese | Pinyin | Shanghainese Romanization | Population (2010) | Area (km^{2}) |
|---|---|---|---|---|---|
| Huayang Road | 华阳路街道 | Huáyánglù Jiēdào | wu yan lu ka do | 72,730 | 2.04 |
| Jiangsu Road | 江苏路街道 | Jiāngsūlù Jiēdào | kaon su lu ka do | 51,883 | 1.52 |
| Xinhua Road | 新华路街道 | Xīnhuálù Jiēdào | sin rau lu ka do | 73,230 | 2.20 |
| Zhoujiaqiao | 周家桥街道 | Zhōujiāqiáo Jiēdào | tzoe ka djio ka do | 56,628 | 1.95 |
| Tianshan Road | 天山路街道 | Tiānshānlù Jiēdào | thi se lu ka do | 73,757 | 11.00 |
| Xianxia Xincun | 仙霞新村街道 | Xiānxiá Xīncūn Jiēdào | si ya sin tsen ka do | 84,664 | 3.97 |
| Hongqiao | 虹桥街道 | Hóngqiáo Jiēdào | ron djio ka do | 59,551 | 4.08 |
| Chengjiaqiao | 程家桥街道 | Chéngjiāqiáo Jiēdào | dzen ka djio ka do | 24,487 | 7.60 |
| Beixinjing | 北新泾街道 | Běixīnjīng Jiēdào | poq sin cin ka do | 46,865 | 2.13 |
| Xinjing | 新泾镇 | Xīnjīng Zhèn | sin cin tzen | 146,776 | 35.40 |

== Education ==
East China University of Political Science and Law has a Changning Campus.

Schools in Changning District include Shanghai Yan'an High School, a school well known for its mathematics program; Shanghai New Hongqiao High School, a private school; Yew Wah School of Shanghai; the Primary Division of the bilingual YK Pao School; Shanghai Meizhi Mandarin School, and Shanghai Shixi High School at 404 Yuyuan Road.

== Transportation ==
=== Metro ===
Changning is currently served by five metro lines operated by Shanghai Metro:

- Line 2 - Songhong Road, Beixinjing, Weining Road, Loushanguan Road, Zhongshan Park 3 4 , Jiangsu Road 11
- Line 3 and Line 4 - Hongqiao Road 10 , West Yan'an Road, Zhongshan Park 2
- Line 10 - Shanghai Zoo, Longxi Road, Shuicheng Road, Yili Road, Songyuan Road
- Line 11 - Jiaotong University 10 , Jiangsu Road 2
