= Battle of Shanghai =

1937 battle of the Second Sino-Japanese War

Coordinates: 31.2323°N 121.4690°E

- Part of the Second Sino-Japanese War and the interwar period
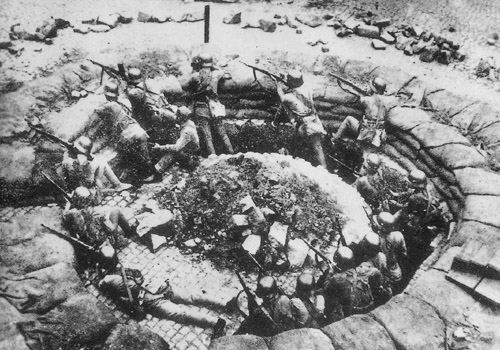
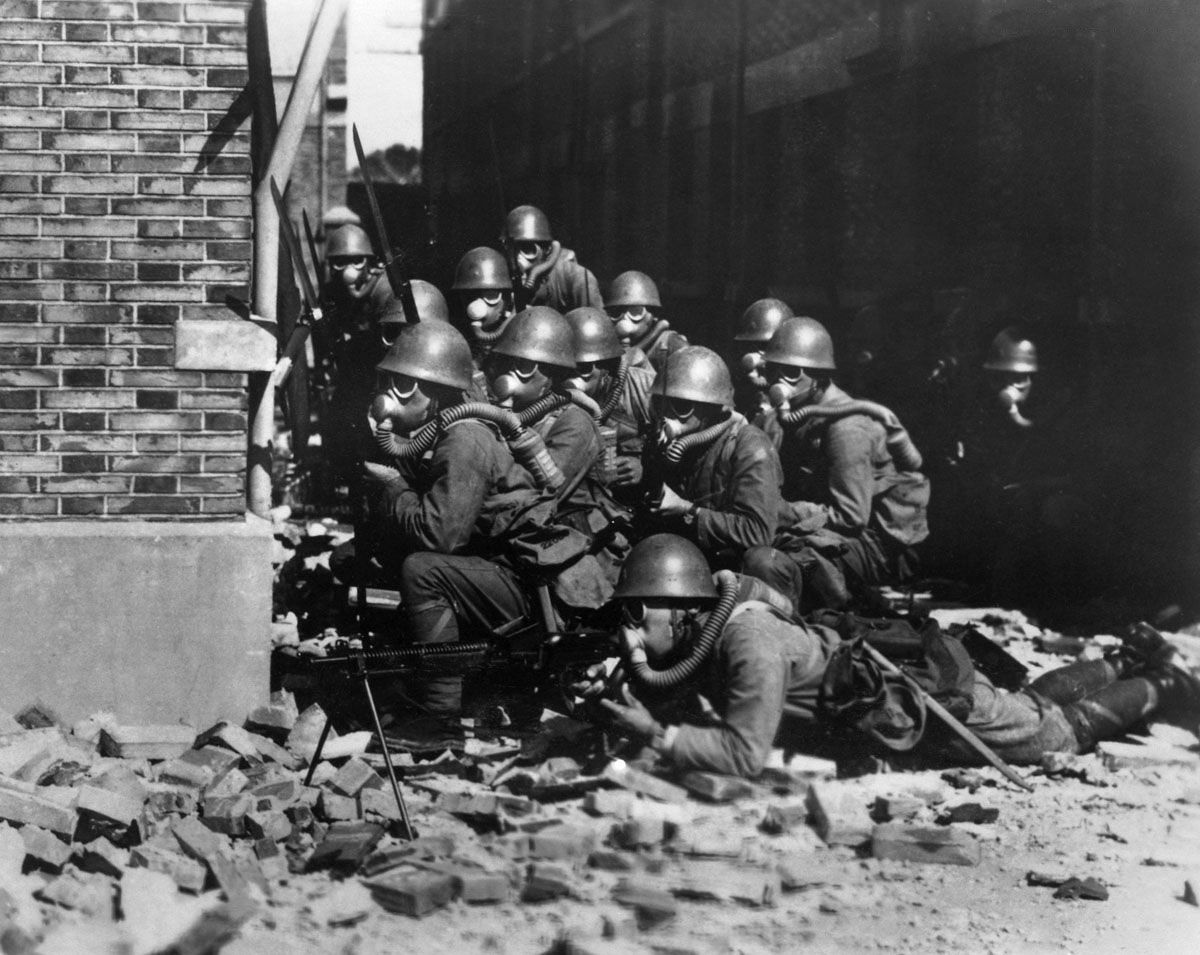
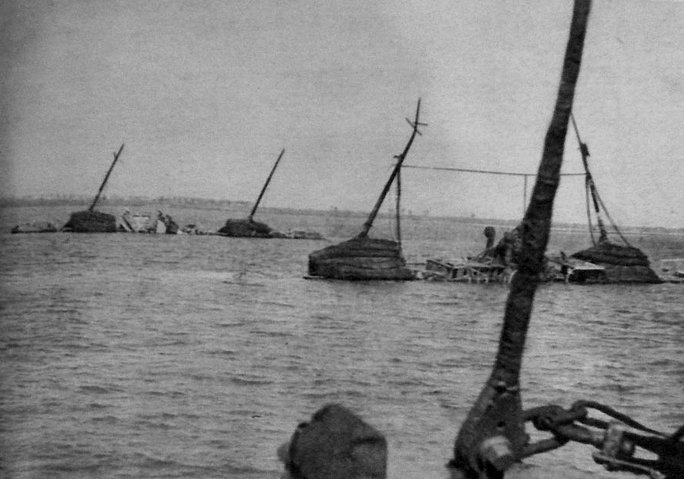
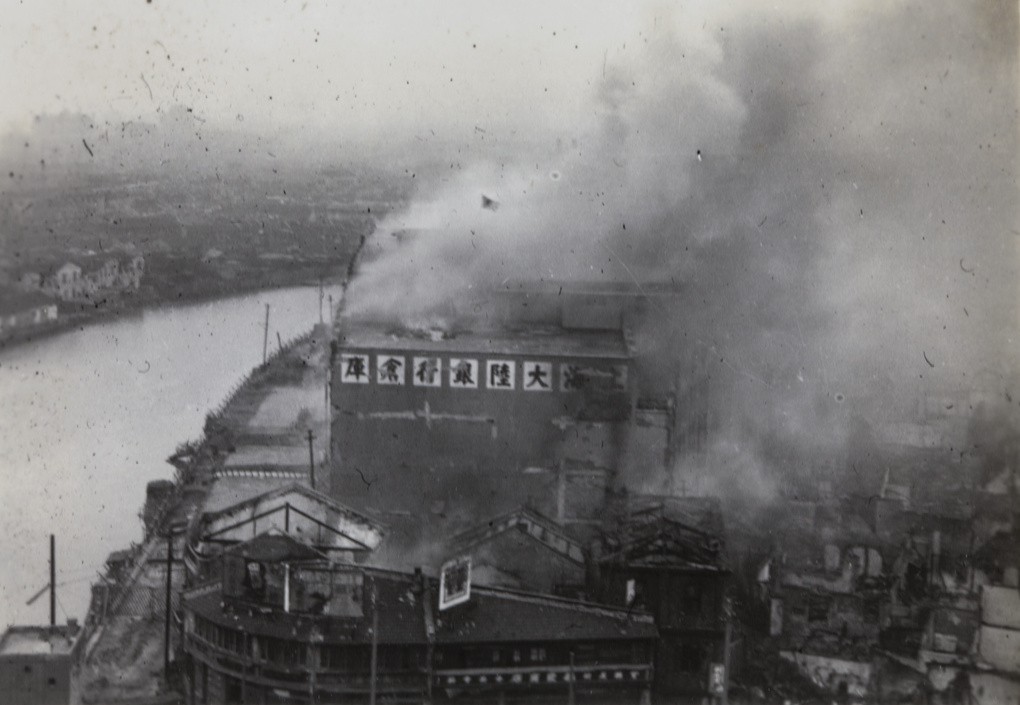
- Clockwise: Chinese army with ZB vz. 26 in fighting position; Troops of the Japanese SNLF in gas masks prepare for an advance in street; Sihang Warehouse in fire; Scuttled ships in the Yangtze near Jiangyin
| Date | August 13, 1937 – November 26, 1937 (3 months, 1 week and 6 days) |
| Location | Shanghai city in the Republic of China |
| Result | Japanese victory |
| Territorial changes | Japanese capture of Shanghai (excluding the Shanghai International Settlement and the Shanghai French Concession) |

Belligerents
| China | Japan |

Commanders and leaders
| (Republic of China (1912–1949)) Chiang Kai-shek; (Republic of China (1912–1949)) Chen Cheng; (Republic of China (1912–1949)) Zhang Zhizhong; (Republic of China (1912–1949)) Feng Yuxiang; (Republic of China (1912–1949)) Chen Shaokuan | (Empire of Japan) Heisuke Yanagawa; (Empire of Japan) Iwane Matsui; (Empire of Japan) Kiyoshi Hasegawa |

Units involved
| National Revolutionary Army; Republic of China Navy | Imperial Japanese Army; Imperial Japanese Navy |

Strength
| 700,000 troops; 70 divisions; 7 brigades; 180 aircraft; 70 tanks | 300,000 troops; 9 divisions; 1 brigade; 500 aircraft; 300 tanks; 130 naval ships |

Casualties and losses
| Chinese Report dated November 5, 1937, to the War Council: 187,200 killed and wounded Chinese Ministry of Military Affairs: estimated 300,000 casualties Japanese Estimates: By late October : 250,000 killed and wounded; By the end of October : 81,000 killed | Official Japanese war records: 47,000+ (42,202+ including at least 11,072 killed in action before November 8. After that, there is additional 4,785 casualties for the 9th division alone before December 1); this figure does not include the sick, the repatriated and those who died because of injuries 2017 Western Estimate: 18,800 combat killed (c. 17,000 plus about 1,800 illness-induced deaths), 35,000–40,000 wounded, and 40,000 sick, KIA figure seconded by General Iwane Matsui's Speech in 1938 |

The Battle of Shanghai (traditional Chinese: 淞滬會戰; simplified Chinese: 淞沪会战; pinyin: Sōng hù huìzhàn) was a major campaign fought between the Empire of Japan and the Republic of China in the Chinese city of Shanghai during the Second Sino-Japanese War. It lasted from August 13 to November 26, 1937, and was arguably the single largest and longest battle of the entire war, with it even regarded by some historians as the first battle of World War II. It resulted in the Japanese capture of Shanghai and heavy destruction to the city.

It was the first of the twenty-two major engagements fought between the National Revolutionary Army (NRA) of the Republic of China (ROC) and the Imperial Japanese Army (IJA) of the Empire of Japan at the beginning of the Second Sino-Japanese War. The Japanese eventually prevailed after over three months of extensive fighting on land, in the air and at sea. Both sides accused each other of using chemical weapons during the battle, with Japanese forces confirmed to have deployed poison gas at least thirteen times. Historian Peter Harmsen stated that the battle "presaged urban combat as it was to be waged not just during the Second World War, but throughout the remainder of the twentieth century" and that it "signalled the totality of modern urban warfare". It was the single largest urban battle prior to the Battle of Stalingrad, which occurred almost five years later.

Since the Japanese invasion of Manchuria in 1931 followed by the Japanese attack on Shanghai in 1932, there had been ongoing armed conflicts between China and Japan without an official declaration of war. These conflicts finally escalated in July 1937, when the Marco Polo Bridge Incident triggered a full-scale war between the two countries. Shanghai was China's largest and most cosmopolitan city, with it being the world's fifth largest city at the time. Shanghai was known as the "Pearl of the Orient" and "Paris of the East", with it being China's main commercial hub and largest port. By deliberately initiating a major conflict in Shanghai, it's believed that the Chinese leadership aimed to achieve several objectives: to divert the main Japanese focus to the Yangtze delta, thereby stalling the perceived north-to-south advance of the Japanese army, to give much needed time for the Chinese government to move vital industries to the interior, while at the same time attempting to bring sympathetic Western powers to China's side, though there is no consensus on whether this strategy was successful. During the fierce three-month battle, the forces of China and Japan fought in downtown Shanghai, in the outlying towns, and on the beaches of the Yangtze River and Hangzhou Bay, where the Japanese had made amphibious landings.

Chinese forces were equipped primarily with small-caliber weapons against much greater Japanese air, naval, and armor power. In the end, Shanghai fell, and China lost a significant portion of its best troops, the elite Chinese forces trained and equipped by the Germans, while failing to elicit any international intervention. However, the resistance of Chinese forces over three months of battle shocked the Japanese, who believed they could take Shanghai within days and China within months.

The battle can be divided into three stages, and eventually involved around one million troops. The first stage lasted from August 13 to August 22, 1937, during which the NRA besieged the Japanese Naval Landing Force stationed in Shanghai in bloody urban fighting in an attempt to dislodge them. The second stage lasted from August 23 to October 26, 1937, during which the Japanese launched reinforcing amphibious landings on the Jiangsu coast and the two armies fought a house-to-house battle in the creek country north of Shanghai, with the Japanese attempting to gain control of the city and the surrounding regions. The last stage, ranging from October 27 to the end of November 1937, involved the retreat of the Chinese army in the face of Japanese flanking maneuvers, and the ensuing combat on the road to China's capital at the time, Nanjing. In addition to the urban combat, trench warfare was also fought in the outskirts of the city.

Documentary film on Japanese Shanghai invasion. 淞滬會戰

== Prelude ==
=== Ōyama Incident ===
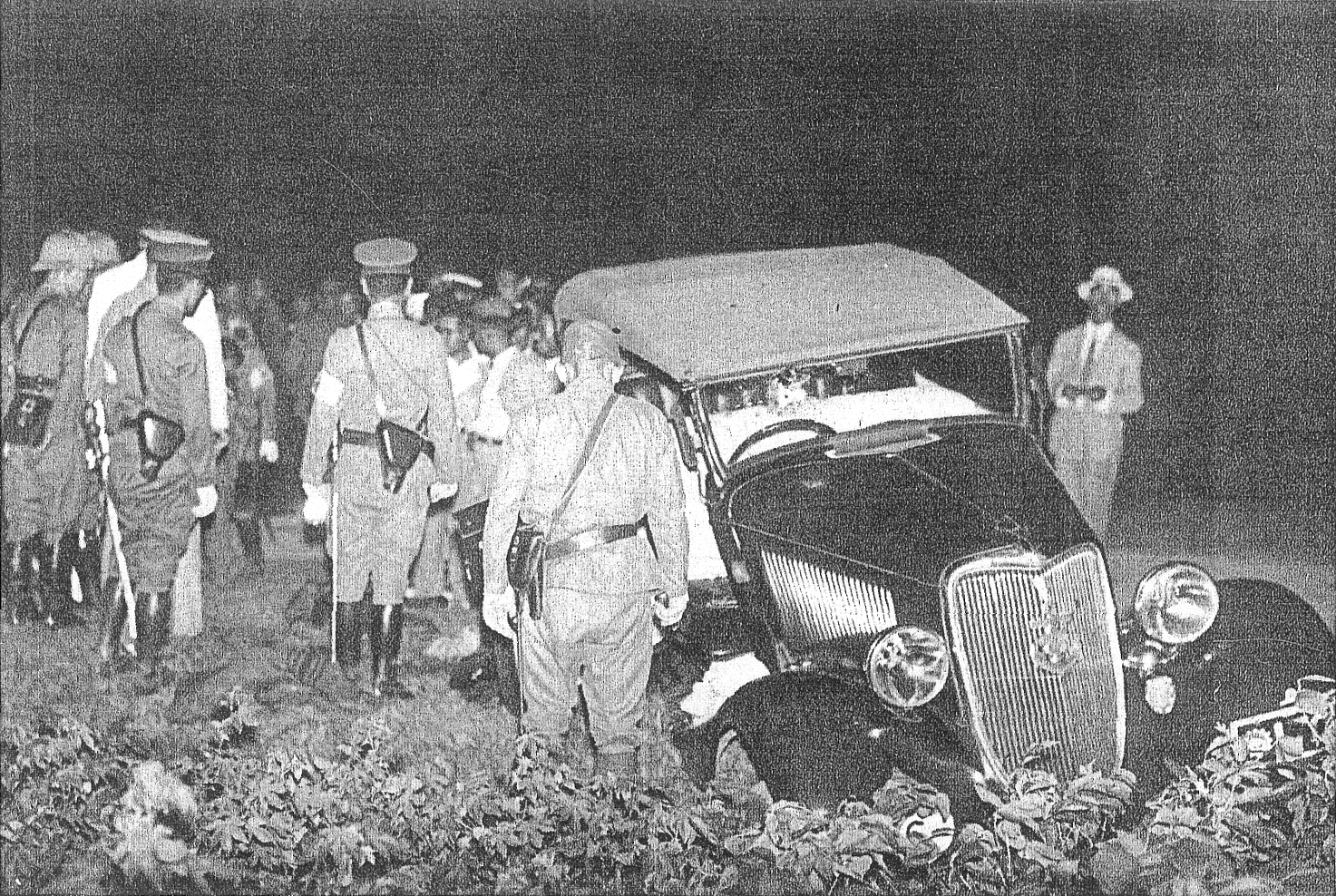
Ōyama Incident on August 9, 1937

On August 9, Naval Sub-Lieutenant Isao Ōyama (大山勇夫), head of the Western Detachment of the Japanese Special Naval Landing Forces stationed in Shanghai and his driver, First-Class Seaman Saito Yozo, along with a guard from the Chinese Peace Preservation Corps were found dead around the gate to Hongqiao Airport on Monument Road. Several accounts allege Ōyama and his driver were stopped by the Peace Preservation Corps Guard before Ōyama opened fire and killed them. The Sub-Lieutenant and his driver were then subsequently killed in returning fire from other guards at airport.

However, Ōyama was unarmed at the time of the shooting, having left his sidearm at the headquarters. Historian Peter Harmsen purported the so-called shootout to in fact be a staged scene to coverup the killing of the two Japanese naval personnel by Chinese soldiers masquerading as Peace Preservation Corps.

Shi Shuo, the head of the Operations Section of the headquarters of the 9th Group Army during the battle of Shanghai, believed that the Japanese had known that the Chinese had sent in soldiers disguised as Peace Preservation troops into Shanghai to circumvent the January 28 armistice agreement forbidding the Chinese Army to station soldiers inside the city. On August 9, Chinese soldiers disguised as Peace Preservation troops at the gate of Hongqiao Airport shot and killed a Japanese officer for reportedly disobeying orders and attempting to get in. The Chinese Shanghai Garrison Command panicked upon hearing the news and had a death row inmate dressed in Peace Preservation Corps uniform and killed at the airport gate to make it seem like Ōyama had killed a guard first.

It is still unknown whether Ōyama attempted to enter the military airport under higher orders. The incident heightened the tensions between the Chinese and Japanese forces in Shanghai. On August 10, 1937, the Japanese Consul General demanded that the Chinese withdraw the Peace Preservation Corps and dismantle their defense works around the city. He also made it clear that the Imperial Japanese Army regarded the shooting of a Japanese officer as humiliating, and that any further incident would escalate the situation. In response to the incident, the Japanese began sending in reinforcements to Shanghai. Facing the increasing Japanese military presence in Shanghai, Chinese troops were also being deployed to the Shanghai area beginning on August 11.

=== Final efforts at negotiation ===
On August 1, 1937, representatives from the United Kingdom, France, United States and Italy along with Japan and China participated in the joint conference held in Shanghai to discuss the ceasefire terms. Japan demanded the withdrawal of Chinese troops from Shanghai, while the Chinese representative Yu Hung-chun dismissed the Japanese demand, stating that the terms of ceasefire have already been violated by Japan. The major powers did not wish to see another January 28 Incident, which greatly disrupted foreign economic activities in Shanghai. On the other hand, Chinese citizens feverishly welcomed the presence of Chinese troops in the city. In Nanjing, Chinese and Japanese representatives met for the last time for final efforts at negotiation. The Japanese demanded that the Chinese withdraw all Peace Preservation Corps from Shanghai and all regular troops from the vicinities of the city. The Chinese insisted that the Japanese demand of a unilateral Chinese withdrawal was unacceptable since the two countries were already fighting a war in North China. At last Mayor Yu made it clear that at most the Chinese government would concede that the Chinese troops would not fire unless fired upon. Japan on the other hand placed all responsibility on China because of Chinese deployment of troops around Shanghai. Negotiation was impossible and there was no alternative other than the spread of war into Central China.

== First phase (August 13–22) ==
=== Opening shots ===
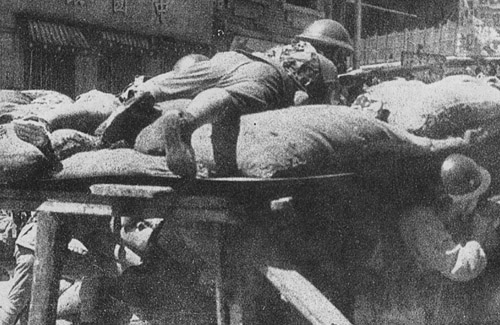
Chinese troops of the Peace Preservation Corps manning fortifications in Shanghai

Around 9 am on August 13, the Chinese Peace Preservation Corps exchanged small arms fire with Japanese troops in the Zhabei, Wusong, and Jiangwan districts of Shanghai. At about 3 pm the Japanese army crossed over the Bazi Bridge (八字橋) in Zhabei and attacked various centers in the city. The 88th Division retaliated with mortar attacks. Sporadic shooting continued through the day until 4 pm, when Japanese headquarters ordered ships of the Third Fleet stationed in the Yangtze and the Huangpu River to open fire on Chinese positions in the city. Late that night, Chiang Kai-shek ordered Zhang Zhizhong to begin Chinese offensive operations the next day. The next morning the Republic of China Air Force (ROCAF) began bombing various Japanese targets and Chinese ground forces attacked at 3 pm. On the same day, August 14, 1937, the Chinese government issued the Proclamation of Self-Defense and War of Resistance (自衛抗戰聲明書), explaining the government's resolution against Japanese aggression. The Battle of Shanghai had officially begun.

Chiang's initial plan was to have the numerically superior Chinese forces attack the Japanese by surprise and push them into the Huangpu River using Entscheidungsschlacht tactics recommended by his German advisor Alexander von Falkenhausen. His troops were then to blockade the coast to deny the Japanese the opportunity to land reinforcements at the Huangpu wharves between Yangshupu and Hongkou,. The 88th Division was to attack Japanese army headquarters near Zhabei, and the 87th Division was to attack the reinforced Kung-ta Textile Mill, where the Japanese naval command was located.

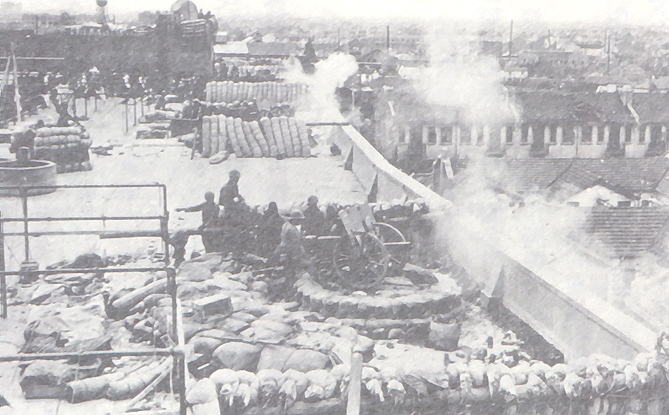
Japanese artillery positions atop a roof.

The Japanese strongholds in the Hongkou salient were heavily fortified with thick concrete, barbed wire, sandbags, and machine guns. Their bunkers and were also resistant to 150mm howitzers, the only heavy weapons the Chinese possessed. Zhang estimated it would take one week to achieve these objectives; however, the operation ran into trouble when his troops were fought to a standstill just outside the Shanghai International Settlement.

=== First attacks ===
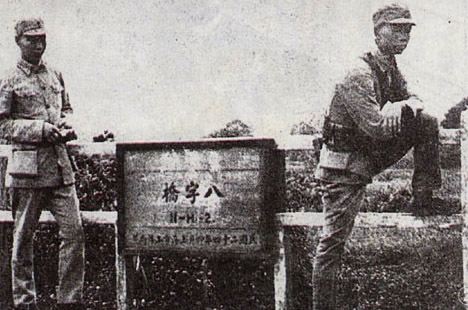
Chinese troops on the Bazi Bridge, where fierce fighting occurred in the early days of the battle.

On the late afternoon of August 14, 1937, the Chinese 88th Division attacked Japanese positions in downtown Shanghai, but was halted by direct fire from the entrenched Japanese and heavy bombardments from the Japanese Third Fleet moored in the Huangpu. Chinese artillery was also positioned too far in the rear, with inexperienced crews and poor communication from their observers preventing effective Chinese artillery support in the fighting. Chinese troops could only advance, under the cover of machine gun fire, by getting close enough to the emplacements to kill those within with hand grenades. The Chinese advance was greatly slowed and the element of surprise was lost.

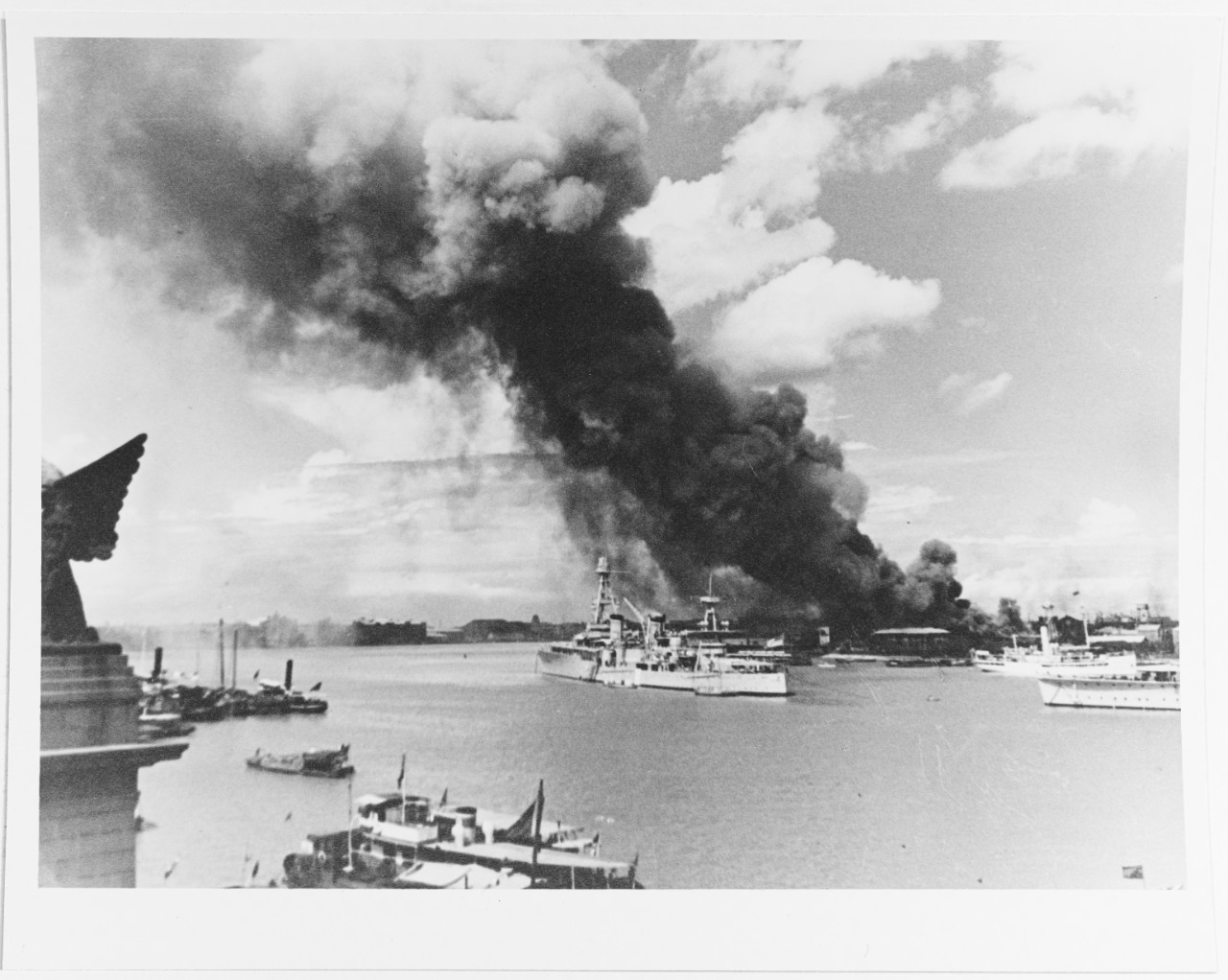
Heavy smoke rises from Pudong, as seen from The Bund. August 14, 1937.

As a result, the Chinese suffered heavy losses in the first attack, with over a thousand casualties including brigade commander Huang Meixing who was killed when an artillery shell destroyed his position near the Bazi Bridge. By nightfall, Chiang ordered Zhang Zhizhong to pause the assault.

=== Operation Iron Fist ===
On August 15, 1937, Chiang convened with his divisional staff to organize a second assault on the Japanese defenses, this time with greater firepower and preparation. The Chinese divisions were to use German Stosstrupp shock tactics, advancing immediately after an intense artillery barrage to break through Japanese lines and fight their way deep behind enemy positions before the defenders could recover.

Since their forces lacked adequate heavy weapons to destroy the Japanese bunkers directly, the Chinese command decided to use encirclement tactics. To this end, Zhang Zhizhong instructed his troops to take the streets surrounding the Japanese strongholds, avoiding costly frontal attacks on heavily fortified positions.

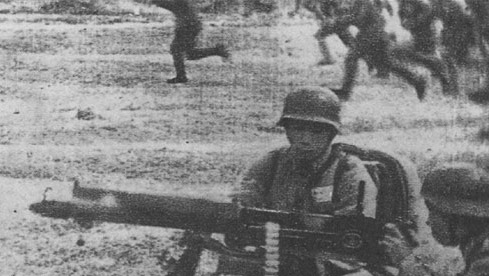
Chinese troops mount a charge past a machine gun crew.

In the morning of the 17th, the 88th and 87th Divisions launched Iron Fist, first intensely shelling the Japanese positions and then charging with infantry. In line with Zhang's tactics, every time a street was successfully cleared, the Chinese would construct sandbag blockades and gradually surround each Japanese stronghold, closing off all possible routes of escape. The tactic was successful at first and the Chinese were able to destroy several emplacements and outposts on the first day.

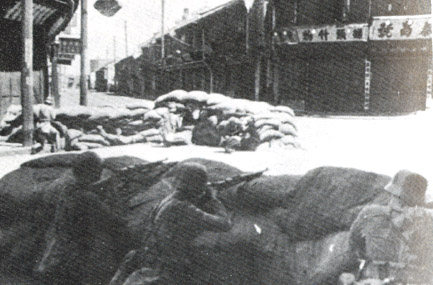
Troops of the elite 88th Division guarding an intersection in downtown Shanghai

In spite of the fierce fighting and heavy casualties, the Chinese were unable to make a major breakthrough because of ineffective coordination between infantry and artillery, poor reconnaissance, and the relentless shelling from Japanese ships on the Huangpu River. The Chinese were further hampered by their reluctance to fight inside the International Settlement so as to not alienate international opinion, which prevented potential flanking maneuvers against weaker points in the Japanese line. At the Bazi Bridge, the Chinese 88th Division suffered high casualties in a seesaw battle against Japanese armor units, which had flanked their positions from multiple directions.

By August 18, 1937, the Chinese attack had been called off. Iron Fist had proved a costly affair for the Chinese, who had endured heavy casualties in the vicious urban fighting.

=== Urban fighting ===
On August 18, 1937, another 1,400 Japanese marines were shipped in to Shanghai from Manchuria, bolstering the ranks of the Japanese Shanghai SNLF. On the same day, Chinese General Chen Cheng reached the front lines to discuss the situation with Zhang Zhizhong. Due to the attrition sustained by the forces present, the Chinese commanders decided to send the newly arrived German-trained 36th Division into the attack. Half the division was ordered to attack towards the Hueishan (匯山) docks on the northern side of the Huangpu River, which would cut the Japanese forces in two. The plan entailed fighting through five heavily defended intersections; heavy casualties were expected.

On August 19, two regiments of the 36th Division began their assault towards the wharf, enduring withering fire from Japanese defenders positioned on the roofs and upper floors of the buildings lining the streets. The Chinese were also subject to fierce bombardments from the Japanese Third Fleet anchored in the Huangpu.

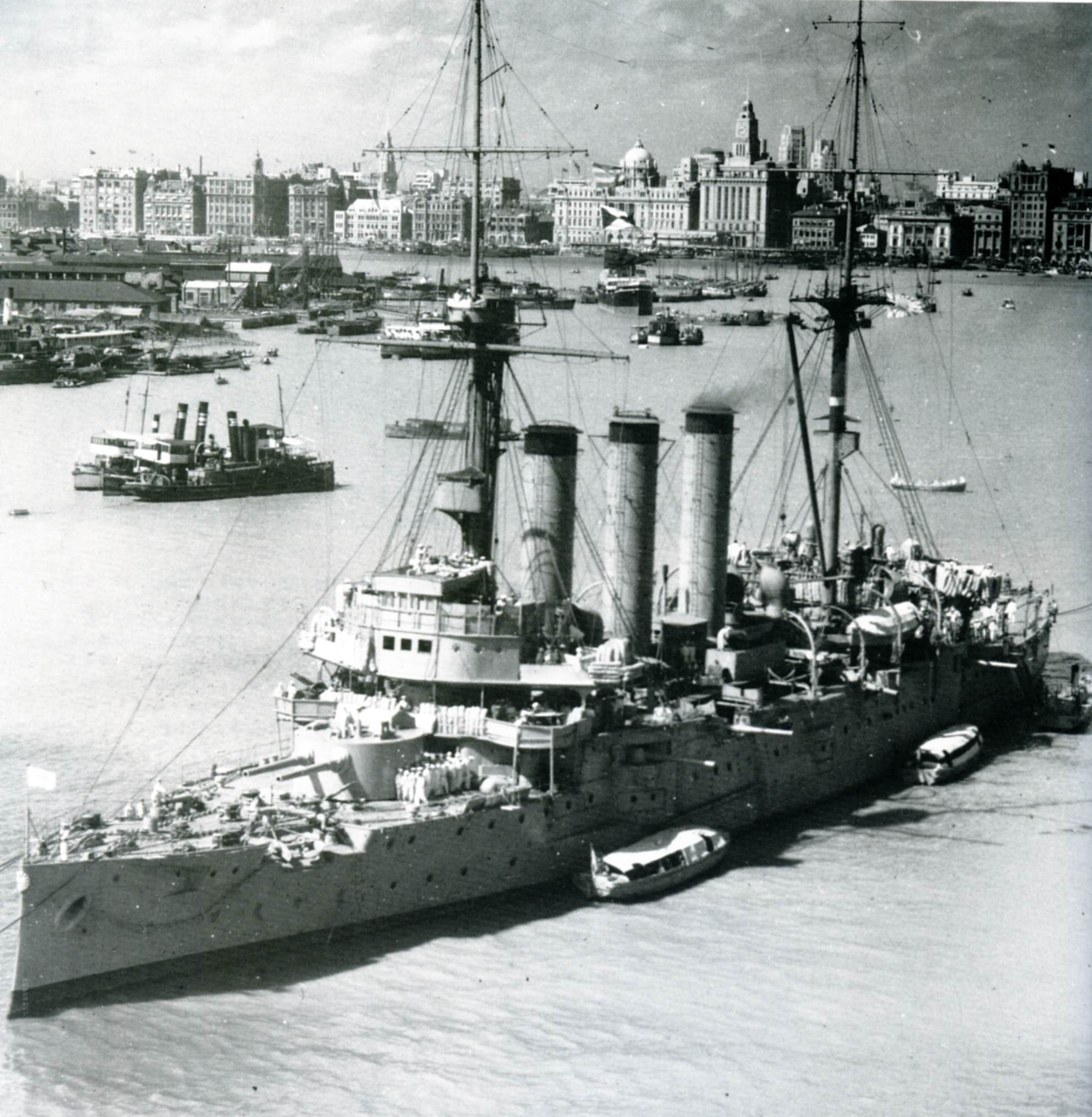
The Japanese flagship Izumo moored in the Huangpu, before the Bund.

At this point, the Chinese decided to deploy British-made Vickers 6-ton tanks to assist their troops in the assault. However, the Chinese were insufficiently trained in coordinating infantry-tank tactics, and the troops were unable to keep up with the tanks. Without sufficient infantry to protect them, the tanks were vulnerable to Japanese anti-tank weapons and artillery in the close quarters, and became useless when they entered the city center.

At the intersection of Zhoushan Road and Kunming Road, the Japanese SNLFs utilized fortifications and high-rise buildings to resist the attacking 212th Regiment. Chinese soldiers had to use the bodies of the dead as cover to advance. The commander of the assault battalion was wounded, and brigade commander Chen Ruihe (陳瑞河) went to lead from the front until he too was seriously injured. The 2nd Battalion of the 215th Regiment was sent in the reinforce the 212th Regiment. Battalion commander Li Zeng (李增) was killed immediately, while 300 soldiers from the battalion rushed into an alleyway to infiltrate the Japanese defenses through the buildings. In response, the SNLF blocked the entrance of the alleyway with two tanks and set the surrounding buildings on fire, killing all 300 men in the inferno. The Japanese also lost tanks to Chinese anti-tank weapons within the battle's urban confines. 36th Division staff officer Xiong Xinmin saw a Chinese suicide bomber stop a Japanese tank column by strapping grenades to himself, diving beneath the lead tank and detonating the vest.

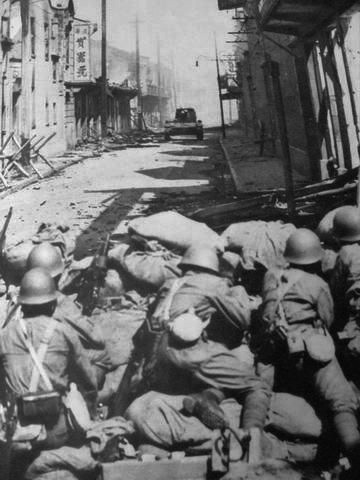
Japanese SNLF fighting against a Chinese Vickers tank. August 22, 1937.

Despite the heavy resistance and at the cost of heavy casualties, the Chinese were able to push the Japanese back. At the same time, the 87th Division had broken through Japanese lines at Yangshupu, and pushed the Japanese back to the Hueishan docks along with the 36th Division. By August 21, 1937, Chinese tanks had managed to punch through to Broadway, the last street before the Huangpu.

However, the Chinese were unable to finish their breakthrough, as the Japanese had taken position atop the high walls lining the wharf, through which the only entrance was a steel gate impervious to the heaviest Chinese artillery pieces. Chinese soldiers attempting to scale the gate were gunned down by enfilading machine gun fire. The Japanese had also fortified several factories along the riverline, such as the Gong Da Cotton Mill that could withstand Chinese artillery.

While the Chinese had almost succeeded in pushing the Japanese into the Huangpu River, the casualty rate was exceedingly high. During the night of August 22 alone, the 36th Division lost more than ninety officers and a thousand troops. By the end of the offensive, the 36th Division had suffered more than 2,000 casualties, many of which were sustained by the relentless shelling from Japanese naval guns. According to battle reports from the 78th Army, the 36th Division had suffered 1,344 killed, wounded, or missing from August 19 until August 23, 1937, in the fighting around Yangshupu. On August 19, 1937, another wave of reinforcements from Sasebo brought the SNLF garrison's numbers to 6,300

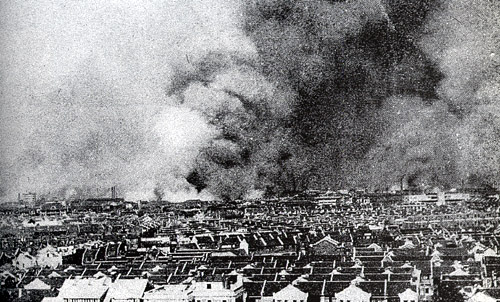
Zhabei on fire

American correspondent Edgar Snow described the scenes of the battle while observing from the international zone, "It was as though Verdun had happened on the Seine, in full view of a Right Bank Paris that was neutral; as though a Gettysburg were fought in Harlem, while the rest of Manhattan remained a non-belligerent observer." An eyewitness at the battle stated that it was "no longer a war between armies, but between races. With mounting fury the two giants, like two men who have started a boxing match and who suddenly find themselves convulsed with hate, sprang at each other's throat in a tussle in which the only prize was death."

=== Air operations ===
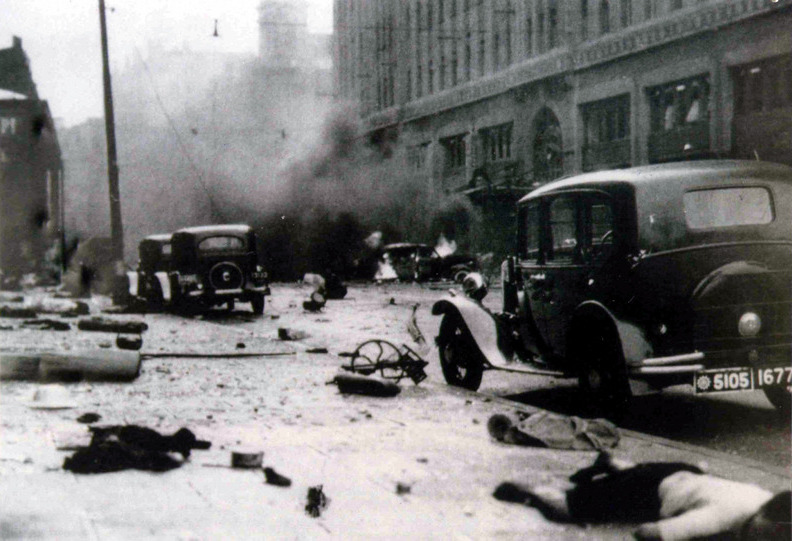
Exterior of Shanghai's Cathay Hotel after an ROC NRA bombing run on August 14, 1937

German newsreel about the attack, September 1937

The frontline fighter aircraft of the Chinese Air Force at the beginning of full-scale hostilities consisted primarily of Curtiss Hawk IIs and Hawk IIIs (many license-built at the CAMCO plant at the Jianqiao Airbase) and the Boeing P-26 Model 281 Peashooter. The Chinese pilots in particular used the Hawk IIIs in various multi-role combat operations against Imperial Japanese positions in and around Shanghai, while the P-26 primarily provided escort cover.

On August 14, 1937, the ROCAF bombed the Japanese Navy flagship Izumo. But in what became known as "Black Saturday", bombs from ROCAF aircraft fell in the Shanghai International Settlement. While the Chinese pilots were instructed not to fly over the Shanghai International Settlement, the Japanese flagship was berthed right in front of it; 700–950 Chinese and foreign civilians were killed outright, with a total of 3,000 of civilian deaths and injuries resulting from the accidental release of the bombs, with most of the death occurring at the Great World entertainment centre, where civilian refugees had gathered after fleeing from the fighting.

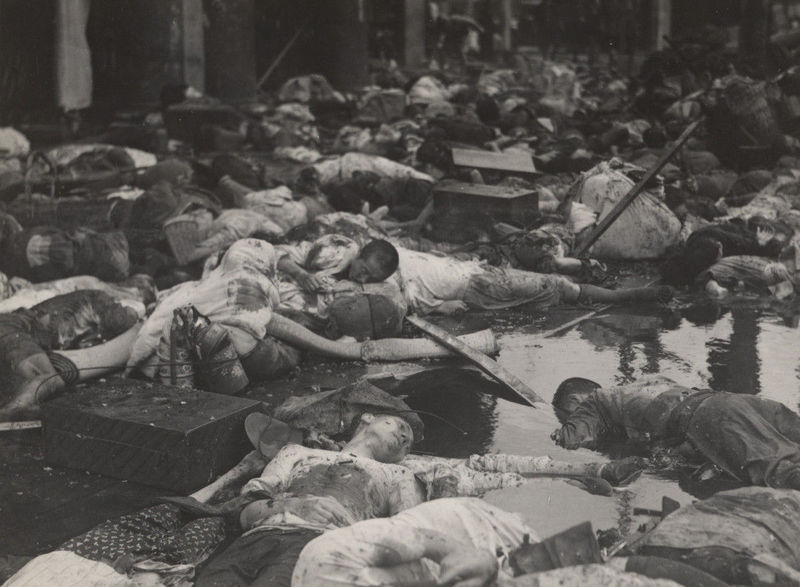
Civilians killed in the accidental August 14 bombing near the Great World.

The bombing was not an intended attack on the International Settlement: the four errant bombs were intended for the Japanese cruiser Izumo, which was moored nearby in the Whangpoo (Huangpu) river, adjacent to the Bund. Two exploded in Nanking Road and two in front of the Great World Amusement Centre on Avenue Edward VII, killing an estimated 2,000 shoppers and passers-by.

Japanese planes responded to the attack on Izumo and the 4th Flying Group of the ROCAF, based in Henan, under the command of Captain Gao Zhihang (高志航), shot down six Japanese planes, while suffering zero losses. (In 1940 the government announced August 14, 1937, would be Air Force Day to raise the morale of the Chinese populace.) From August 15 to 18, the Chinese fought the numerically superior Japanese air force in intense air battles that saw two Japanese squadrons destroyed. China was fighting the air war with every airplane in its possession, some of them purchased second-hand from various countries. It was not able to produce any planes of its own to replace those lost in combat and was always running low on replacement parts and supplies.

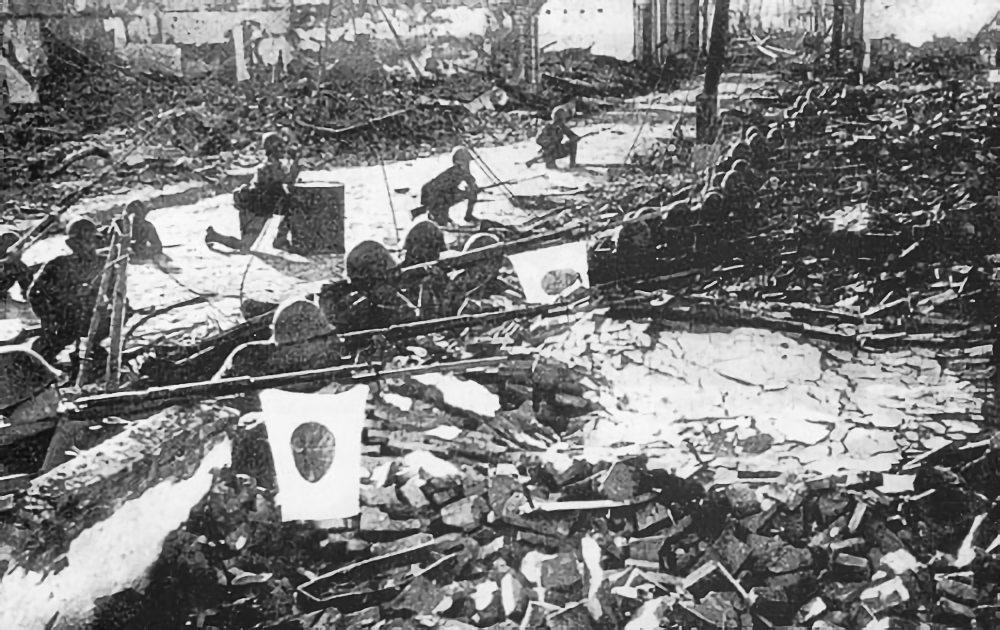
Japanese troops in the ruins of Shanghai

Japan, in contrast, had a robust aviation industry able to design and manufacture technologically advanced planes and could easily make good their losses. Thus, it was impossible for China to sustain an air war with Japan, however, the Chinese Air Force were given a much-needed lifeline with many new replacement fighter aircraft under the new Sino-Soviet Treaty as the initial inventory of American-made aircraft were gradually lost through attrition.

=== Other developments ===
==== Combat around Jiangyin (August 16 – October 30) ====
On August 16, 1937, one-hundred kilometers (62 miles) northwest of Shanghai, the battle for Jiangyin began. Military preparations for the battle began on August 7, when Chinese Secretary of the Navy Chen Shaokuan ordered a blockade at Jiangyin with a force of five light cruisers and one training cruiser along with several mines to prevent Japanese warships from entering the Yangtze River. Admiral Kiyoshi Hasegawa of the Japanese 3rd Fleet ordered aerial bombings of the forces at Jiangyin with carrier and ground-based aircraft, which led to the sinking of ten Chinese ships by October. However, despite these losses, the Chinese navy recovered some of the naval guns from the sunken ships and deployed them on land as coastal batteries, thus maintaining a defensive position at Jiangyin. In early November, Jiangyin was eventually captured after a brief but bloody battle as Chinese forces retreated.

==== Mobilization of the Japanese Army ====
On August 15, the Japanese formed the Shanghai Expeditionary Army (SEF), composed of the 3rd and 11th Divisions, under the command of General Iwane Matsui. On August 19, Japanese Prime Minister Fumimaro Konoe announced that the Sino-Japanese conflict could only be resolved through war, regardless of any attempts at negotiation by third party nations. Konoe said that the initial plan of localized "containment" around the Shanghai region had now escalated to total war, with the ultimate goal of forcing the Chinese government to fully cooperate with the economic and political demands of Japan. On August 23, 1937, the Japanese began the bombing campaign over Nanjing, and various cities in Central China. The Shanghai Expeditionary Army also arrived on the same day.

At the beginning of the battle, Zhang Zhizhong, as the commander of the 5th Army and the Nanjing-Shanghai war zone, was responsible for conducting Chinese operations. The failure of the initial Chinese offensive greatly dismayed Chiang Kai-shek and his staff. Chiang criticized Zhang's failure to make sufficient preparations, especially the procurement of weapons capable of penetrating Japanese bunkers, before sending the troops in massive waves, which resulted in unsustainable casualties in many divisions right from the start. Zhang was also criticized for his overconfidence and his penchant for holding press conferences for both foreign and Chinese reporters in the cosmopolitan city. Chiang Kai-shek and his staff, the most prominent including Chen Cheng and Gu Zhutong, began taking over command duties from Zhang. Chiang Kai-shek himself would eventually become the commander of the third war zone which covers the entirety of Shanghai. Regardless, the Chinese offensives against the Japanese garrison failed despite outnumbering the Japanese troops, due to the lack of heavy weaponry and artillery support.

== Second phase (August 23 – October 26) ==
As the Chinese forces began to withdraw from the Shanghai area, more Japanese troops began to land near Shanghai, inflicting heavy casualties on the Chinese side. The fighting spread across from Shanghai metropolis all the way to the township of Liuhe, near the coast where the majority of the Japanese landings occurred. A manoeuvre Japan had also performed in the 1932 battle and therefore should have been expected.

The perceived strength of the Chinese response resulted in major reinforcement for Japanese units. The 9th, 13th, and 101st Divisions, the 5th Heavy Artillery Brigade, and a brigade-strength mixture of smaller units were ordered from Japan to Shanghai by Imperial General Headquarters on 11 September 1937.

=== Japanese landings (August 23 – September 10) ===
On August 23, 1937, the Japanese 3rd and 11th Divisions made an amphibious assault under the cover of naval bombardment and proceeded to land in Chuanshakou (川沙口), Shizilin (獅子林), and Baoshan (寶山), towns on the northeast coast some fifty kilometers (31 miles) away from downtown Shanghai. Japanese landings in northeast Shanghai suburban areas meant that many Chinese troops, who were deployed in Shanghai's urban center, had to be redeployed to the coastal regions to counter the landings. Thus, the front line was lengthened from metropolitan Shanghai along the Huangpu River to the northeast coastal districts. The Chinese offensive in the urban center had ground to a halt, and the fighting in downtown Shanghai essentially became a stalemate with both sides suffering heavy losses and making minimal changes in the front line. The Chinese divisions would hold on to Zhabei, Jiangwan, and other downtown positions for three months, until situations in other areas made it strategically impossible to continue defending them.

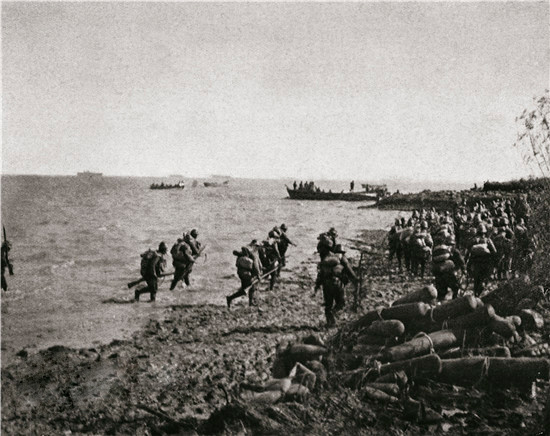
Japanese amphibious landings

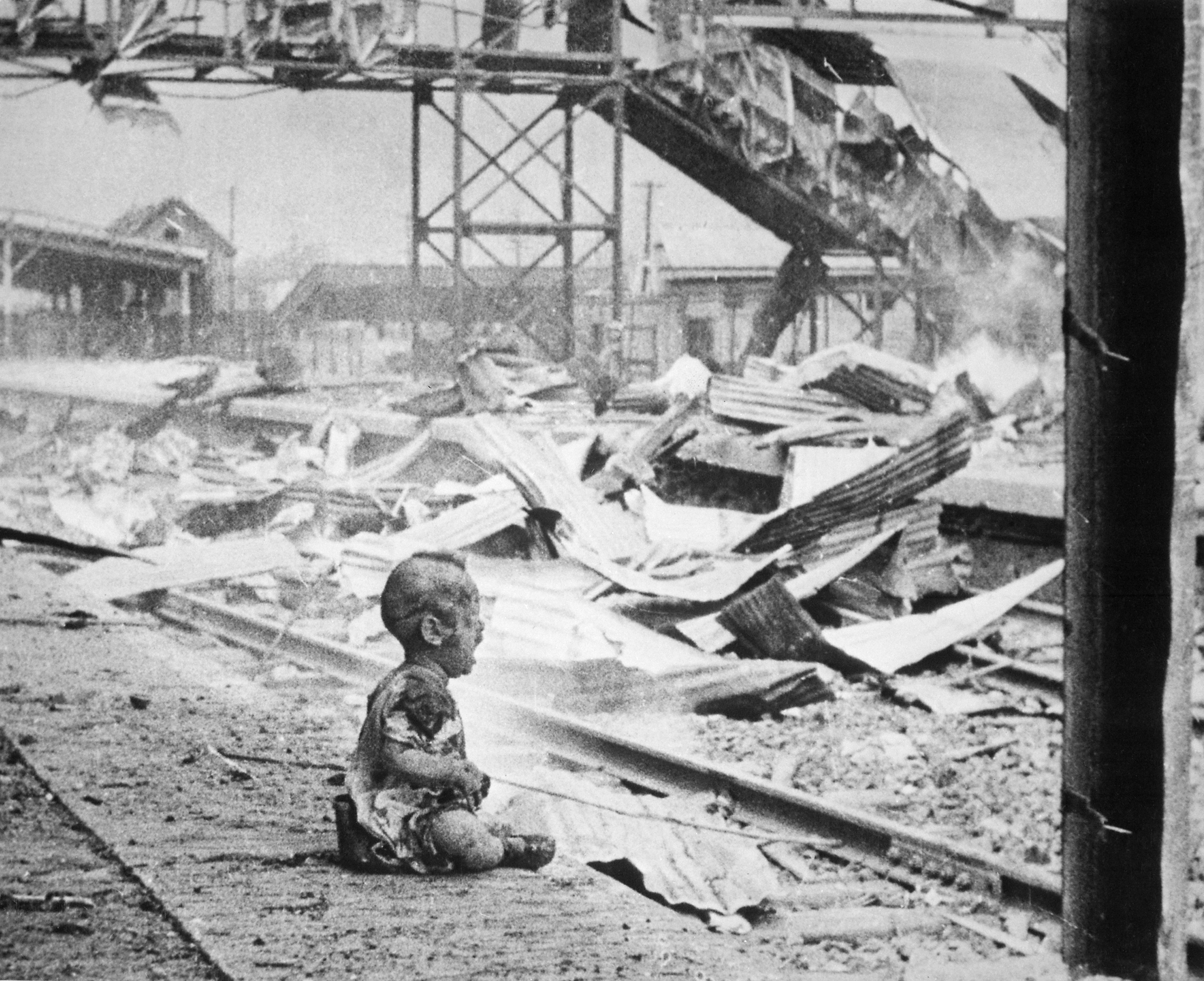
A famous photo entitled "Bloody Saturday", showing a burned and terrified baby in Shanghai's South Station following an IJN aerial attack, August 28, 1937

On August 23, the SEF, led by Iwane Matsui, landed in Liuhe, Wusong (吳淞), and Chuanshakou. Chiang Kai-shek had expected these coastal towns to be vulnerable to Japanese landings and ordered Chen Cheng to reinforce the area with the 18th Army. However, the Chinese were unable to match Japanese firepower. The Japanese almost always began their amphibious assaults with heavy naval and air bombardment of the Chinese coastal defense works and trenches. It was not unheard of for the Chinese to lose an entire garrison to such bombardments. However, the Chinese would reinforce almost immediately to counter the Japanese troops who had just made their landing after the bombardment.

The Japanese, for their part, also suffered heavy casualties in the fighting. In one occasion, a hidden Chinese artillery position on Wusong killed several hundred Japanese troops before it was neutralized. Emperor Hirohito's cousin-in-law was among those killed by Chinese soldiers during the landings. On August 28, 1937, alone, two hundred Japanese soldiers were killed while attempting to secure a beachhead near the coastal town of Baoshan.""

=== Fighting for the Coast (August 23 – September 10) ===
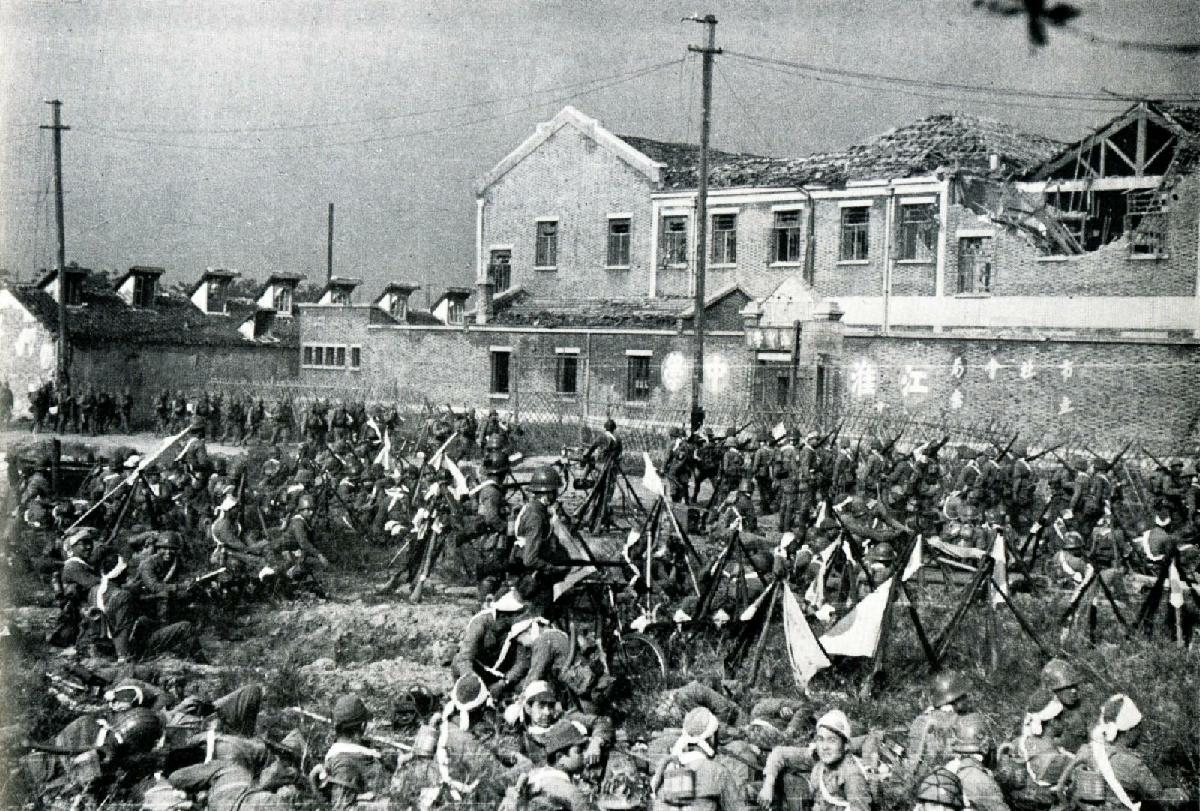
Japanese soldiers mass in a town outside of Shanghai

In the two weeks that followed, the Chinese and Japanese troops fought bitter battles in the numerous towns and villages along the coast. The Chinese troops fending off the amphibious assaults had only their small-caliber weapons to depend on, and were not sufficiently supported by the ROCAF and the almost nonexistent Chinese navy. They paid heavily for the defense. An entire regiment could be reduced to just a few men in action. In addition, Chinese coastal defense works were hastily constructed and did not offer much protection against enemy attacks, as many trenches were newly constructed during lulls in fighting. Moreover, the sandy soil of the coastal region meant that it was difficult to construct sturdy fortifications. Many trenches would collapse due to rain. The Chinese raced against time to construct and repair these defense works despite constant Japanese bombardment.Logistics difficulty also meant it was hard to transport the necessary construction materials to the front line. The Chinese often had to turn to bombed-out houses to obtain bricks, beams, and other such materials.

However, the Chinese fought against great odds and tried to hold on to the coastal villages as long as they could. It was commonplace for the Japanese to successfully occupy the towns in the day under heavy naval support, only to lose them during the night to Chinese counterattacks. On September 4, Chinese soldiers killed 200 Japanese soldiers attempting to land near Shanghai.

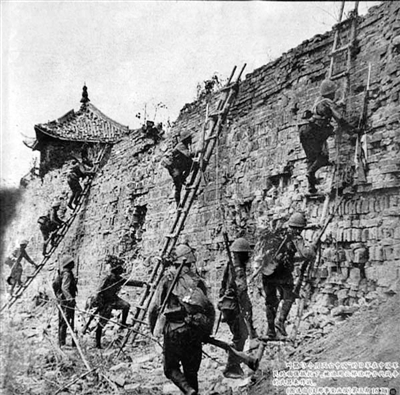
Japanese soldiers scaling Baoshan's walls

Such attacks and counterattacks continued well into late August, when the fall of Baoshan, a vital coastal town, seemed imminent. Chiang Kai-shek ordered the remaining troops of the 98th Division to defend the walled town. One battalion, under lieutenant colonel Yao Ziqing (姚子青), was assigned to the task. The situation in Baoshan was grim, as the Japanese had surrounded the town by September 5. However, Yao ordered his men to defend to the death, pledging to die at his post. Several Japanese assaults on September 4 were repulsed with heavy casualties, but a Japanese tank assault with air support broke through the gate the next day. The Chinese defenders were gradually pushed into a shrinking perimeter, and only had 100 troops by sunset. Yao ordered a single soldier to escape the city and deliver news of the unit's impeding fate. The soldier succeeded in delivering his message, which was simply: "We are determined to continue fighting the enemy until each and every one of us is killed."

On the next day, September 6, 1937, Baoshan fell. By that point, Japanese artillery strikes had reduced the town to rubble, and Yao had been killed in house-to-house fighting. The entire battalion, except for the single soldier sent outside, was killed in action. The Chinese would continue to sustain this level of casualties throughout the Shanghai campaign.

=== Combat around Luodian (September 11–30) ===
On September 11, with the fall of Baoshan, the Chinese Army moved into defensive positions around the small town of Luodian (羅店), the transportation center connecting Baoshan, downtown Shanghai, Jiading, Songjiang and several other towns with highways. The successful defense of Luodian was strategically paramount to the security of Suzhou and Shanghai; as early as August 29, German adviser Alexander von Falkenhausen had advised Chiang Kai-shek that the town must be held at all costs, as it was "the most crucial strategic point".

The Japanese had also recognized Luodian's importance, and had sent troops to attack the town on August 23. Two large assaults were repelled by the Chinese 11th Division, who overcame Japanese advantages in armor and artillery by harassing Japanese columns with small scale ambushes and engaging in close-quarters street fighting within Luodian.

To defend Luodian, the Chinese concentrated some 300,000 soldiers there, while the Japanese amassed more than 100,000 troops, supported by naval gunfire, tanks, and aircraft.

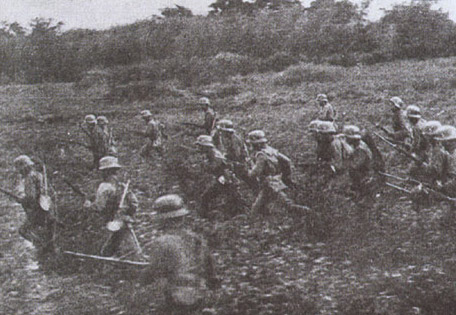
Chinese troops making a charge in Luodian

The carnage and intensity of the resulting battle earned the fight for Luodian the nickname "grinding mill of flesh and blood" (血肉磨坊). Japanese assaults typically began at daybreak with concentrated aerial bombing, followed by the release of observation balloons to pinpoint the exact location of remaining Chinese positions for artillery and naval strikes. Japanese infantry would then advance under smoke screens, with armored support. Japanese planes would also accompany the infantry and strafe Chinese reinforcements. The battle for Luodian was marked by bloody street fighting, with the close combat making the Chinese the equals of the Japanese.

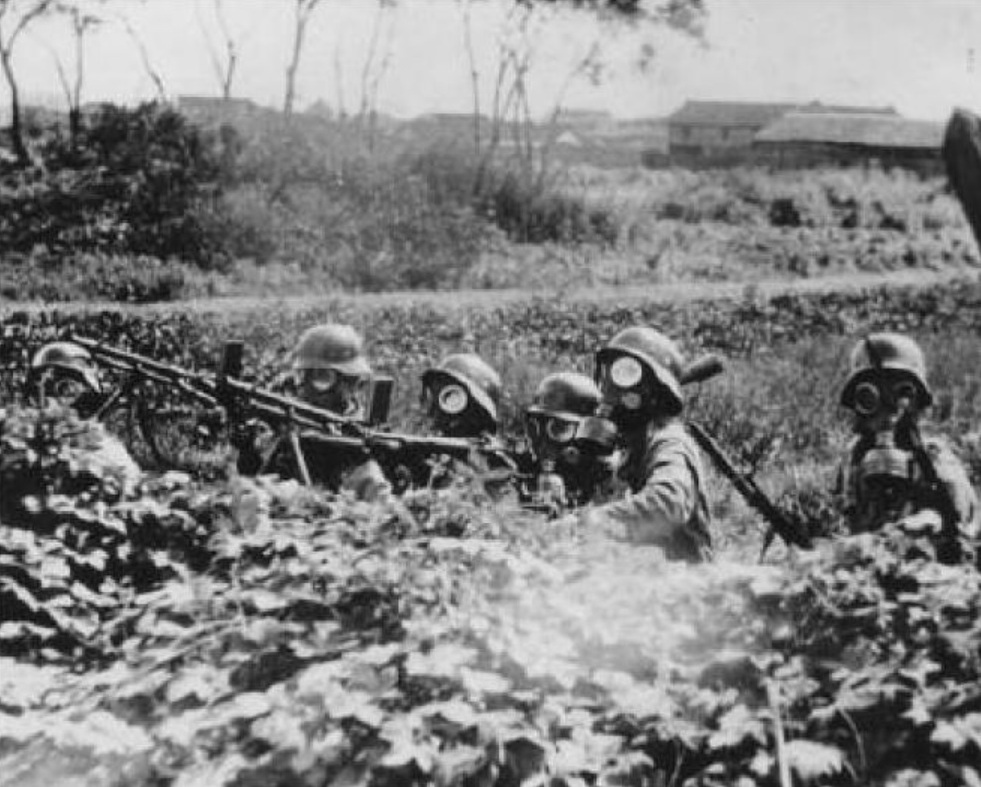
Chinese soldiers near Luodian, equipped with gas masks

Chinese defense was stubborn even in the face of overwhelming firepower. During the night, Chinese soldiers mined the roads connecting the coastal towns to Luodian and engaged in night combat to cut off Japanese advance troops. At daybreak, the Chinese would garrison the foremost defensive lines with comparatively few troops in order to reduce casualties resulting from intense Japanese bombardments. The Chinese would then emerge from rear positions to engage the enemy when the Japanese land offensive started after naval and artillery strikes had ceased.

The 44th Infantry Regiment of the Japanese 11th Division had been in a stand-off with the 1st Battalion of the 65th Regiment of the Chinese 11th Division at the "white house" since Luodian was occupied. On September 19, engineers dug a tunnel towards the "white house". On September 23, the 44th Infantry Regiment utilized the tunnel to plant explosives on the walls and stormed the fortification through the gaps in the walls. The defenders were forced to retreat after suffering more than 50% casualties and the position was occupied. Despite the loss of the "white house", Lin Yindong (林映東), the commander of the 1st Battalion, was awarded the A-2 grade for the "Medal of the Armed Forces" and promoted to lieutenant colonel and regimental attaché of the 66th Regiment for holding onto the "white house" for nearly a month against a numerically-superior foe.

Despite their numerical superiority, the defense of Luodian would prove impossible for the Chinese. The Japanese superiority of firepower forced the Chinese into a passive position, from which they could not mount counter-attacks until the Japanese were practically on top of them. Because of this, the decision was made to defend the entire town to the death, a tactic which greatly accelerated the attrition rate within the Chinese ranks. The casualty rate of General Chen Cheng's group army was more than fifty percent, with more than 15,000 losses. Units of Xue Yue's 19th Group Army also took part in combat southwest of Luodian and suffered heavy losses. The 59th and 90th Divisions of the 4th Army suffered seventy to eighty percent casualties in just five days. The Training Brigade of the 66th Army suffered 3,003 casualties after several days of fighting. By the end of September, the Chinese had been almost bled dry and were forced to give up Luodian.

=== Battles for Liujiahang and Gujiazhai (September 12 – October 2) ===
By September 12, 1937, Luodian, Wusong, Baoshan, Yuepu, and Yanghang had fallen. The Japanese 11th Division pursued Chen Cheng's 15th Group Army southwest of Luodian and the Japanese 3rd Division attempted to capture the Liujiahang (劉家行) and Gujiazhai (顧家宅) positions on the right wing of the Chinese group army. The 3rd Division first made contact with the 78th Division of the 1st Army near Gushifang (顧十房) on September 12. On September 13, the 18th and 34th Infantry Regiments launched a direct assault at the outer positions of the Chinese defenses supported by artillery, breaching the positions of the 32nd Division of the Northwestern Army. The positions of the 464th Regiment of the 78th Division at Qinjiatang (秦家塘) were all destroyed and were soon occupied by the 18th Infantry Regiment. The 3rd Regiment of the 1st Division was ordered to occupy the positions at Chenzhai (陳宅) and Wangzhai (王宅) to block further Japanese advance. The 86th Regiment of the 15th Division of the Hunan Army cooperated with the 464th Regiment to attack the 18th Infantry Regiment from three sides, forcing the Japanese regiment to withdraw towards Qinjiatang. That night, the 1st, 15th, and 32nd Divisions took advantage of heavy rain to launch an all-out attack, recapturing Qinjiatang and the positions of the 32nd Division which had been lost that day. In the early morning of September 14, the 3rd Regiment repelled an attack by the 18th Infantry Regiment at Yangjiufang (楊九房) and the 78th Division fought fiercely all day long. The 34th Infantry Regiment encountered fierce resistance from the 32nd Division and made little progress. On September 15, the 32nd Division's positions at Xiaozhuzhai (小朱宅) and Huoshachang (火燒場) were captured by the 34th Infantry Regiment and the Chinese division suffered very heavy casualties. The 78th Division repelled several Japanese attacks at Douzhai (竇宅) and Zitenghai (紫藤海).

On September 16, 1937, the positions of the 709th Regiment of the 37th Separate Brigade and the 86th Regiment at the Yangjiayan (楊家沿) line were breached. The 2nd Battalion of the 2nd Regiment of the 1st Division and the 95th Regiment of the 16th Division counterattacked the 18th Infantry Regiment and stabilized the line. The 86th Regiment then withdrew due to heavy casualties and was replaced by the 2nd Regiment. At the same time, the 34th Infantry Regiment launched a fierce assault under the cover of artillery and aircraft. The 1st Battalion attacked the 85th Regiment of the 15th Division at Yangmu Bridge (楊木橋), causing very heavy casualties on the Chinese regiment. The 89th Regiment reinforced the 85th Regiment and halted the attack. In the evening, the 12th Company of the 3rd Battalion captured the Jinjiawan (金家灣) position. The 96th Regiment of the 16th Division was quickly sent in and launched an offensive at Jinjiawan at dawn the next day.

On September 17, 1937, the 18th Infantry Regiment attacked the positions of the 1st Division at the Xisheng Bridge (西盛橋) and Chenzhai line, capturing the position of the 2nd Battalion of the 2nd Regiment and inflicting heavy casualties. The Japanese regiment then attacked Zhangzhai (張宅) and captured Wangzhai (王宅). The 337th Regiment of the 57th Division counterattacked and regained Wangzhai. The 18th Infantry Regiment launched a fierce attack at Wangzhai under the cover of artillery and occupied the position again, which was recaptured again after a counterattack from the 4th Regiment of the 1st Division. As the 96th Regiment was attacking Jinjiawan, the newly-arrived 475th Brigade of the 159th Division of the 66th Army of the Guangdong Army also launched an offensive against the 34th Infantry Regiment supported by the 85th and 89th Regiments of the 15th Division. At the same time, the 34th Infantry Regiment sent the 2nd and 3rd Battalions supported by artillery to rescue the 12th Company. As the fierce fighting continued, the 16th Division sent a battalion to attack the enemy through the 85th and 89th Regiments. The two battalions of the 34th Infantry Regiment were unable to reach Jinjiawan to rescue the besieged company and retreated. The Chinese units cleared the position and the 12th Company was wiped out.

On September 18, 1937, the 18th Infantry Regiment continued attacking Zhangzhai and Wangzhai, capturing Wangzhai and causing heavy casualties on the 3rd Company of the 1st Battalion of the 2nd Regiment. Li Youmei (李友梅), the commander of the 4th Regiment, led his troops to counterattack the Japanese regiment. Throughout the day, Wangzhai changed hands multiple times and regimental commander Li Youmei was killed in the fierce fighting. The 95th Regiment was ordered to take over the position of the 4th Regiment. At midnight, the 66th Army (except for the Training Brigade) and the 77th Division took over the positions of the 15th and 32nd Divisions. The 15th Division was responsible for guarding the positions near Liujiahang and the 32nd Division was withdrawn for replenishment, reduced to only more than 900 combat soldiers after nearly a week of fighting. The Training Brigade of the 66th Army had earlier been ordered to replace the 14th Division at positions southwest of Luodian.

On September 19, 1937, the 18th Infantry Regiment broke into Wangzhai again, wiping out the 2nd Company of the 4th Regiment. The 468th Regiment of the 78th Division quickly sent a company to counterattack alongside the 4th Regiment and fought fiercely until the next day to regain the position. On the 20th, the 169th Brigade of the 57th Division took over the position of the 1st Division at Zhangzhai, Wangzhai, and Wangjiufang (王九房). On the same day, the 3rd Battalion of the 339th Regiment of the brigade was attacked by the 18th Infantry Regiment at Wangzhai and held its ground despite losing more than half of its troops. On September 21, the 78th Division, which had defended Douzhai (竇宅) since the 16th, was replaced by the newly-arrived Hunanese 8th Division. At the Jinjiawan area, the 159th Division and the 34th Infantry Regiment were stuck in several days of tug-of-war, with heavy casualties on both sides. By dawn on September 23, the 952nd Regiment, which was the main defending force, had only 1 regimental commander, 1 company commander, and just over 100 soldiers left. On September 23, the Japanese 3rd Division bombarded the positions of the 66th Army with fierce artillery fire. Seven companies of the 159th Division and two companies of the 160th Division were completely annihilated under intensive bombardment and all positions were destroyed with no survivors. The 34th Infantry Regiment finally occupied Jinjiawan and Seli (啬里). In just a week of fighting, the 159th Division had lost combat effectiveness and three of its four regiments had a total of just over 1,000 soldiers left.

On September 22, 1937, the 68th Infantry Regiment joined the battle. From the 21st until the 24th of September, the 18th Infantry Regiment launched a series of fierce attacks at Chenzhai, Zhangzhai, Wangzhai, and Wangjiufang positions and was resisted by the 57th Division. By the 24th, due to heavy casualties, the 66th Army and the 77th Division had to shrink their defense lines and the 159th Division withdrew from the battlefield after handing over its positions to the 160th Division. On September 25, the 8th, 16th, and 57th Divisions of the 69th Army were also ordered to retreat to the second-line positions. On the Japanese side, the 34th Infantry Regiment had also suffered heavy casualties and took several days of rest.

As most of the Chinese units retreated to their designated locations, some Chinese units remained to provide cover. On September 25, 1937, the 461st Regiment of the 77th Division was attacked as it held onto its original position and suffered heavy casualties, forcing the regiment to retreat. As the Chinese units withdraw, the 18th, 34th, and 68th Infantry Regiments pursued them, occupying the abandoned positions while engaging with Chinese rear-guard units. On September 28, the 6th Infantry Regiment of the 3rd Division and the 101st Division joined the battle. The next day, the 9th Division also participated in the attack on Liujiahang. On September 30, the 6th and 68th Infantry Regiments launched a massive assault against the 15th and 77th Divisions at the Taipingqiao (太平橋) and Wanqiao (萬橋) positions, causing heavy casualties on the 77th Division. The 19th Infantry Regiment of the 9th Division also attacked at the same time as the 3rd Division. In the evening of the same day, the Third Military Front ordered the troops at Liujiahang and surrounding locations to retreat to Chenjiahang (陳家行) and Guangfu (廣福) at the west bank of Wenzaobin (蘊藻濱). On October 1, Liujiahang was occupied by the 34th Infantry Regiment. The next day, the 8th and 16th Divisions also retreated, and the Japanese army occupied Gujiazhai.

The bloody battle had costed the Chinese Army dearly in terms of manpower. The 159th and 160th Divisions of the 66th Army alone suffered 7,113 casualties. The 15th Division suffered more than three-fourths casualties and was reduced to nine companies. The 8th, 16th, and 57th Divisions of the 69th Army and the 1st and 78th Divisions of the 1st Army all suffered heavy casualties. Luo Lin (羅霖), the commander of the 77th Division, was put under investigation for the retreat from Taipingqiao. Chen Cheng pointed out that the division had suffered more than 3,000 casualties defending the bridges and requested that the divisional commander be given a lighter punishment. On the other side, the Japanese 3rd Division also suffered heavy casualties. Its 34th Infantry Regiment alone suffered approximately 1,300 casualties in the battle. The 6th Infantry Regiment claimed to have killed 500 Chinese soldiers of the 77th and 160th Divisions while suffering 53 killed and 86 wounded in the battles near Liujiahang and Gujiazhai from September 28 to October 2, 1937.

Throughout the course of the battle, the 1st, 78th, 32nd, and 159th Divisions were temporarily withdrawn for rest or reorganization after suffering heavy casualties. The rest of the 66th Army, 15th Division, and 77th Division were also temporarily withdrawn for rest after the fall of Liujiahang. The 8th and 16th Divisions were transferred to the Tangqiao-Lujiaqiao-Chenjiahang line and cooperated with a part of the Tax Police Corps to form a strong defensive barrier and resisted the Japanese 9th Division for the next week. The 57th Division was transferred to the Mengjiazhai (孟家宅) area.

=== Battle for Wusong Creek and Dachang (October 1–26) ===
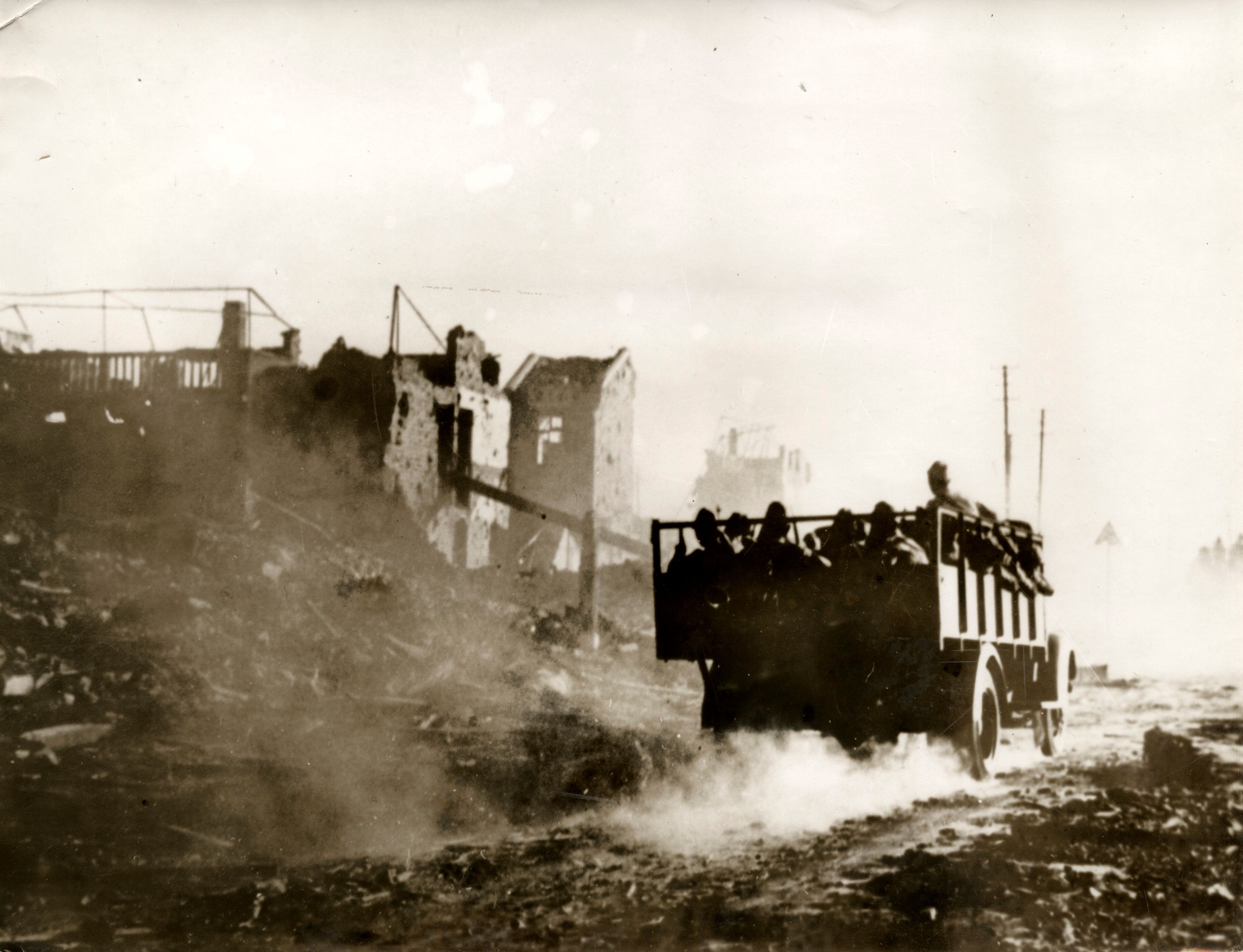
A Japanese truck transports troops through the ruins of Shanghai. September 24, 1937.

By October 1, the Japanese had increased troop strength in the Shanghai region to more than two hundred thousand. Japanese troops also invaded the town of Liuhang (劉行), south of Luodian. Thus, the frontline moved further south onto the banks of the Wusong River. The Japanese aim was to cross the Creek and take the walled town of Dachang (大場), which was the communications link between Chinese troops in downtown Shanghai and the northwest outlying towns. If Dachang fell, Chinese troops would have to forfeit their positions in downtown Shanghai and regions east of the Huangpu River to avoid encirclement by the Japanese. The defense of Dachang was vital to how long the Chinese army could continue fighting in the Shanghai war zone; for this, Chiang Kai-shek mobilized whatever remaining troops he could find.

To combat the nearly 200,000 Japanese troops on the Shanghai battlefield in early October, the Kuomintang Army deployed over 700,000 troops across the wide front, encompassing not only Chiang Kai-shek's troops under the command of Zhang Zhizhong and Chen Cheng which had been fighting since the start of the battle, but also units of the former Hunan, Guizhou, and Beiyang Armies that had been incorporated into Chiang Kai-shek's army alongside warlord armies of Guangdong, Hunan, Guangxi, Sichuan, the Northeast, the Northwest, Henan, Zhejiang, Fujian, and Hubei. (Note: The 60th Army of the Yunnan Army was still marching to Shanghai when the city fell on November 12. The army was then ordered to take part in the defense of Nanjing but the capital city also fell on December 13 while the Yunnan troops were en route.)

To compensate for artillery shortages, Matsui massed four Japanese divisions, some 60,000 men, in a 6-mile front to break through the Chinese lines via brute frontal assaults.

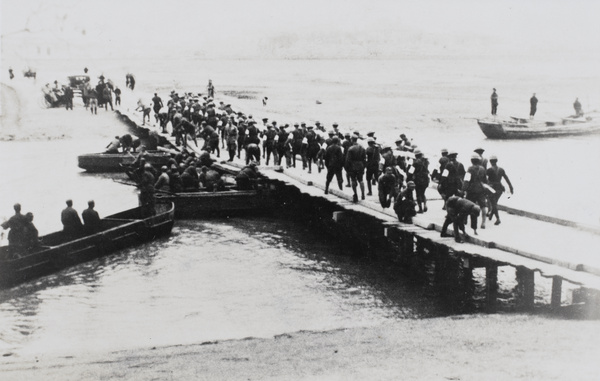
Japanese soldiers cross a pontoon bridge in the river country north of Shanghai

The Chinese focused their defensive line on the Wusong Creek, a natural defensive position with a six-foot tall embankment and a width of up to three hundred feet across. The Chinese, learning from the lessons of their German advisors from the Battle of Verdun and the Battle of the Somme, had fortified the southern bank with a dense network of defenses, including barbed wire, machine gun nests, artillery emplacements, pillboxes and trenches. The local buildings and farmhouses were reinforced with sandbags and barbed wire, and trees had been cut down to ensure open fields of fire.

On October 5, 1937, the Japanese forces smashed into the Chinese defenses across the Wusong Creek, but were immediately met by heavy resistance. The Chinese fought back against the assault fiercely, pummeling the Japanese bridgeheads with concentrated and coordinated artillery fire from six artillery battalions, which were reinforced with 2 cm and 3.7 cm anti-aircraft guns to protect against Japanese aircraft.

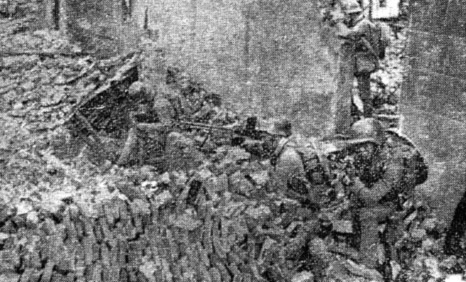
Chinese soldiers near a bombed-out building

The two armies would engage in seesaw battles, with little changes in the frontline. House to house fighting was common, and in the most intense moments these positions would change hands up to five times a day. In this brutal combat, Chinese soldiers regularly fought to the death even when surrounded, a result of the Japanese Army's habit of taking no prisoners. In overrun positions, Japanese soldiers frequently found dead Chinese soldiers, some with childlike features, clutching weapons as though "their ghosts had returned to continue resistance". In one case, the village of Tangbeizhai was defended against a Japanese column by a single Chinese soldier, as the rest of his battalion had already been destroyed. In another case on October 18, the Japanese had surrounded a force of 1,400 Chinese soldiers near Dachang; every soldier in the Chinese unit died, as did some 3,000 attacking Japanese.

From September 11 to October 20, the Japanese army was able to advance only five kilometers. It was in this fighting where the Japanese suffered their heaviest losses of the entire campaign, estimated at 25,000 casualties with some 8,000 killed in action over a 20-day period between October 5 and October 25. The 101st Division alone suffered 3,000 casualties in four days of combat around Wusong Creek, and the 9th Division suffered some 9,556 casualties for an advance of 2.5 miles.

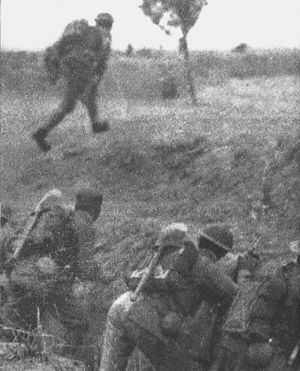
Chinese soldiers engaged in trench warfare

Despite heavy casualties, the Japanese would eventually breach the Wusong Creek line, seizing the Tangqiaozhan bridge from the Chinese Tax Police Division after two days of intense fighting. However, even though the Japanese penetrated the Wusong Creek line, they were confronted with further belts of similar defenses built around a series of creeks anchored by Zoumatang Creek. The two armies became bogged down in trench warfare around a mostly stagnant frontline, with heavy rains transforming the terrain into a muddy landscape.

On October 14, 1937, the Guangxi Army under Li Zongren and Bai Chongxi finally arrived to join Chiang Kai-shek's Central Army in the battle for Shanghai. These Guangxi units, four divisions in total, then staged a final counteroffensive on October 21 in an attempt to fully consolidate Chinese positions around Dachang and retake the banks of the Wusong Creek. However, the counteroffensive was poorly coordinated with little reconnaissance, and quickly bogged down despite some initial success. The Japanese would counterattack with artillery, tanks and poison gas on October 23, with Japanese aircraft wreaking havoc on Chinese divisions throughout daytime. The operation was halted, and had cost the Guangxi divisions over 2,000 casualties including dozens of officers. In just eight days, the four participating divisions of the 21st Group Army of the Guangxi Army had lost two-thirds of its soldiers, with the three-division strong 48th Army suffering 4,101 killed, 3,030 wounded, and 2,600 missing.

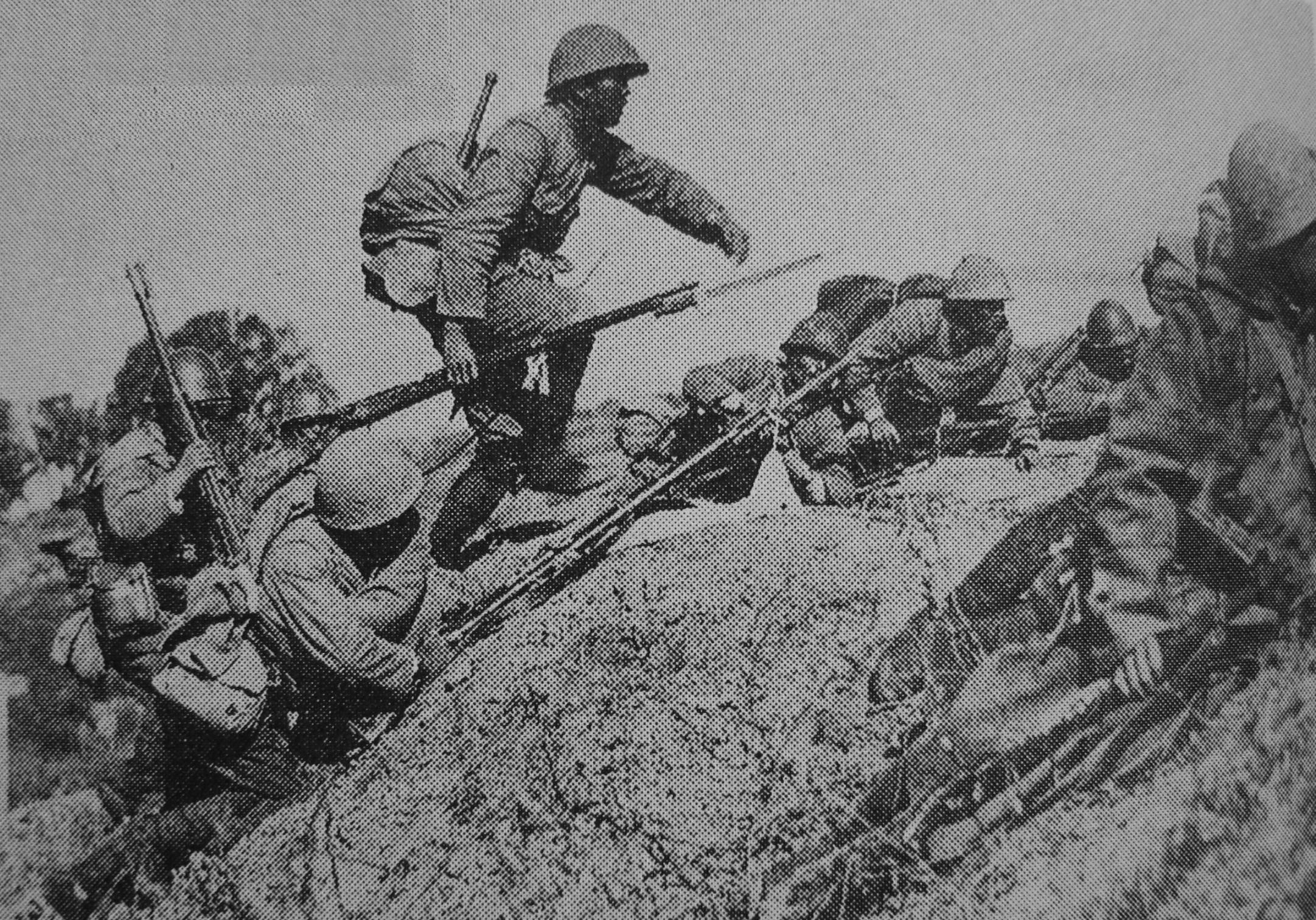
Japanese troops attacking near Dachang, October 26th

Following the failed counteroffensive, Matsui ordered his divisions to push to Zoumatang Creek. The Chinese, having been exhausted by the combat through October, had begun withdrawing their troops to a defensive line behind Suzhou Creek. The Japanese, aided by their tanks and aircraft, seized two bridges across the Zoumatang Creek and pushed the remaining Chinese forces back to Dachang. The remnants of the 3rd Division, 87th Division, and the 106th Brigade of the 36th Division and the recently arrived 18th Division were tasked with defending Dachang and its surrounding areas after retreating from Wenzaobin. The Japanese then utilized some 700 artillery pieces and 400 aircraft including 150 bombers for the assault on Dachang and reduced the town to rubble. They then followed up with an armored spearhead of some 40 tanks. The Chinese defenders, having withdrawn their artillery to safer positions beforehand, were outgunned and overwhelmed. The fighting continued until October 26, when Dachang finally fell. Feeling responsible for its loss, Zhu Yaohua (朱耀華), the commander of the 18th Division, attempted to commit suicide but survived the shot. By then, Chinese troops had no option but to withdraw from downtown Shanghai, which they had held for almost three months.

=== Combat near Guangfu (October 2 – November 1) ===
On October 1, 1937, the freshly-arrived Hunanese 13th Division occupied the forward positions of Guangfu (廣福) and Zhubeizhai (朱北宅). On October 3, the Japanese 9th Division, based on intelligence reports from the China Expeditionary Army and aerial reconnaissance, judged that a large number of Chinese soldiers were gathering near Guangfu after retreating from Liujiahang. On October 2 and October 3, the 18th Infantry Brigade of the Japanese division launched attacks on the positions of the 73rd and 77th Regiments of the Chinese 13th Division with the support from aircraft and artillery. Both regiments suffered heavy casualties but halted the offensive of the Japanese brigade. At the same time, the Chinese 9th Division was ordered to advance to the Yujiazhai (虞家宅), Beiying (北營), and Zhangpuqiao (張浦橋) areas to support the 13th Division. On October 4, the Japanese Army bombarded the Wuzhai (吳宅) and Zhangjiazhai (張家宅) positions. The 18th Infantry Brigade launched a fierce assault at the position north of Guangfu but was hit by a counterattack from the Chinese 13th Division. The Japanese division also crossed the Yangjing River (楊涇河) but faced stubborn resistance and was unable to move further. The 13th Division sacrificed the bulk of one battalion and two-thirds of another battalion that day. The Japanese division also suffered considerable casualties, with its 1st Battalion of the 19th Infantry Regiment suffering 40 killed and 82 wounded in the three-day battle. On October 5, the Japanese 9th Division turned to Chenjiahang and the responsibility of capturing Guangfu was handed over to the Japanese 13th Division.

After completing its offensive preparation, the Japanese 13th Division began its attack on October 12, 1937 with the 65th and 104th Infantry Regiments with support from artillery, aircraft, and engineers. However, it encountered fierce resistance from the Chinese 13th Division at Laoluzhai (老陸宅) and did not make lasting progress until the 17th. Similarly, its attacks on the position of the 958th regiment of the 160th Division of the 66th Army at Sanjiacun (三家村) were constantly repelled. Any gains made would be lost on the same day from Chinese counterattacks and both sides suffered heavy casualties.

On October 18, 1937, after a day of hard fighting, the 65th Infantry Regiment occupied the northern part of Laoluzhai, and the 104th Infantry Regiment occupied the corner of Sanjiacun. At the same time, the 958th Regiment was replaced by the 959th Regiment due to heavy casualties. The next day, the 65th Infantry Regiment, with the support of 39 howitzers and the main force of the 13th Division's artillery regiment, repeatedly attacked the Laoluzhai position, at one point breaking through the Chinese defense but was immediately driven back by the Chinese 13th Division's counterattack. As a result of heavy casualties in many days of fighting, the Chinese division had to deploy the engineer battalion and special forces company to the first defense line. At the same time, the 104th Infantry Regiment bombarded the Sanjiacun position all day long, causing more than 50% casualties for the 1st Battalion of the 959th Regiment. On October 20, the 104th Infantry Regiment, with close air and artillery support, finally broke through the first defense line at Sanjiacun, killing all the defenders. On October 21, the 58th Infantry Regiment launched a massive attack under the cover of aircraft and artillery at the Chinese 13th Division's position at Xinmuqiao (新木橋). The Chinese division resisted with all their strength, but the unit had been exhausted after two weeks of fighting. Xinmuqiao fell, and the 58th Infantry Regiment tried to use the momentum to capture Guangfu in one fell swoop, but was blocked by the remnants of the Chinese 13th Division supported by a battalion of the 160th Division. The 116th Infantry Regiment attacked and occupied Daijiazhai (戴家宅) south of Xinmuqiao to support the 58th Infantry Regiment. At dawn on October 22, the Chinese 13th Division completed its handover of the forward positions of Guangfu to the 98th Division, and withdrew to Taicang (太倉) for reorganization.

Since mid-September, the 98th Division had been recovering from the losses it had suffered in the battles of Yuepu and Baoshan. After reaching Guangfu, it immediately sent the 292nd Brigade to launch a counterattack against the 58th Infantry Regiment on the night of October 21. At the same time, the 66th Army formed its own assault team consisting of one regiment from the 159th Division and three regiments from the 160th Division and participated in the counterattack. The 9th Division and 57th Division of the Central Army in the peripherals each sent one battalion for the attack. The Japanese 13th Division struggled under the assault of more than six regiments, and both sides suffered heavy casualties. On the morning of October 22, 1937, the counterattack was called off and each Chinese unit returned to their defensive positions. In these two days, the 13th Division recorded 727 of its soldiers being wounded in action.

On October 23, 1937, the 13th Division continued its attack towards Guangfu. The 65th and 104th Infantry Regiments advanced towards Laoluzhai and Sanjiacun. The 104th Infantry Regiment encircled and captured Sanjiacun with three infantry battalions, nearly wiping out the two defending companies of the 160th Division. The Japanese Army accused the Chinese Army of using poison gas near Sanjiacun. At the same time, the 65th Infantry Regiment attempted to capture Laoluzhai but was repelled by the 57th Division. At 17:00 p.m., the 159th Division, which after the battles for Liujiahang and Gujiazhai had a total of only 347 officers and 3,020 soldiers left, sent the 953rd Regiment under Hong Shiyang (洪世揚) to take over the positions of the 160th Division at Sanjiacun and Laoluzhai.

On October 24 and October 25, 1937, the 58th and 65th Infantry Regiments failed to make any progress against the 953rd Regiment at Majiazhai and the 98th Division in front of Xinmuqiao. The 116th Infantry Regiment launched a massive assault at the Mengjiazhai position, destroying all fortifications of the 57th Division and causing heavy casualties on the Chinese division. Divisional commander Ruan Zhaochang (阮肇昌) requested the 90th Division of the 4th Army sent a battalion as support. With the help of reinforcements, the 57th Division was able to halt the attack, causing more than 500 casualties on the 116th Infantry Regiment. The next day, aircraft and artillery repeatedly bombed the positions of the 57th Division, destroying all the repaired fortifications. The 116th Infantry Regiment quickly broke through and occupied Mengjiazhai and Gejiatou (葛家頭). On October 26, the 13th Division continued attacking but made little progress under tenacious Chinese resistance. On October 27, the 58th Infantry Regiment broke into the first-line positions south of Guangfu using trench warfare. On the same day, the 3rd Battalion of the 65th Infantry Regiment attempted to cross the Yangjing River. A part of the 10th Company was fired upon while crossing the river and all of them were killed. More than 20 troops of the 12th Company successfully crossed the river and broke into the southern corner of Majiazhai, but were similarly wiped out by the 953rd Regiment. By then, the 3rd Battalion had only more than 100 soldiers left. The 953rd Regiment suffered dozens of casualties in the engagement. On that night, 3,234 soldiers and laborers from six supplementary battalions were received by the 66th Army, one-third of whom went to the 159th Division and the remaining two-thirds went to the 160th Division.

On October 28, 1937, the 116th Infantry Regiment launched an offensive supported by howitzers at Xinluzhai (新陸宅), part of the 57th Division's defense line, but was unable to break through the position and suffered heavy casualties. Captain Yazaki, the 2nd Battalion commander of the regiment, was killed in action leading his men at the front-line. Brigade commander Guan Huimin (官惠民) of the 90th Division was killed in action fighting the 116th Infantry Regiment at Gejiatou. On the same day, the 953rd Regiment accused the Japanese army of using poison gas. From October 23 until October 28, the Japanese 13th Division recorded their losses as 2,604 killed or wounded and claimed their enemy's losses since the 22nd as 5,000–6,000 killed or wounded. The next day, two battalions of the 65th Infantry Regiment attempted to cross the Yangjing River again with the cooperation of artillery and engineers, each battalion having only more than 200 troops left. As they were crossing the river, they were suddenly hit by intensive gunfire and mortar shells. Major Kobata, adjutant of the 65th Infantry Regiment, was killed in action. Major Yamaguchi, the commander of the 1st Battalion, was wounded in action and the attacking troops suffered heavy casualties. The defending 953rd Regiment also lost dozens of troops including 1 battalion commander wounded and 1 battalion adjutant killed.

The 65th Infantry Regiment had suffered too many casualties after four failed crossing attempts in nine days. In what was described as 'a thousand years of regret', the 65th Infantry Regiment was ordered to stop its attack at Majiazhai and withdrew for rest. That night, the Shanghai Expeditionary Army ordered the 13th Division to take over the position of the Shigeto Task Force, thus giving up their mission of breaking through Guangfu. On October 30, the 13th Division found that the enemy's position had been quiet since last night and judged that they were retreating, and ordered all units to carry out searches and attack the enemy as a final attempt before they were transferred. They discovered that, except for a few positions that had been destroyed after several days of artillery bombardment, the fortifications and defensive positions were still very strong. Moreover, the 104th Infantry Regiment encountered fierce resistance and was unable to defeat the enemy at the east bank of the Yangjing river. The Chinese Army was evidently not in a state of retreat. On that day, the 13th Division was ordered to send a task force consisting mostly of the 58th Infantry Regiment to Chenzhai (陳宅) to assist the 11th division. The remaining units of the 13th Division began the process of transferring location on October 31. The 159th Division launched a final night assault which failed before retreating to its original position. The next day, except for an artillery battalion and an engineer platoon, the main force of the 13th Division left their hard-fought positions and marched north. The 58th Infantry Regiment attacked Chenzhai with support from artillery and howitzer, but was stubbornly blocked by the 53rd Division and the attack failed. The infantry regiment was ordered to hand over its position to the 11th Division and rejoined the main force. Since then, except for small skirmishes, the Guangfu battlefield had turned into a stalemate until November 12, 1937, when the Chinese withdrew from their positions.

In the battles near Guangfu, the China Expeditionary Army invested a part of the 9th Division and the main force of the 13th Division. The 19th Group Army invested the main force of the 13th and 98th Divisions, approximately one division or four regiments from the 66th Army, and a part of the 9th, 57th, and 90th Divisions. The Japanese 9th Division failed to destroy the Chinese troops in Guangfu and the Japanese 13th Division failed to break through Guangfu, though it tied down 4–5 Chinese divisions. Except for a few forward positions such as Xinmuqiao, Sanjiaqiao, and Laoluzhai, the main positions around Guangfu remained standing until the Chinese withdrawal from Shanghai. From October 2 until October 22, the Chinese 13th Division suffered 1,983 killed and 2,155 wounded, with only 1,260 combat soldiers left including 802 veterans, 188 hospitalized from sickness, and 270 who had recovered from light wounds or sickness. The specific casualties of other Chinese units are unknown.

According to the statistical table of the Japanese 13th Division, the unit suffered 1,782 killed, 3,217 wounded, and 4 missing from October 7 until November 1 and claimed 78 Chinese soldiers captured. According to the battle summary of the division, the unit suffered approximately 1,900 combat and non-combat deaths and approximately 3,900 wounded and claimed its enemy suffering approximately 20,000 casualties including approximately 4,130 abandoned corpses and approximately 40 captured.

== Third Phase (October 27 – November 26) ==
=== Chinese withdrawal from Shanghai city ===
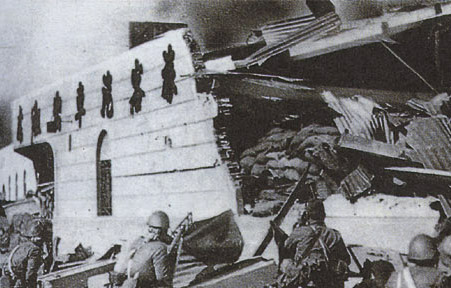
Japanese troops reaching the destroyed North Station in downtown Shanghai

Starting the night of October 26, 1937, the Chinese began withdrawing from Shanghai's urban center. Because Dachang and other vital suburban towns had been lost already, Chiang Kai-shek ordered the Chinese troops to retreat from Zhabei, Jiangwan (江灣), and other positions that the troops had held for seventy-five days without faltering. However, Chiang ordered one battalion of the 88th Division remain in Zhabei to defend the Sihang Warehouse on the northern bank of the Suzhou Creek.

=== Battle of the Sihang Warehouse ===
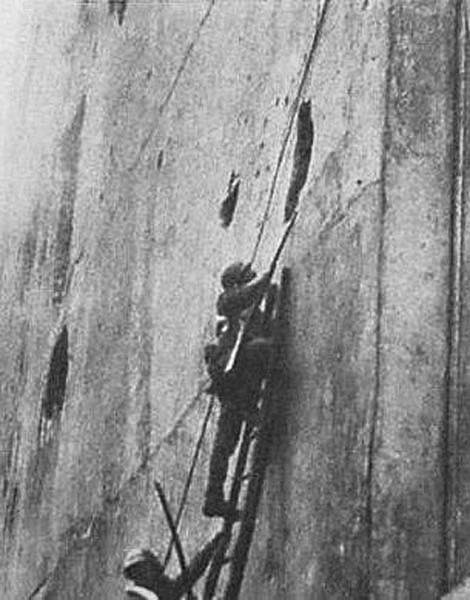
Japanese infantry scale the damaged west wall of the Sihang Warehouse.

Under the leadership of Whampoa Colonel Xie Jinyuan, the 1st Battalion of the 524th Regiment rallied some 411 men and officers to make a stand in the five-story "Four Banks" Warehouse (Sihang Warehouse). The building was situated on the Suzhou Creek across from the International Settlement, and was reinforced with rifle slots, machine gun nests and sandbags.

Between October 27 and November 1, 1937, the 1st Battalion defended Sihang Warehouse against multiple attacks from the Japanese. The warehouse's ten-foot thick walls and proximity to the International Settlement nullified Japanese advantages in firepower, as the Japanese feared accidentally hitting the foreign concessions. As a result, the Chinese managed to beat back several Japanese attacks, which were witnessed by crowds of tens of thousands Westerners and Chinese across the creek. At one point, girl guide Yang Huimin smuggled a Chinese Nationalist flag into the warehouse, which the defenders then raised as a symbol of defiance.

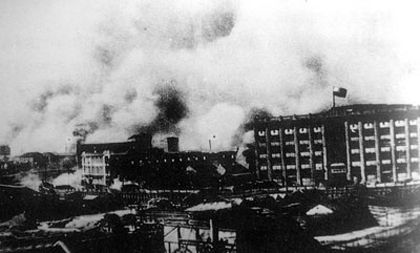
The Chinese flag flying over Sihang Warehouse

Eventually, Chiang ordered the battalion to retreat. Under Japanese artillery and machine gun fire, the Chinese defenders were able to escape into the nearby International Settlement, where they were interned by British authorities. Most of the 1st Battalion survived intact: just over 30 Chinese defenders had been killed in action. According to relevant Japanese materials, the attacking Japanese SNLF forces recorded suffering three fatal casualties among the forty-two wounded during the takeover of Zhabei, including one fatal casualty near Sihang Warehouse. (Note: "閘北進撃戦" - "Assault on Zhabei" covers the Japanese capture of Zhabei on October 27 and the occupation of Sihang Warehouse completed on October 31. The second page lists the following casualties for the entire operation from Oct 27–31: "3 heavily wounded, 24 lightly wounded, and 14 barely wounded." "支那事変尽忠録 第三卷" – "China Incident Loyalty Record: Volume 3," a catalog of all Imperial Japanese Navy personnel killed in action or fatally wounded from the start of the Second Sino-Japanese War until December 11, 1937 has only a single entry relating to fatal casualties around Sihang Warehouse. Page 231 titled "同年十月三十日上海閘北四行倉庫附近ニ於ケル戰傷後死者" – "Same Year [1937] October 30: Those who died of their battle wounds while fighting around the Shanghai Sihang Warehouse" lists Naval Special Duty Ensign [posthumous rank] Tanaka Shiroku (田中士陸). pp. 231–232 further states "Warrant Officer Tanaka was a platoon leader in the Haji Corps, Sunouchi Company, landing at Shanghai on the evening of August 19 and being placed under the Shanghai Special Naval Landing Force Commander's authority." Page 233 continues "Tanaka was heavily wounded by an enemy machine gun round passing through his lower left leg at 6:25 PM [on Oct 30]. He was bandaged at his position and immediately transferred to the hospital for treatment. He temporarily improved in health but by November 2 his condition suddenly worsened and on the same day at 3:30 p.m. he honorably died of his battle wounds.") Colonel Xie initially reported to the newspaper Zhongyang Ribao that his men had killed over 100 Japanese troops before retreating. (Note: The original Zhongyang Ribao (Central Daily) newspaper article quotes Xie Jinyuan as stating "殲敵百餘" – "an excess of 100 of the enemy destroyed.") Military historian Stephen Robinson has claimed the Japanese lost some 200 men in their effort to take the warehouse.

Chiang wanted the Chinese military presence to remain in Shanghai as long as possible to have a positive reflection on the ongoing Nine-Power Treaty Conference that was in session in Brussels, with the hopes for possible intervention from Western powers. The rest of the Chinese troops crossed the Suzhou Creek and regrouped to engage the Japanese troops.

=== Fighting around Suzhou Creek ===
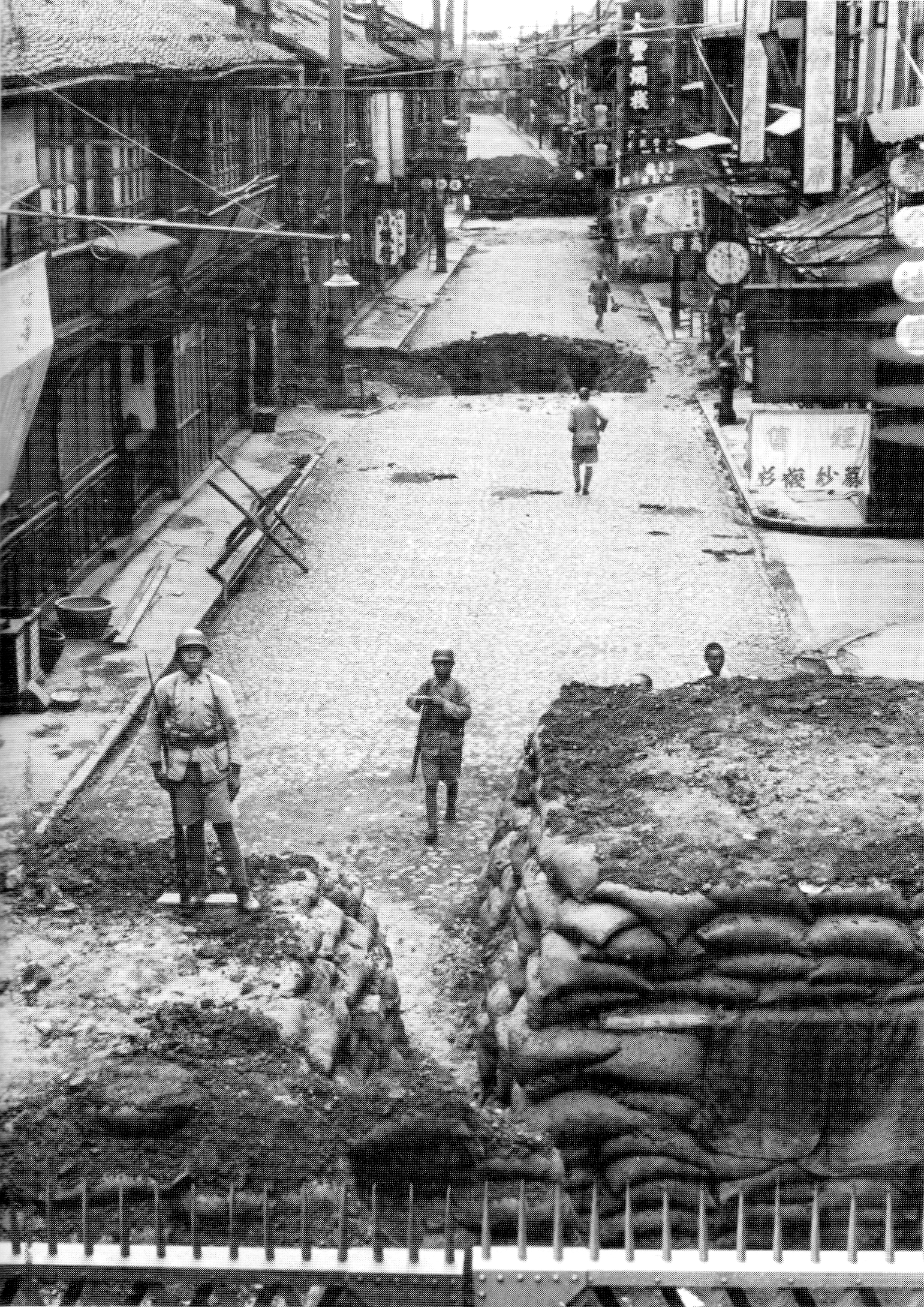
Chinese fortifications near the Shanghai International Settlement, October 1937.

Chiang's original plan was to fight in areas south of the Suzhou Creek and inflict as many Japanese casualties as possible. However, through three months of intense fighting, Chinese troop strength had been greatly reduced. Most units had their strength halved, and as a result a division had the fighting capability of less than two regiments. By now, the Chinese army needed between eight and twelve divisions to match the fighting strength of just one Japanese division. Thus, Chinese commanders were pessimistic about the outcome of the Suzhou Creek combat.

Li Zongren, Bai Chongxi, Zhang Fakui and other commanders insisted that the Chinese troops should enter the Wufu and Xicheng defense lines to protect Nanjing, but Chiang wanted the Chinese troops to continue fighting on the southern bank of Suzhou Creek. On October 28, 1937, Chiang arrived in the battlefield to boost the morale of his troops. However, the situation was bleak. On October 30, the Japanese crossed Suzhou River and the Chinese troops were in danger of encirclement. The Chinese army was at its limit of endurance.

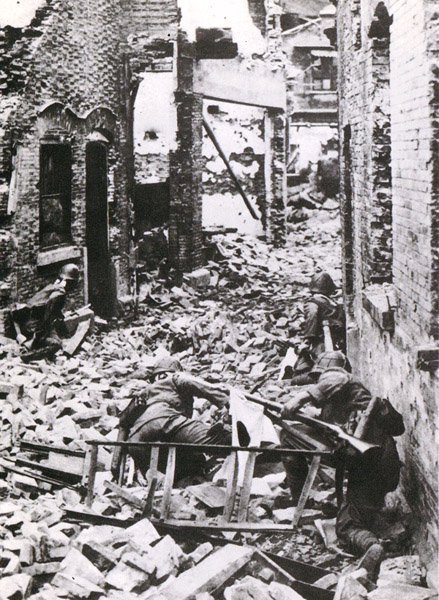
Japanese troops crawling through the ruins

On October 31, the Japanese 3rd Division began landing at the east side of the Suzhou Creek and was blocked by the Chinese 88th Division, Tax Police Corps, and a part of the 36th Division. The next day, the 61st Division and a part of the 87th Division resisted the landing of the Japanese 9th Division at the west side of the creek. On November 2, the 67th Division and the recently arrived 46th Division were ordered to move towards the western defense line of the Suzhou Creek. On November 3 and November 4, 1937, Chinese and Japanese troops at the eastern defense line of the Suzhou Creek were engaged in tug-of-war battles with few gains, during which General Sun Li-jen of the 2nd Task Force of the Tax Police Corps was badly wounded. At the west, the Chinese defenders was unable to block the advance of the 9th Division. The 61st Division quickly suffered more than 3,000 casualties in just several days of fighting and regimental commander Ji Keipei (季苇佩) was killed in action. The 46th Division also suffered heavy casualties, with the losses of two of its regiments exceeding 50% including 3 battalion commanders. On November 5, the 46th Division was replaced by the 154th Division. The 67th Division also suffered heavy casualties and handed over the Qujiaqiao (屈家橋) line to a part of the Training Division while it withdrew.

On the eastern side, the 36th Division faced a massive assault from the Japanese 3rd Division on November 5. One infantry company and one machine gun platoon were completely wiped out under artillery bombardment. The Chinese division repeatedly launched counterattacks as the soldiers desperately held their ground. The 612th Regiment of the Guizhou 102nd Division was put under the command of the 36th Division. Casualties were extremely heavy, with the 212th Regiment reduced to no more than 80 troops. The 36th Division suffered more than 1,200 killed or wounded on that day alone. On November 6, 1937, the 348th Regiment of the 58th Division was also put under the command of the 36th Division. By the end of the day, the 36th Division had suffered an additional more than 600 casualties. Its 211th Regiment had only 60 combat soldiers left and its 216th Regiment had only more than 50 combat soldiers left. On November 7, the Japanese 3rd Division attacked Qujiazhai (趣家宅). The 36th Division and the two attached regiments fought hard but were unable to stop the 3rd Division from occupying the location. On November 8, the Japanese 3rd Division blasted the positions of the 36th Division with artillery. The 215th Regiment was reduced to just over 20 combat soldiers. The 88th Division sent two companies to stabilize the front alongside a part of the 102nd Division. By the end of the day, the defense lines of the 36th Division had been almost completely broken through. During the battle, the 36th Division was supposed to be supplemented with two regiments from the 34th Division. However, more than half of the soldiers took the opportunity to desert after they were bombed by Japanese aircraft while on route to the 36th Division. In the battles along the Suzhou Creek from 27 October until 8 November 1937, the 36th Division suffered 2,511 killed, wounded, or missing and its four regiments had a total of only 860 combat soldiers left even with the additional 1,400 soldiers from the 34th Division.

On the western side, the Japanese 9th Division continued expanding its results. The 105th Division of the Northeastern Army and the Training Division of the Central Army were deployed to block the Japanese division. Gu Huiquan (顧惠全), the commander of the 626th Regiment of the 105th Division, was killed in action while supervising the front-line. The Training Division defended Qujia Bridge and Bazi Bridge against repeated Japanese attacks, and the casualties of the unit quickly reached more than 3,000 after just several days of fighting. Due to the retreat of the Right Wing Force after the Japanese landing at Jinshanwei, the soldiers of the Left Wing Force also began its withdrawal to the Wufu Line.

=== Japanese landings at Jinshanwei ===
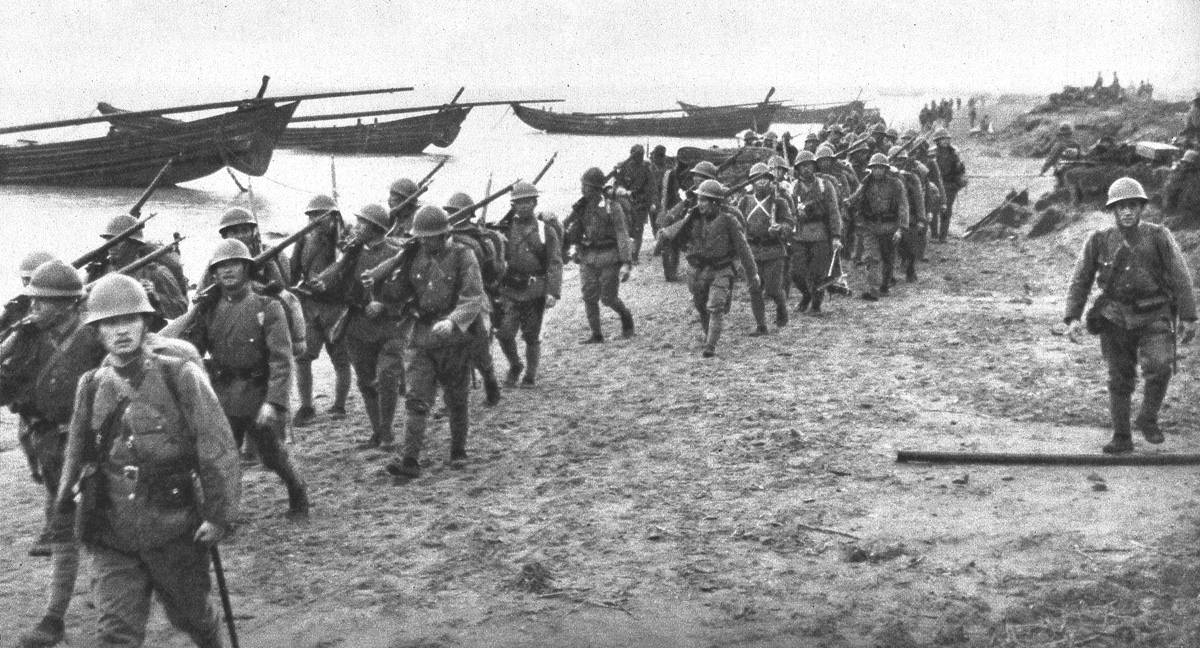
Japanese soldiers land in the Jinshanwei Harbor near Hangzhou

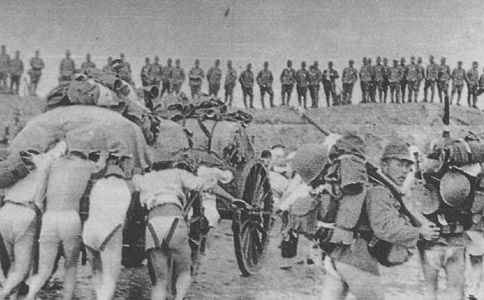
Japanese rear guard units landing supplies in Jinshanwei

As early as October 12, 1937, the Japanese chiefs of staff had already formulated plans to force a landing in Jinshanwei (金山衛), a town located on the northern bank of Hangzhou Bay, south of the Shanghai region. The Jinshanwei landings would facilitate a northward push into Shanghai, to complement the landings in northeastern towns, such as the ones around Baoshan between late August and mid-September, which brought about a southward push.

Chiang Kai-shek was aware of the Japanese plan to encircle his army in Shanghai from the north and the south, and had already ordered his commanders to take precautions of the possible Japanese landings at Jinshanwei. However, the impending fall of Dachang in late October forced Chiang to redeploy the Chinese divisions originally stationed along the northern coast of Hangzhou Bay.

As a result, the lack of Chinese defenses allowed the Japanese 10th Army, composed of units diverted from the Battle of Taiyuan in the North China Theater, to land easily in Jinshanwei on November 5, 1937, as the position was defended by only two companies of the 63rd Division. Jinshanwei was only forty kilometers away from the banks of Suzhou River where the Chinese troops had just retreated from the fall of Dachang.

=== Jiashan County ===
At Jiashan County in Jiaxing 4 regiments and 2 brigades of the 128th Division fought to defend the are against Japan for a week. The division was from Fenghuang County in western Hunan and had many ethnic minorities like Tujia people and Miao people and during the Qing dynasty it was called the Gan army (竿軍). Many of them were armed with traditional weapons like the short Miao sabre.

== Road to Nanjing ==
=== Decision to take Nanjing ===
In October, the SEF was reinforced by the Japanese 10th Army commanded by Lieutenant General Heisuke Yanagawa. On 7 November, Japanese Central China Area Army (CCAA) was organized by combining the SEF and the 10th Army, with Matsui appointed as its commander-in-chief concurrently with that of the SEF. After winning the battles around Shanghai, the SEF suggested the Imperial General Headquarters in Tokyo to attack Nanking.

The CCAA was rearranged and Lieutenant General Prince Asaka (Yasuhiko), an uncle of Emperor Hirohito, was appointed as the commander of the SEF, while Matsui stayed as the commander of CCAA overseeing both the SEF and the 10th Army. The real nature of Matsui's authority is however difficult to establish as he was confronted with a member of the imperial family directly appointed by the Emperor. In anticipation of the attack on Nanking, Matsui issued orders to his armies that read:

Nanjing is the capital of China and the capture thereof is an international affair; therefore, careful study should be made so as to exhibit the honor and glory of Japan and augment the trust of the Chinese people, and that the battle in the vicinity of Shanghai is aimed at the subjugation of the Chinese Army, therefore protect and patronize Chinese officials and people, as far as possible; the Army should always bear in mind not to involve foreign residents and armies in trouble and maintain close liaison with foreign authorities in order to avoid misunderstandings.

On December 2, Emperor Showa nominated one of his uncles, Prince Asaka, as commander of the invasion. It is difficult to establish if, as a member of the imperial family, Asaka had a superior status to general Iwane Matsui, who was officially the commander in chief, but it is clear that, as the top-ranking officer, he had authority over division commanders, lieutenant-generals Kesago Nakajima and Heisuke Yanagawa.

=== Japanese advance toward Nanjing ===
After securing control of Shanghai, the Japanese army began its advance towards Nanjing on November 11, 1937, approaching the city from different directions.

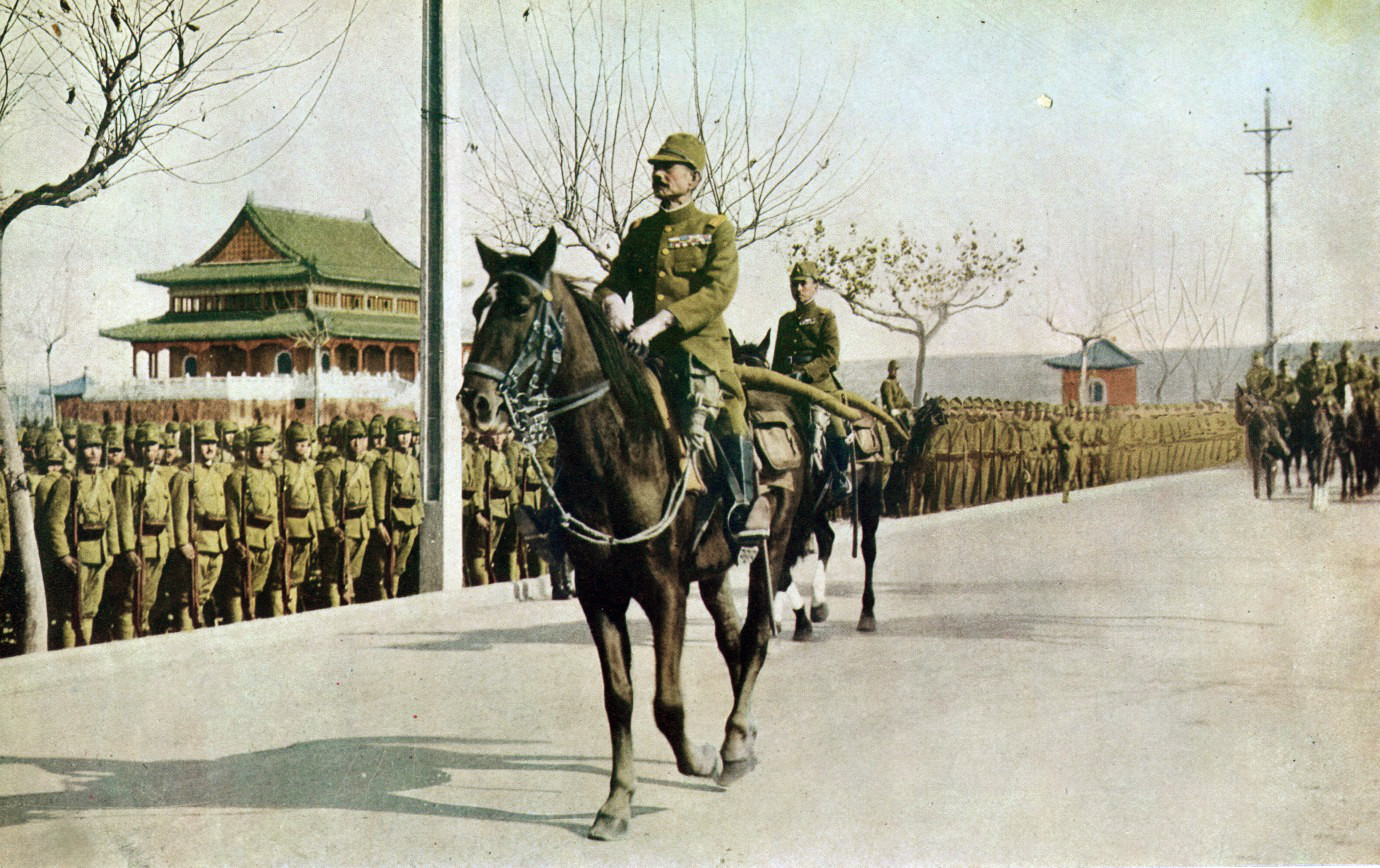
Iwane Matsui riding into Nanjing on December 17, 1937

The Japanese advance to Nanjing can be characterized as a "forced march". Almost all units covered the distance of almost 400 kilometers in about a month. Assuming that capture of the Chinese capital would be the decisive turning point in the war, there was an eagerness to be among the first to claim the honor of victory.

The Japanese army was engaged by Chinese soldiers on a number of occasions on the way to Nanjing. As a general rule, they were heavily outnumbered. As the Japanese came closer to Nanjing, the fighting grew in both frequency and severity.

=== Chinese retreat from Shanghai ===
Japanese landings at Jinshanwei meant that the Chinese army had to retire from the Shanghai front and attempt a breakout. However, Chiang Kai-shek still placed some hope that the Nine-Power Treaty would result in a sanction against Japan by Western powers. It was not until November 8 that the Chinese central command issued a general retreat to withdraw from the entire Shanghai front. A regiment of the 55th Division alongside the Shanghai Police Force and Peace Preservation Corps were ordered to defend Nanshi. After three days of fighting, the remaining more than 3,000 policemen, soldiers, and peace preservation troops retreated to the French Concession on November 11 and were interned. The 67th Army and 43rd Army were ordered to hold Songjiang for 3 days to cover the retreat of the rest of the army. All other Chinese units were ordered to move toward western towns such as Kunshan, and then from there enter the final defense lines to stop the Japanese from reaching Nanjing.

By then, the Chinese army was utterly exhausted, and with a severe shortage of ammunition and supplies, the defense was faltering. In Songjiang, the 67th Army and 43rd Army had already been exhausted from previous battles and had not fully recovered their losses. The 67th Army of the Northeastern Army was originally deployed in the North China front to fight in the Beiping–Hankou Railway Operation and the Tianjin–Pukou Railway Operation. From September 10 until October 10, 1937, the 67th Army suffered casualties exceeding 6,000 and the two divisions under the army had just over 5,000 combat soldiers left. Due to deteriorating situation in the Shanghai battlefield, the 67th Army was ordered to move south and only reached Songjiang at the night of November 6. The 20th Army and 43rd Army of the Sichuan Army arrived in the Shanghai battlefield alongside the 21st Group Army of the Guangxi Army on October 14. The 43rd Army, consisting of only the 26th Division, fought north of Dachang from October 17 until October 23. By the time the unit handed over its defense position to the 18th Division and withdrew to Qingpu for rest, there were only just over a hundred combat soldiers left.

In early November the 43rd Army was ordered to defend Songjiang with the 67th Army. Seven companies under battalion commander Liu Zhangnan (劉長柟) was put under the command of the 107th Division. On November 8, 1937, the Japanese 6th Division left behind the Kunizaki Task Force attached to the division to attack Songjiang while the division rushed towards Qingpu. By the 9th, Songjiang had fallen and army commander Wu Keren ordered his troops to break out towards Kunshan in the evening. Unfortunately, they encountered a portion of the 47th Infantry Regiment of the Japanese 6th Division at the slope of Sheshan and were scattered. General Wu was killed while he was directing what remained of his troops to cross the river.

Army commander Wu Keren (吳克仁), chief of staff of the army Wu Tonggang (吳桐崗), chief of staff of the 107th Division Deng Yuzhou (鄧玉琢), brigade commanders Zhu Zhirong (朱之榮) and Liu Qiwen (劉啟文), and 3 regimental commanders were killed in action. The casualties of the 67th Army reached seventy to eighty percent. Most of the seven companies of the 43rd Army were lost in Songjiang, with the army taking in only more than 300 survivors by December 17. The Kunizaki Task Force claimed to have killed about 2,000 soldiers of the 107th and 108th Divisions in Songjiang and captured 5,286 while suffering 24 killed and 103 wounded. The task force marched east and attacked Beiqiao Town (北橋鎮), claiming to have killed at least 2,000 soldiers and captured 733 from the 45th Separate Brigade and possibly remnants of the 67th and 43rd Armies that managed to break out of Songjiang (Note: The task force claimed that the enemies in Beiqiao Town were the 132nd Division of the 29th Army and the 45th Separate Brigade, but the 132nd Division was still in North China at the time.) while suffering only 6 killed and 11 wounded. Ikuhiko Hata believed that since what happened to the POWs after their capture is unknown, many of the prisoners might have been killed. In total, the 26th Division suffered 3,846 killed and 1,812 wounded in the battles of Dachang and Songjiang.

On November 9, 1937, Japanese planes bombed the retreating Right Wing Force all day long, causing heavy casualties. The bombings cause damages on the bridges over the Suzhou River and divisions compete to cross the river first. On November 11, the Japanese 6th Division engaged in fierce fighting with the 51st and 58th Divisions of the Chinese 74th Army at Qingpu. The commander of the 147th Brigade of the 58th Division, Wu Jiguang (吳繼光), was killed in action. On November 12, the 74th Army retreated to Kunshan, the 51st division having suffered more than 2,800 casualties. In the battles of Songjiang and Qingpu, the 6th Division and the Kunizaki Task Force suffered 121 killed and 377 wounded while claiming approximately 10,500 abandoned enemy corpses. Kunshan was lost in only two days, and the remaining troops began moving toward the Wufu Line fortifications on November 13. The Chinese army was fighting with the last of its strength and the frontline was on the verge of collapse.

In the chaos that ensued many Chinese units were broken up and lost contact with their communications officers who had the maps and layouts to the fortifications. In addition, once they arrived at Wufu Line, the Chinese troops discovered that some of the civilian officials were not there to receive them as they had already fled and had taken the keys with them. The battered Chinese troops, who had just emerged from the bloodbath in Shanghai and were hoping to enter the defense lines, found that they were not able to utilize these fortifications.

The Wufu Line was penetrated on November 19, 1937, and the Chinese troops then moved toward Xicheng Line, which they were forced to give up on November 26 in the midst of the onslaught. The "Chinese Hindenburg Line", which the government had spent millions to construct and was the final line of defense between Shanghai and Nanjing, collapsed in only two weeks. The Battle of Shanghai was over. However, fighting continued without a pause on the road to China's capital and the ensuing combat immediately led into the Battle of Nanjing.

By early December, Japanese troops had reached the outskirts of Nanking.

After its success in the Battle of Shanghai, Japan did not immediately occupy the Shanghai International Settlement or the Shanghai French Concession, areas which were outside of China's control due to the treaty port system. Japan moved into these areas after its 1941 declaration of war against the United States and the United Kingdom. It seized most of the banks in these areas of Shanghai and declared that the Nationalist currency fabi had to be exchanged for bank notes of the Wang Jingwei regime.

== Casualties ==
The battle saw both sides suffer an enormous amount of casualties, especially the Chinese forces, who had inferior armaments as compared to the Japanese. A Chinese historian at the time stated that it was "the bloodiest battle... since Verdun." There are differing estimates and reports of the number of casualties each side suffered.

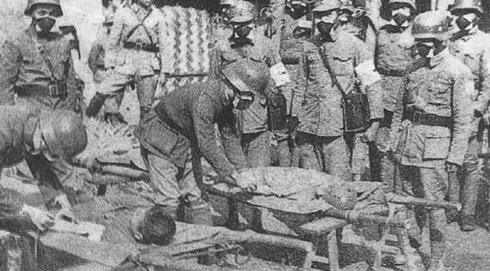
Chinese treating casualties from Japanese gas attacks

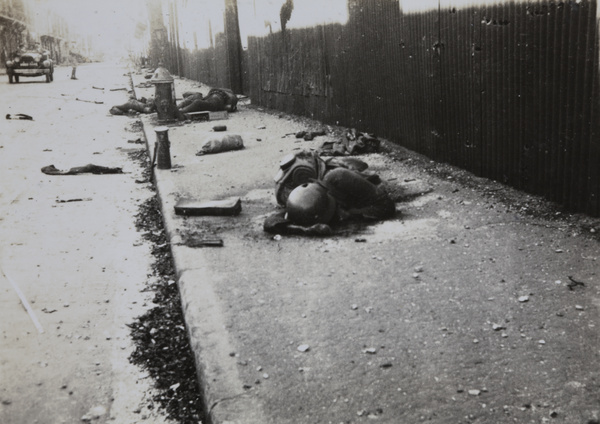
Chinese soldiers killed in downtown Shanghai

According to historians Peter Harmsen, Rana Mitter and Richard Frank, China suffered 187,200 killed and wounded defending the city per an official Chinese report on November 5. Contemporary Japanese estimates for Chinese military casualties were roughly 250,000 including some 67,000 killed. Frank Dorn, an American military officer stationed in China at the time, put total Chinese casualties for the entire Shanghai campaign (including the retreat) at 240,000 casualties, of which 130,000 were suffered before October 20. Hsi-Sheng Chi stated that China suffered some 300,000 casualties during the battle. The high Chinese casualties were due to a combination of factors, including tactical reliance on costly frontal assaults, Japanese superiorities in airpower and naval artillery, poor medical services, and the near-fanatical resistance of Chinese defenders who were willing to fight to the death on numerous occasions.

The Ministry of Military Affairs in 1938 counted 229,382 casualties from August 13 until November 15. As many units of the Sichuan and Guangxi armies had not yet reported their losses, total casualties were estimated at 300,000. However, the same Ministry of Military Affairs on June 30, 1939 recorded the casualties of the Third War Zone from the Marco Polo Bridge Incident to the fall of Nanjing as 3,823 officers and 72,637 soldiers killed and 7,646 officers and 145,276 soldiers wounded, totalling 229,382 casualties which was the exact figure of losses as the incomplete statistics of casualties reported earlier by the ministry for the battle of Shanghai only. This data was used by the ministry for later yearly reports on casualties.

The Japanese claimed their casualties in the Shanghai campaign amounted to 9,115 killed and 31,257 injured. Historian Peter Harmsen notes that this figure is possibly understated, as Iwane Matsui had recorded in his diary that his forces had sustained over 18,000 deaths to combat and disease in the Shanghai-Nanjing Campaign. Historian Richard Frank agrees, and states the official Japanese figures fail to convey the extent of their losses sustained during the campaign, especially the four most heavily engaged divisions such as the 9th division, which suffered a 94% casualty rate. According to official Japanese military records compiled by Ikuhiko Hata, the five divisions most involved in combat (3rd, 9th, 11th, 13th, 101st) suffered 42,202 casualties including 11,072 killed in action, although this number doesn't include losses from the Special Naval Landing Forces or any of the divisions deployed in October. The army ministry recorded the casualties of the 9th Division in the battle of Shanghai and battle of Nanjing at 4,357 killed (including deaths from wounds) and 9,690 wounded, of which 12,000 casualties or 3,833 killed and 8,527 wounded occurred in the Battle of Shanghai near Guangfu and the Suzhou River from October 2 until November 7.

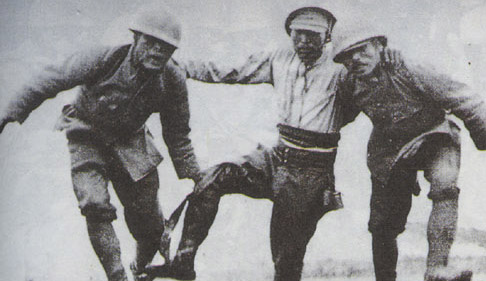
A Japanese casualty is evacuated during fighting at the Suzhou Creek.

Chinese wartime records indicate that the Japanese suffered over 60,000 casualties in the three months of combat around Shanghai. Jonathan Fenby provides a similar number, claiming the Japanese suffered some 70,000 casualties in the battle. Benjamin Lai provides higher figures, estimating the Japanese suffered a total of 93,000 to 99,000 casualties, including 17,000 combat deaths plus about 1,800 illness-induced deaths, making a total of almost 19,000 deaths, with another 35,000–40,000 wounded and 40,000 sick, while the Chinese suffered 270,700 casualties including 187,200 killed and 83,500 wounded, for a combined total of 363,700 to 369,700 casualties. According to research done by James Paulose, the Japanese suffered 92,640 casualties and the Chinese suffered over 333,500 casualties based on the memoir of He Yingqin, for a combined total of at least 426,140 casualties.

== Atrocities ==
Numerous atrocities were committed during the Shanghai Campaign, especially by the Japanese forces.

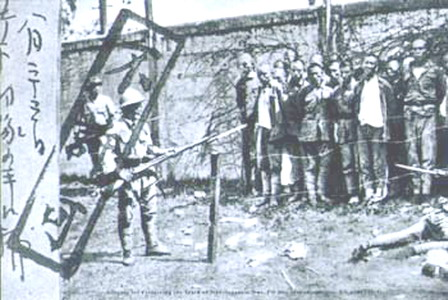
Captured Chinese soldiers on August 23, 1937. The seal on the left, placed by the Japanese Censorship Bureau, reads "not permitted". There is a dead prisoner in the lower right hand corner.

Japanese troops rarely took prisoners, if ever. Captives, including civilians accused of spying, were interrogated and disposed of once they had no more information to offer. According to Iwane Matsui's diary, every single one of the 500 Chinese POWs captured around Wusong was shot. Executions were typically conducted by decapitation with swords, but it was not uncommon for more gruesome methods to be used: injured Chinese prisoners were often tied together face-down, doused in gasoline, and then burned alive.

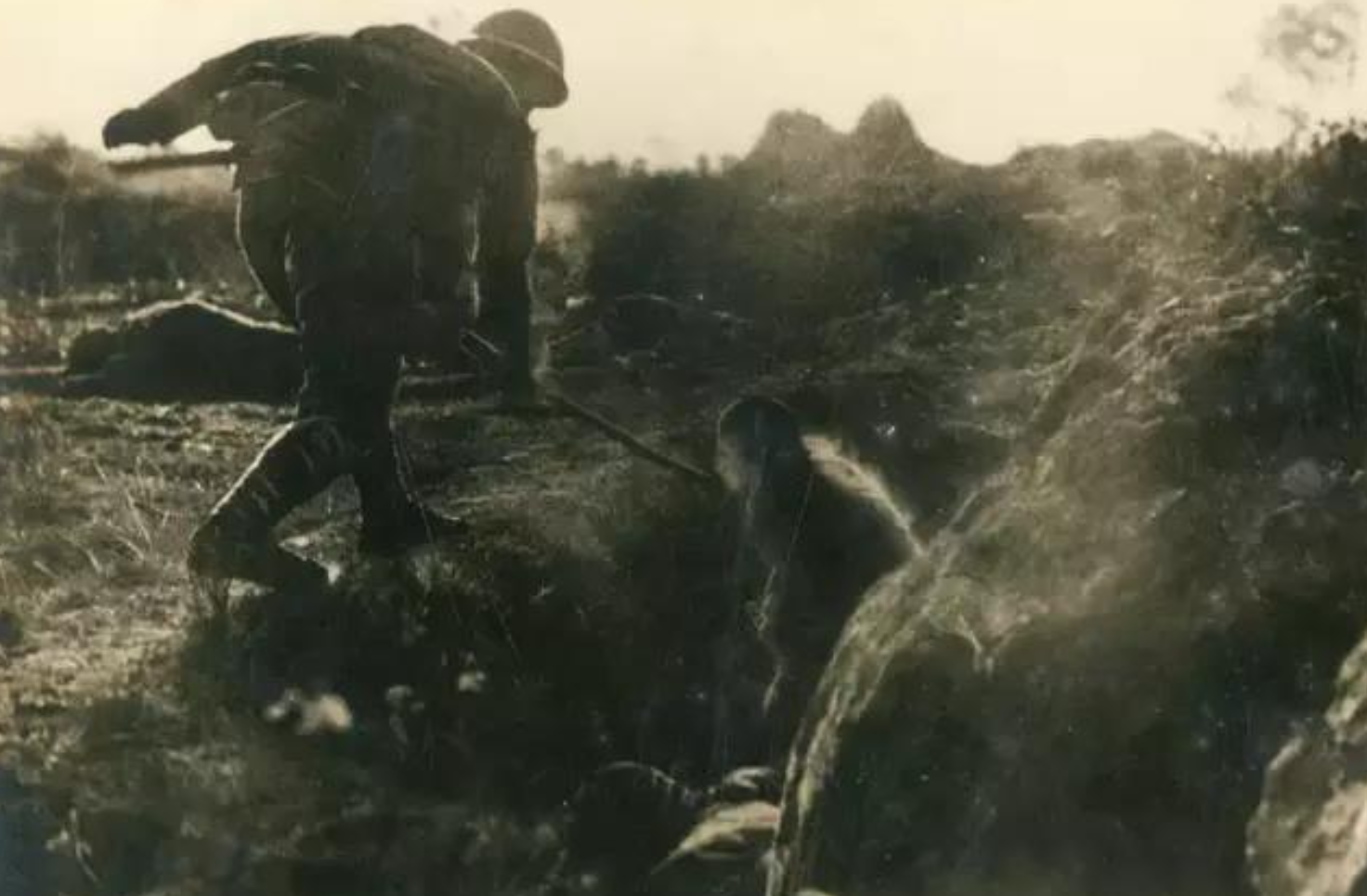
A Japanese soldier executes a Chinese prisoner by cutting his throat. Several more bodies are visible. Late October, 1937.

Civilians and non-combatants were also targeted. For example, the Japanese machine gunned crowds of refugees by the Jessfield Railway Bridge, and deliberately strafed refugee columns near Brenan road. To compensate for supply shortages, Japanese troops often looted from local towns and villages, frequently massacring their civilian inhabitants in the process. Japanese aircraft deliberately targeted anything that bore the Red Cross, frequently strafing or bombing ambulances transporting wounded Chinese soldiers, civilians and medical personnel.

On the other hand, the Chinese implemented scorched earth tactics to deny Japanese forces local resources. This meant burning buildings and fields, destroying harvests, killing animals and poisoning wells, causing massive property damage to Shanghai.

== Aftermath ==
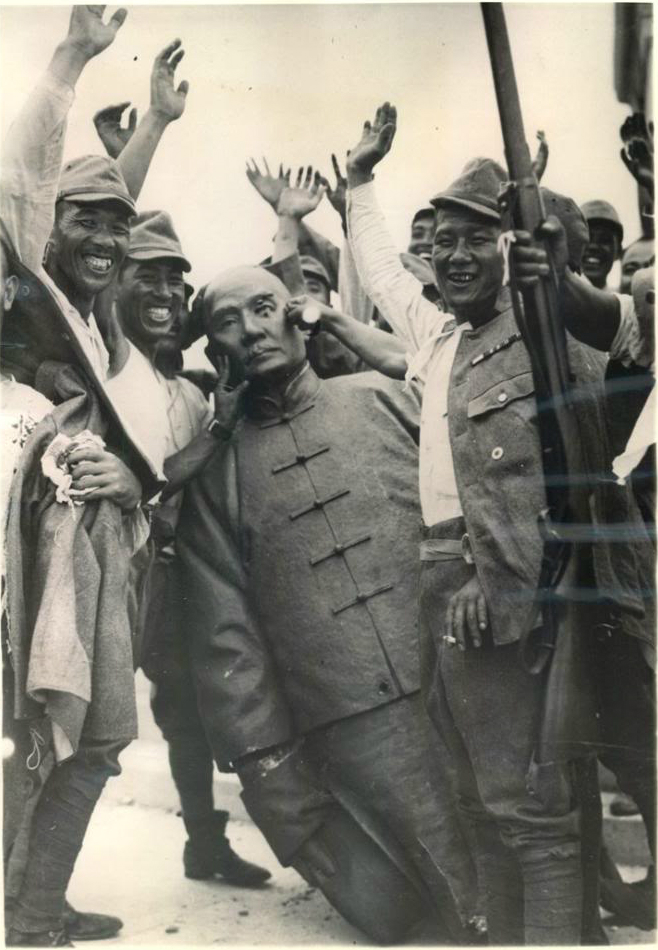
Japanese soldiers pose next to a toppled bronze statue of Sun Yat-sen after capturing Shanghai.

=== Loss of Central Army military strength ===
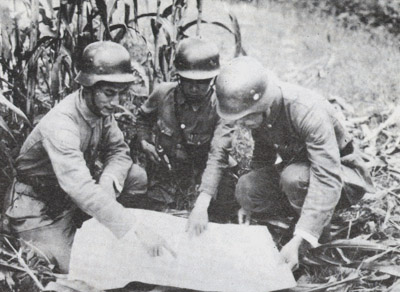
China's officer corps took a particularly strong hit in the battle.

Even though the Battle of Shanghai was only the first of the twenty-two major battles fought between China and Japan, Chiang Kai-shek's decision to send his best troops into the battle had significant repercussions. At the outbreak of the war, the Chinese NRA boasted a standing army of some 1.75 million troops, but the combat strength was significantly lower as the majority of the Chinese troops were poorly trained and poorly equipped. Only about 300,000 were comparatively better trained. These troops were reorganized into some 20 newly formed divisions. Of these, around 80,000 had belonged to the German-trained divisions that composed the elite units of Chiang Kai-shek's Central Army. However, even these divisions were not sufficiently supported by combined arms or modern logistics. Thus, out of a grand total of almost two million men-in-arms, less than one hundred thousand Chinese troops were able to fight Japan on more or less equal terms.

Chiang Kai-shek's decision to commit his elite divisions to fight in Shanghai caused his elite units to suffer some sixty percent disproportionate casualties. In one single blow, Chiang also lost some 10,000 of the 25,000 junior officers trained by the Whampoa Military Academy between 1929 and 1937, in addition to some tens of thousands of potential military officers. Chiang Kai-shek's Central Army was never to recover from these devastating losses. By the time the 88th Division, arguably the best of these elite divisions, began its defense of Nanjing, it had been reduced to seven thousand men, of whom three thousand were new recruits to replace the losses.

Losses to the Nationalist army's very small stock of armor were also significant. The Chinese deployed three tank battalions in the battle and its immediate aftermath. The 1st Battalion had 32 VCL Amphibious Tanks and some 6-ton Vickers Mark E tanks. The 2nd Battalion also in Shanghai had 20 Vickers Mark E tanks, 4 VCL Tanks and Carden Loyd tankettes. The 3rd Battalion had 10 Panzer I light tanks, 20 CV35 tankettes, and some Leichter Panzerspähwagen armored cars. Almost all of these were lost during the battles in Shanghai and later on in Nanjing.

The heavy casualties inflicted on Chiang's own military strength forced him to rely more on non-Whampoa generals, who commanded the provincial armies and many of whom had questionable loyalty to Chiang. Because of the reduction in his military power, Chiang lost some of his political leverage over local warlords. In effect, Chiang Kai-shek was effectively only the head of a loose coalition, rather than the commander-in-chief of a united fighting force. The sapping of China's best fighting men also made the planning and execution of subsequent military operations difficult. In essence, Chiang Kai-shek's concerted pre-war effort to build a truly effective, modernized, national army was greatly devastated by the sacrifices made in the Battle of Shanghai.

== See also ==
- Events preceding World War II in Asia
  - Jinan incident (May 1928)
  - Huanggutun incident (Japanese assassination of the Chinese head of state Generalissimo Zhang Zuolin on June 4, 1928)
- Second Sino-Japanese War
  - Japanese invasion of Manchuria
    - Mukden Incident (September 18, 1931)
  - January 28 Incident (Shanghai, 1932)
  - Defense of the Great Wall (1933)
  - Marco Polo Bridge Incident (July 7, 1937)
- Assassination of Tomomitsu Taminato (1936)
- Great Way Government (Shanghai, 1937–1938)
- Shanghai Ghetto
- Defense of Sihang Warehouse
