= Fengjing (disambiguation) =

Fengjing ( 枫泾) is a town in Jinshan District, Shanghai.

Fengjing may also refer to:

== Places ==
- Fengjing (Zhou) (灃京), part of Fenghao, the ancient capital of the Duchy of Zhou
- Fengjing, Anhui (冯井), a town in Huoqiu County, Lu'an, Anhui

== Other ==
- Fengjing pig
