= Puhang Road station =

Shanghai Metro station

Puhang Road 浦航路
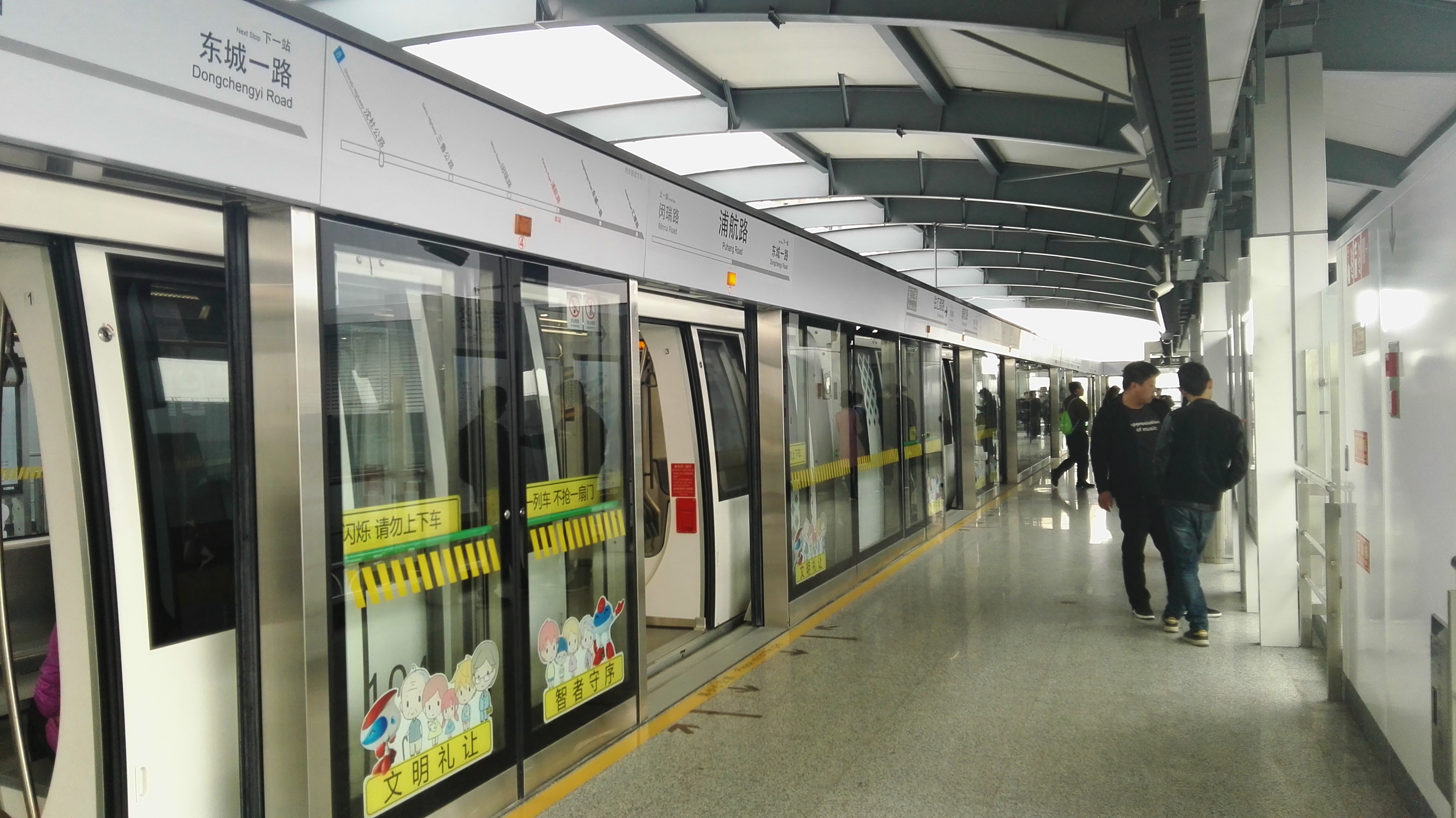
- Station platform, Huizhen Road-bound side

General information
- Location: Sanlu Highway at Puhang Road; Minhang District, Shanghai; China
- Coordinates: 31.043175°N 121.526285°E
- Operated by: Shanghai Keolis Public Transport Operation Management Co. Ltd.
- Line: Pujiang Line
- Platforms: 2 (2 side platforms)
- Tracks: 2

Construction
- Structure type: Elevated
- Accessible: Yes

History
- Opened: March 31, 2018

Services
Preceding station	Shanghai Metro	Following station
Minrui Road towards Shendu Highway	Pujiang Line	Dongchengyi Road towards Huizhen Road
Location

Puhang Road (Chinese: 浦航路; pinyin: Pǔháng Lù) is a station on the Pujiang line of the Shanghai Metro. The station is located just north of the intersection of Sanlu Highway and Puhang Road, between Minrui Road and Dongchengyi Road. It began passenger trial operations with the rest of the Pujiang line on March 31, 2018.
