= Minrui Road station =

Shanghai Metro station

Minrui Road 闵瑞路
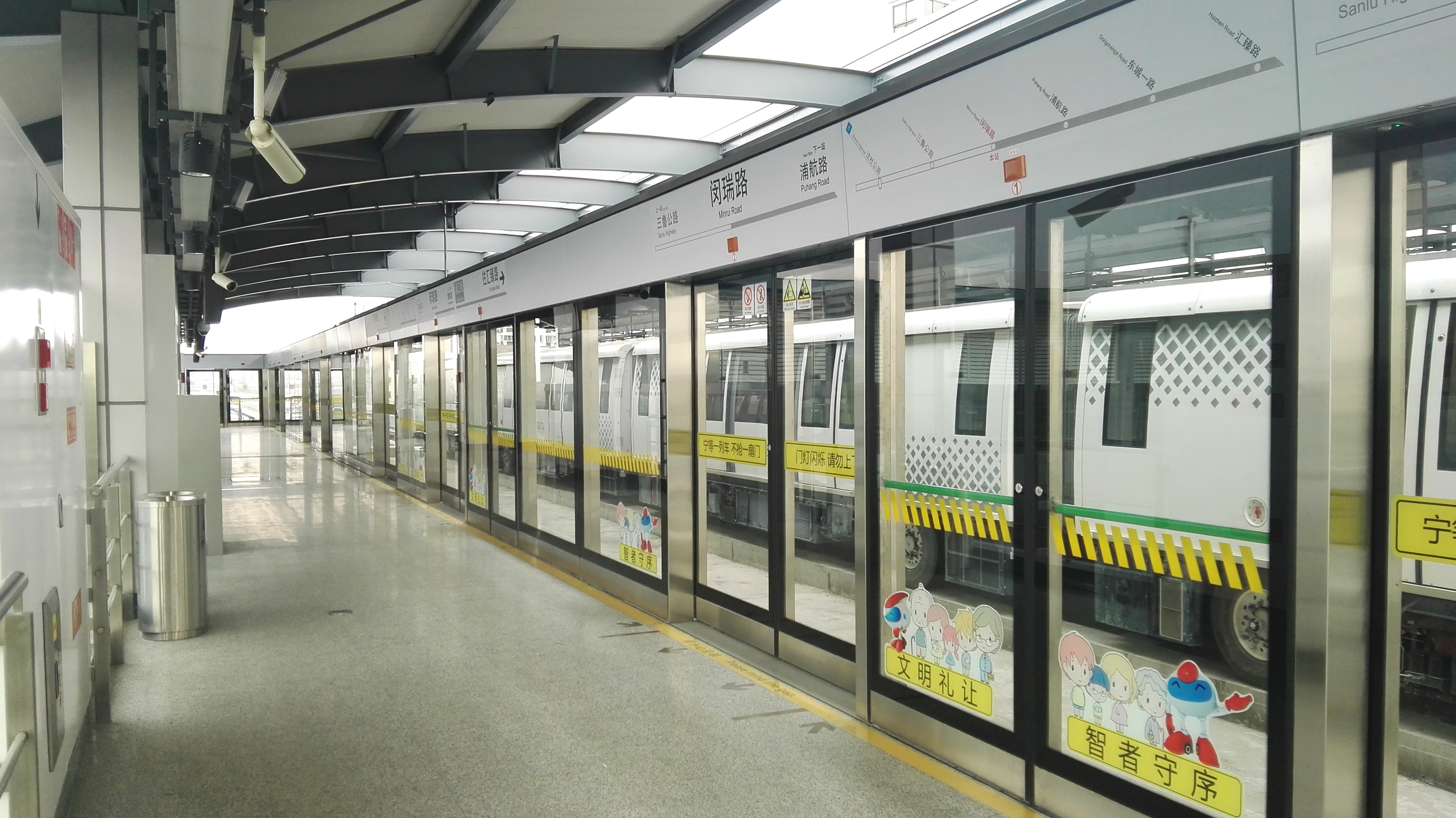
- Station platform, Huizhen Road-bound side

General information
- Location: Sanlu Highway at Minrui Road; Minhang District, Shanghai; China
- Coordinates: 31.050295°N 121.525983°E
- Operated by: Shanghai Keolis Public Transport Operation Management Co. Ltd.
- Line: Pujiang Line
- Platforms: 2 (2 side platforms)
- Tracks: 2

Construction
- Structure type: Elevated
- Accessible: Yes

History
- Opened: March 31, 2018

Services
Preceding station	Shanghai Metro	Following station
Sanlu Highway towards Shendu Highway	Pujiang Line	Puhang Road towards Huizhen Road
Location

Minrui Road (simplified Chinese: 闵瑞路; traditional Chinese: 閔瑞路; pinyin: Mǐnruì Lù) is a station on the Pujiang line of the Shanghai Metro. The station is located at the intersection of Minrui Road and Sanlu Highway, between Sanlu Highway and Puhang Road. It began passenger trial operations with the rest of the Pujiang line on March 31, 2018.
