= Gaoqiao, Shanghai =

Town in Shanghai, China

Coordinates: 31.355°N 121.57°E

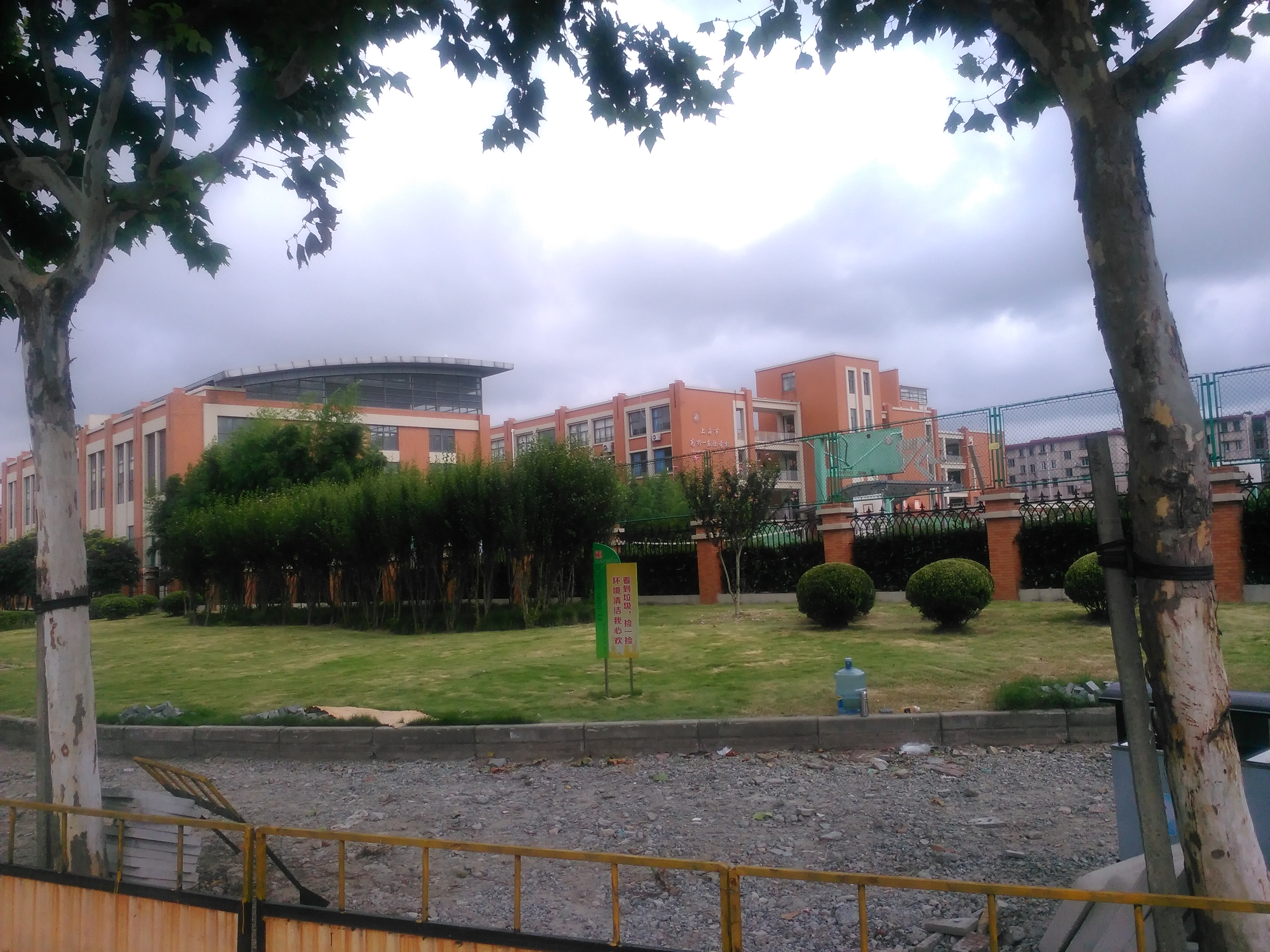
Dong Lu School of Shanghai Gaoqiao

Gaoqiao (Chinese: 高桥; pinyin: Gāoqiáo) is a town in Pudong New Area in Shanghai, China. Gaoqiao Old Town dates back to the Southern Song dynasty. Gaoqiao New Town, also known as Holland Village or Holland Town, is a new town with a Dutch architectural theme.

Gaoqiao is located at the northern end of Pudong, on the east bank of the Huangpu River and next to Waigaoqiao Free Trade Zone. It has an area of 39 square kilometres, and had a registered population of 84,900 in 2008. The town is served by Shanghai Metro Line 6.

Gaoqiao New Town arose from the One City, Nine Towns policy, which was initiated in 2001. Each of the suburban districts of Shanghai was assigned a new town, each with its own theme. Pudong's new town was assigned to Gaoqiao, with a Dutch theme. Other Western themes used to date are Scandinavian, Italian, Spanish, Canadian, English and German. Dutch architectural firms Kuiper Compagnons and Atelier Dutch jointly produced the design for the town's initial development, covering an area of 1 square kilometre; Chinese designers were brought in subsequently. There are versions of Dutch buildings such as the Netherlands Maritime Museum, the Bijenkorf department store in Amsterdam, and the Hofwijck mansion in Voorburg. One section of the town was inspired by the Kattenbroek quarter of Amersfoort. The town also has a windmill, and is a popular location for wedding photography. As of July 2010, the town was still only partially built.

Binjiang Forest Park is located at the northern tip of Gaoqiao, close to Sancha Port. Phase 1 of the park, with 1.2 square kilometres of the planned total of 3 square kilometres, was opened in 2007.

== Education ==
Shanghai Gaoqiao-Dong Lu School (上海市高桥 — 东陆学校) serves the area. Gaoqiao Town Primary School(高桥镇小学) Tonggang Primary School(潼港小学) Gaoqiao Middle School(高桥初中)

== See also ==
- PLA Unit 61398
