= Pujiang =

Pujiang may refer to the following in China:

- Pujiang County, Sichuan (蒲江县), county of Chengdu
- Pujiang County, Zhejiang (浦江县), county of Jinhua
- Huangpu River, also called Pujiang, the main river of Shanghai
- Pujiang, Shanghai (浦江镇), a town in Minhang District
- Pujiang Town station (浦江镇站), station on Shanghai Metro Line 8
- Pujiang line (浦江线), a Shanghai Metro line in Pujiang town
