= Fengpu Express =

Bus rapid transit in Shanghai, China

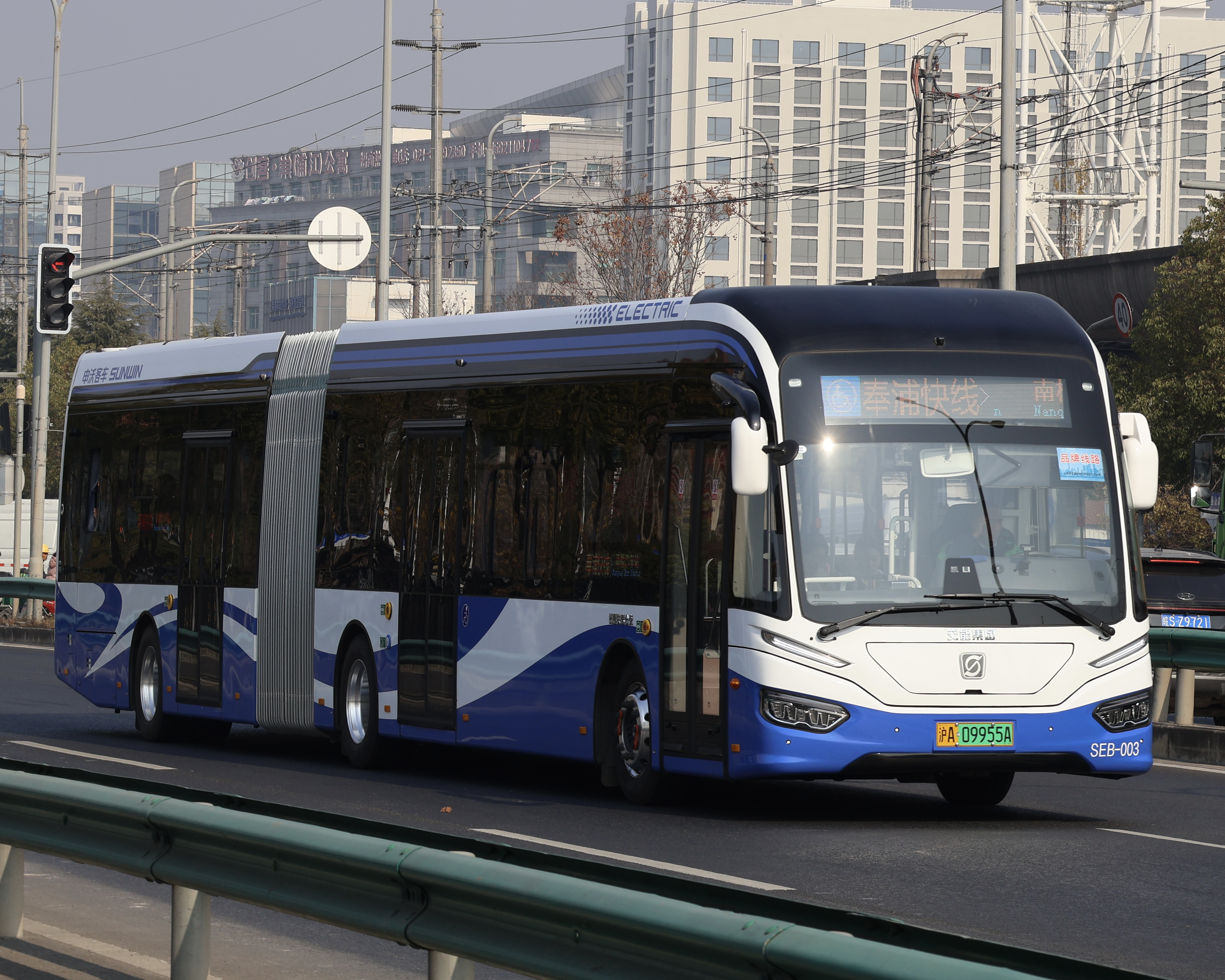
- A Sunwin iEV18 shortly after departing the Shendu Highway stop in December 2025

Overview
- Operator: Shanghai Xiantong BRT Co. Ltd
- Began service: 20 April 2018

Route
- Route type: Bus rapid transit
- Start: Nanqiao Bus Station
- Via: Nanfeng Highway, Xianpu Road, Puxing Highway
- End: Shendu Highway station
- Length: 20.3km
- Stations: 13

Service
- Frequency: 10 minutes
- Daily ridership: 10000 (2023)

The Fengpu Express (Chinese: 奉浦快线; pinyin: Fèng pǔ kuài xiàn) is a bus rapid transit line located in Shanghai, China. It operates between Nanqiao Bus Station in Fengxian District and Shendu Highway station in Pudong District, and is operated by Shanghai Xiantong BRT Co. Ltd (贤通快速公交建设有限公司). It is the first BRT line to run in Shanghai.

== History ==
In 2012, the government of Fengxian District announced in their annual report that the district is willing to take up the task of construction of Shanghai's first BRT line. Bidding for construction of different parts of the route started in 2013.

On 20 April 2018, the route was partially opened between Nanqiao Bus Station and Shendu Highway station, with a total of 12 stops.

On 20 April 2019, on the 1st anniversary of the opening of the line, Jinhui station opened as an infill station along Puxing Highway, between Nanhanggang Road and Lunan Road stations.

As of 2021, there are plans to extend the Fengpu Express Line to Oriental Sports Center station, in order to relieve congestion on Line 8.

== Stations ==
As of May 2023, Fengpu Express stops at 13 stations along Nanfeng Highway, Xianpu Road and Puxing Highway, with a total route length of 20.3 km. Travelling from one terminus to another takes approximately 45 minutes.

Below is the list of stations at which the Fengpu Express Line stops at:

Station Name English	Station Name Chinese	Transfer	Notes
Nanqiao Bus Station	南桥汽车站	Nantuan Express Line	Shares BRT platform with Nantuan Express Line
Wangyuan Road	望园路	Nantuan Express Line	Shares BRT platform with Nantuan Express Line
Jinhai Highway	金海公路	Nantuan Express Line	Shares BRT platform with Nantuan Express Line
Dingkang Road	定康路	Nantuan Express Line	Shares BRT platform with Nantuan Express Line
Xianpu Road	贤浦路		
Xiuzhu Road	秀竹路		
Qinglang Road	清朗路		
Jinda Highway	金大公路		
Qixian	齐贤		
Nanhanggang Road	南行港路		
Jinhui	金汇		Opened on 20 April 2019
Lunan Road	鲁南路		
Shendu Highway	沈杜公路	8 Pujiang (Shendu Highway station)	

== Fleet ==
As of May 2023, the fleet of buses running on the Fengpu Express consists of 25 Sunwin SWB6128BEV23 rigid buses and 10 Sunwin SWB6188BEV21 articulated buses, all of which run on battery power. Buses provide free Wi-Fi and USB chargers onboard, are fitted with seatbelts, and all buses are wheelchair accessible. Rigid buses have a capacity of 90 passengers, while articulated buses can carry a maximum of 150 people.
