= Jiangyue Road station =

Shanghai Metro station

Jiangyue Road 江月路
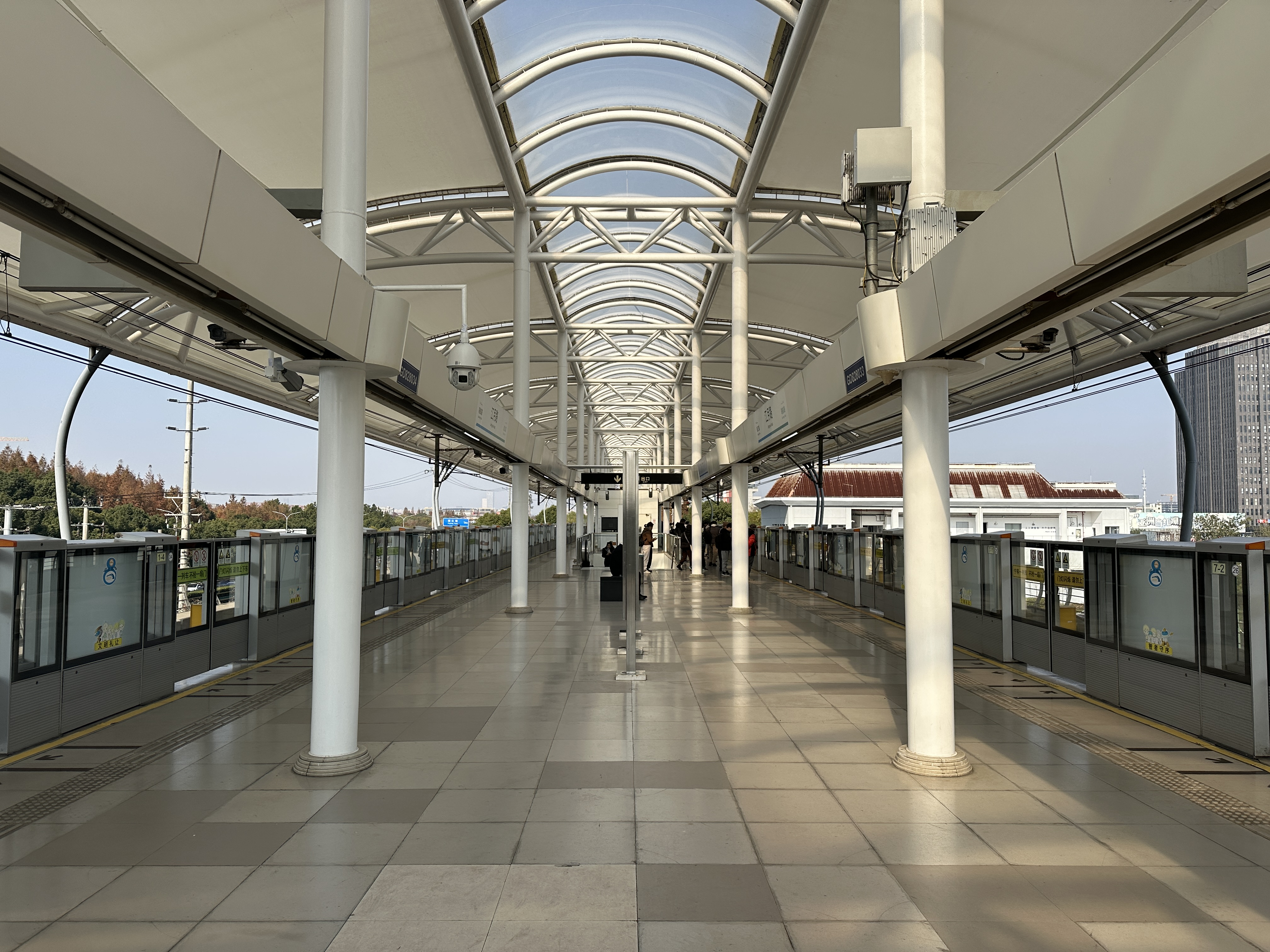
- Station platform

General information
- Location: Shanghai; China
- Coordinates: 31.0861°N 121.504°E
- Operated by: Shanghai No. 4 Metro Operation Co. Ltd.
- Line: Line 8
- Platforms: 2 (1 island platform)
- Tracks: 2

Construction
- Structure type: Elevated
- Accessible: Yes

History
- Opened: July 5, 2009

Services
Preceding station	Shanghai Metro	Following station
Pujiang Town towards Shiguang Road	Line 8	Lianhang Road towards Shendu Highway
Location

Jiangyue Road (Chinese: 江月路; pinyin: Jiāngyuè Lù) is a station on Line 8 of the Shanghai Metro. This station is part of the southern extension of Line 8 and opened on July 5, 2009. It is located near the junction of Puxing Highway and Jiangyue Road.
