= Dongchengyi Road station =

Shanghai Metro station

Dongchengyi Road 东城一路
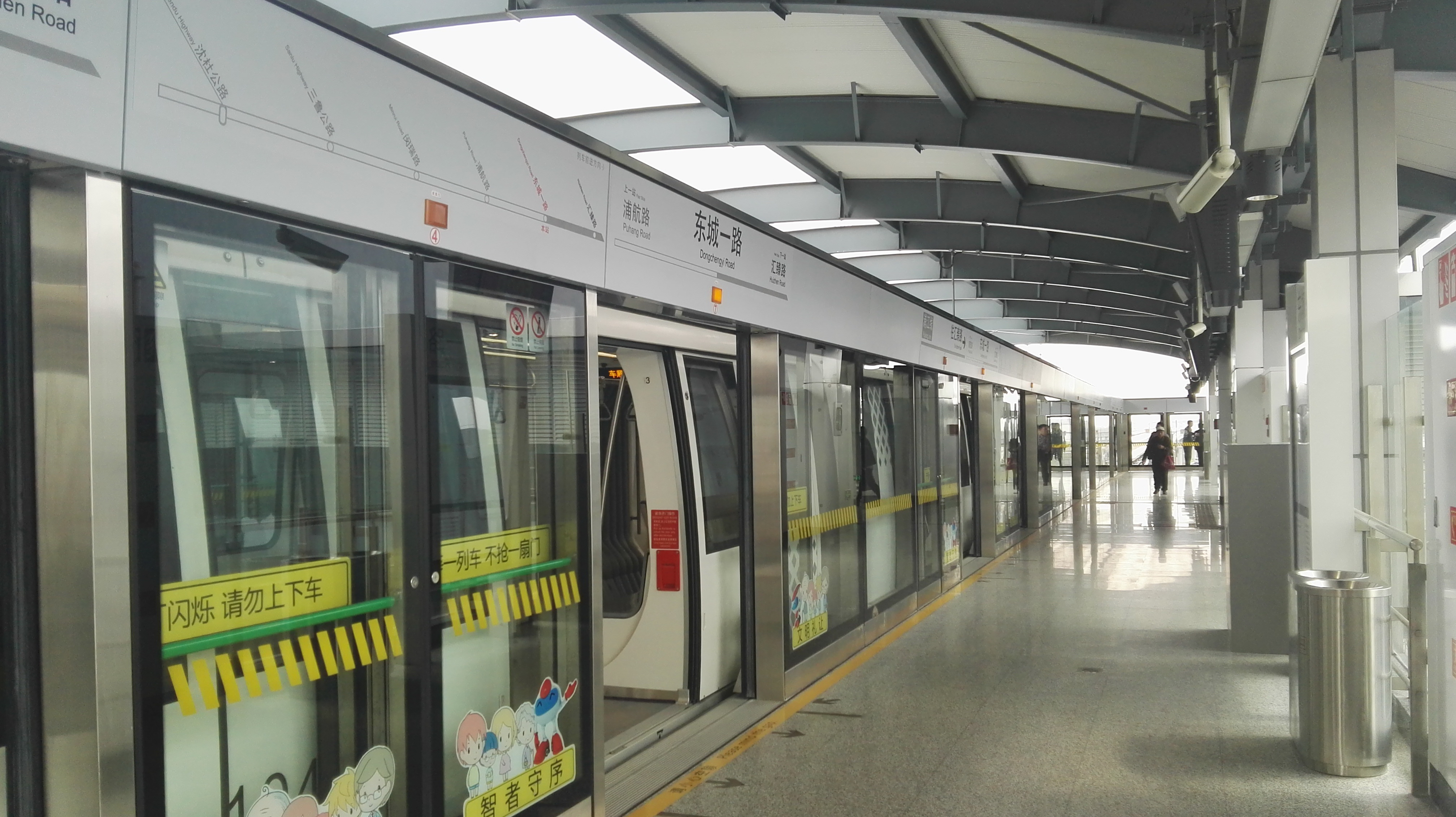
- Station platform, Huizhen Road-bound side

General information
- Location: Sanlu Highway at Dongchengyi Road; Minhang District, Shanghai; China
- Coordinates: 31.032639°N 121.527812°E
- Operated by: Shanghai Keolis Public Transport Operation Management Co. Ltd.
- Line: Pujiang Line
- Platforms: 2 (2 side platforms)
- Tracks: 2

Construction
- Structure type: Elevated
- Accessible: Yes

History
- Opened: March 31, 2018

Services
Preceding station	Shanghai Metro	Following station
Puhang Road towards Shendu Highway	Pujiang Line	Huizhen Road Terminus
Location

Dongchengyi Road (simplified Chinese: 东城一路; traditional Chinese: 東城一路; pinyin: Dōngchéngyī Lù) is a station on the Pujiang line of the Shanghai Metro. The station is located at the intersection of Sanlu Highway and Dongchengyi Road, between Puhang Road and Huizhen Road, the southern terminus of the line. It began passenger trial operations with the rest of the Pujiang line on March 31, 2018.

== History ==
This station opened for passenger operations on March 31, 2018, concurrent with the opening of the rest of the Pujiang line.

== Description ==
The station is located at the intersection of Sanlu Highway and Dongchengyi Road, in the Minhang District of Shanghai. The station structure is elevated, with its platforms located one level above the street. The platform level consists of two side platforms. There are two separate concourses, which each allow access to one side platform only. In order to travel between the platforms, passengers must exit the fare-paid area, descend to street level, cross the street, and re-ascend on the other side. Washrooms are available at street level, outside the fare-paid area, on the east side of the street. Like all stations on the Pujiang line, the station is fully accessible. The concourse and platform level is connected by two elevators, one on each side of Sanlu Highway.

== Exits ==
- Exit 2: Dongchengyi Road, Sanlu Highway east side (access to Huizhen Road-bound platform only)
- Exit 1: Dongchengyi Road, Sanlu Highway west side (access to Shendu Highway-bound platform only)
