= Luheng Road station =

Shanghai Metro station

Luheng Road 芦恒路
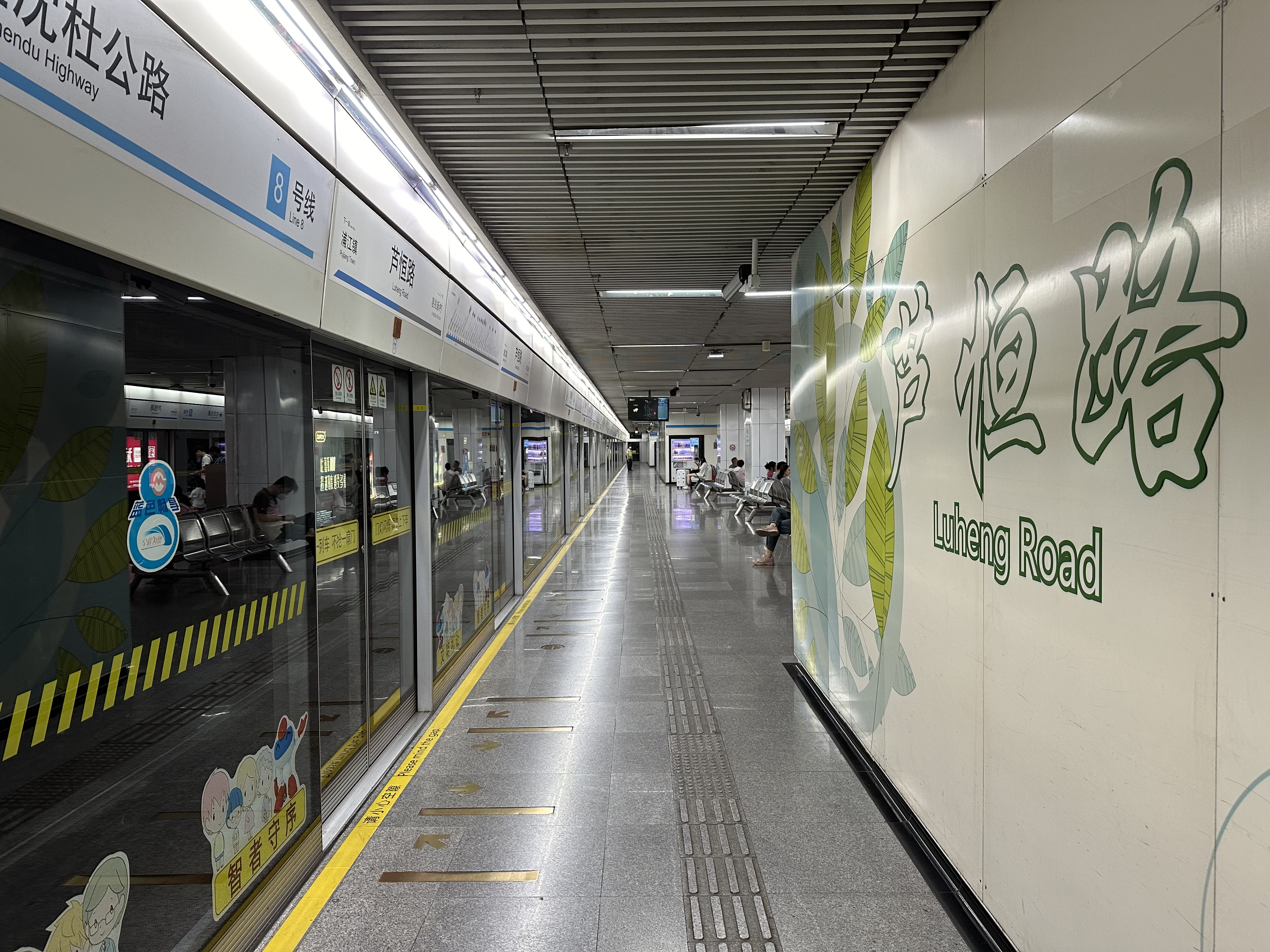
- Station platform

General information
- Location: Shanghai; China
- Coordinates: 31.12°N 121.494°E
- Operator: Shanghai No. 4 Metro Operation Co. Ltd.
- Line: Line 8
- Platforms: 2 (1 island platform)
- Tracks: 2

Construction
- Structure type: Underground
- Accessible: Yes

History
- Opened: July 5, 2009

Services
Preceding station	Shanghai Metro	Following station
Lingzhao Xincun towards Shiguang Road	Line 8	Pujiang Town towards Shendu Highway
Location

Luheng Road (Chinese: 芦恒路; pinyin: Lúhéng Lù) is a station on Line 8 of the Shanghai Metro. This station is part of the southern extension of Line 8 and opened on July 5, 2009.

It is located near the junction of Puxing Highway and Luheng Road in Minhang District.
