= Lingzhao Xincun station =

Shanghai Metro station

Lingzhao Xincun 凌兆新村
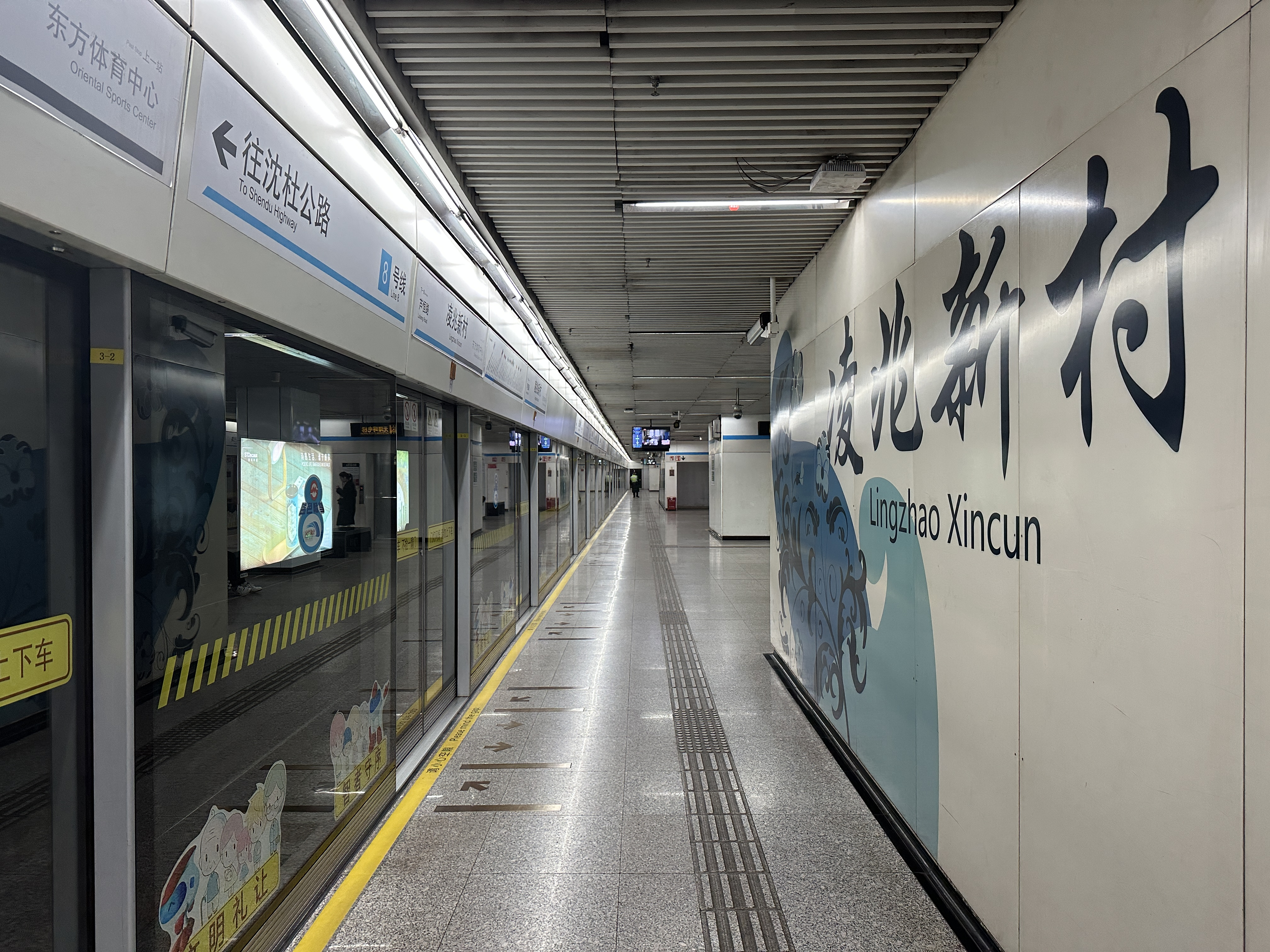
- Station platform

General information
- Location: Shanghai; China
- Coordinates: 31.1425°N 121.485°E
- Operated by: Shanghai No. 4 Metro Operation Co. Ltd.
- Line: Line 8
- Platforms: 2 (1 island platform)
- Tracks: 2

Construction
- Structure type: Underground
- Accessible: Yes

History
- Opened: July 5, 2009

Services
Preceding station	Shanghai Metro	Following station
Oriental Sports Center towards Shiguang Road	Line 8	Luheng Road towards Shendu Highway
Location

Lingzhao Xincun (Chinese: 凌兆新村; pinyin: Língzhào Xīncūn) is a station on Line 8 of the Shanghai Metro. This station is part of the southern extension of Line 8 and opened on July 5, 2009.

It is located near the junction of Jiyang Road and Lingzhao Road, in Shanghai's Pudong New Area.
