= Qionglai City =

Qionglai 邛崃市
- County-level city
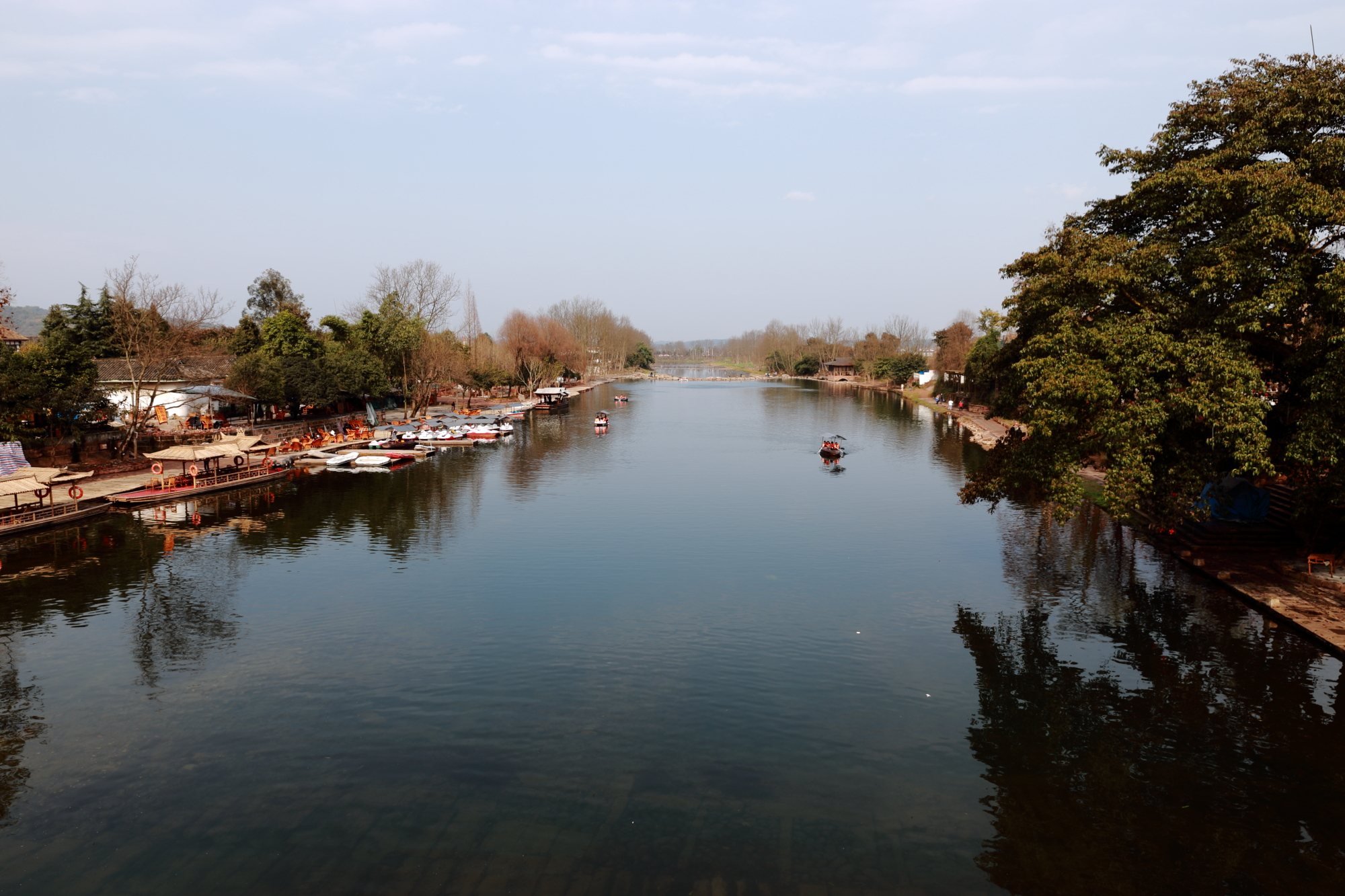

- Location in Sichuan
- Coordinates: 30°24′22″N 103°27′32″E
- Country: China
- Province: Sichuan
- Sub-provincial city: Chengdu
- Municipal seat: Linqiong Subdistrict

Area
  - Total: 1,377 km^{2} (532 sq mi)

Population (2020 census)
  - Total: 602,973
- Time zone: UTC+8 (China Standard)
- Postal code: 6115XX
- Website: qionglai.gov.cn

Qionglai is a county-level city of Sichuan Province, Southwest China. It is under the administration of the prefecture-level city of Chengdu. It is located around 60 kilometres (37 mi) from downtown Chengdu. The city is located on the western edge of the Sichuan Basin and in the foothills of the Qionglai Mountains that bound the basin from the west and is bordered by the prefecture-level city of Ya'an to the west.

== Administrative divisions ==
Qionglai City has 6 subdistricts and 8 towns. Qionglai City People's Government is located in Wenjun Street No. 108, Linqiong Subdistrict.

subdistricts

- Wenjun Subdistrict (文君街道)
- Linqiong Subdistrict (临邛街道)
- Guyi Subdistrict (固驿街道)
- Yang'an Subdistrict (羊安街道)
- Gaogeng Subdistrict (高梗街道)
- Kongming Subdistrict (孔明街道)

towns

- Sangyuan Town (桑园镇)
- Pingle Town (平乐镇)
- Jiaguan Town (夹关镇)
- Huojing Town (火井镇)
- Linji Town (临济镇)
- Tiantaishan Town (天台山镇)
- Nanbaoshan Town (南宝山镇)
- Datong Town (大同镇)

== Geographical Situation ==
=== Location ===
- Located in the southwest of Chengdu, it is located between latitude 30°12′~30°33′ north and longitude 103°04′~103°45′ east, with a length of 68.5 km from east to west and a width of 38.5 km from north to south. The city covers an area of 1,377 square kilometers.
- It is adjacent to Dayi in the north, Xinjin District and Pengshan District in the east, Yucheng District and Lushan County in Ya'an City in the west, and Pujiang County and Meishan District in Ya'an in the south. The city government is located at No. 108 Wenjun Street, Wenjun Street, 65 kilometers from the main city of Chengdu.

== Transport ==
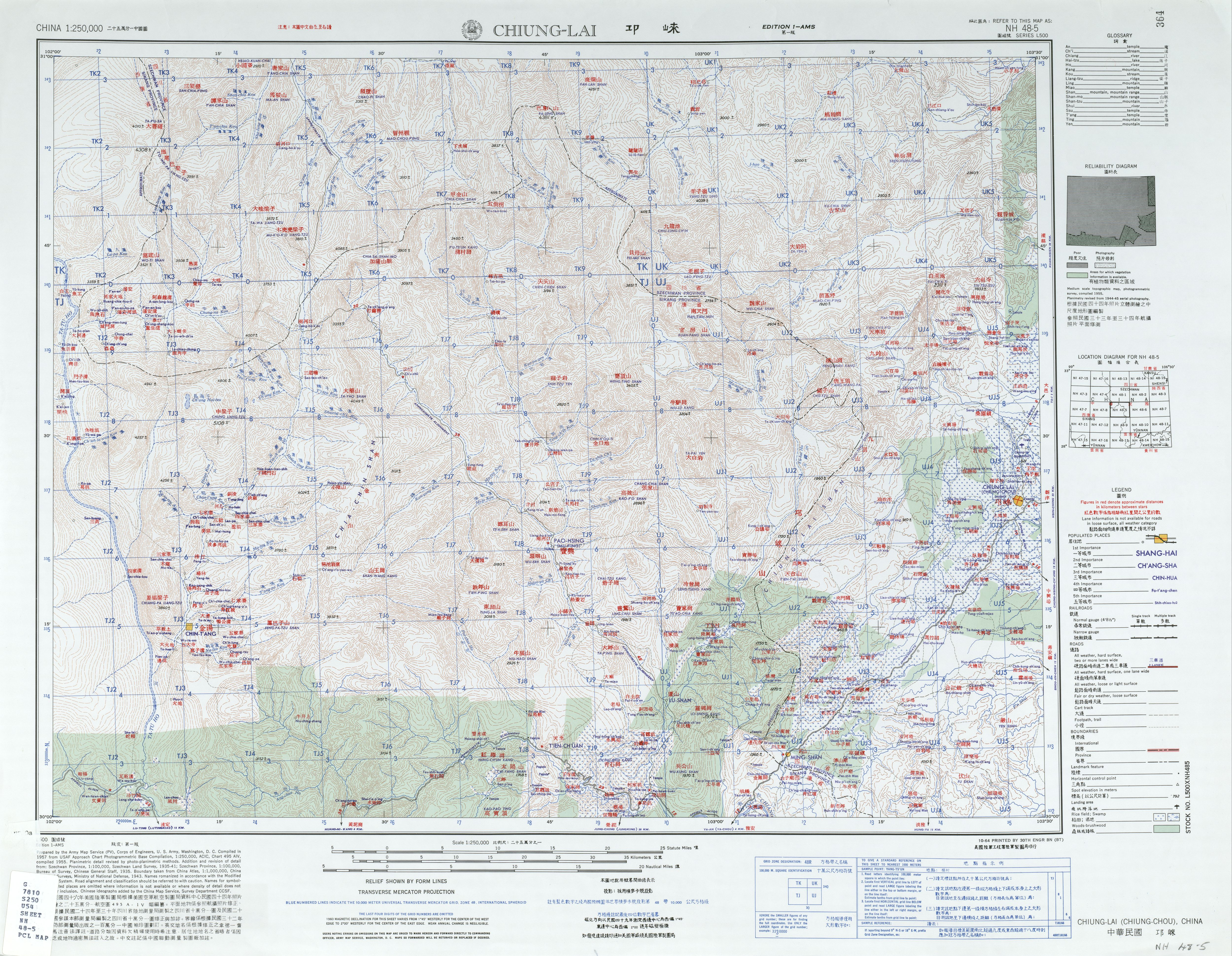
Map including Qionglai (labeled as CHIUNG-LAI (CHIUNG-CHOU) 邛崍) (AMS, 1957)

- China National Highway 318

=== Rivers and Water ===
Qionglai City has abundant water power because many rivers flow through it. The South River, Zhuojiang River, Xiejiang River, and Pujiang River flow through this city, and they are 217.15 kilometers long in total. The quantity of surface water runoff may reach 991 million cubic meters, including 532.8 million cubic meters that humans can use. Underground water can reach 106 million cubic meters. Surface and underground water create many opportunities to support agriculture and manufacture.

=== Hydrology ===
Qionglai City has a wide range of rivers and abundant water resources. The South River, the Dwarf (Yin) River, the Xiejiang River, the Pujiang River and the Yuxi River flow through the territory, with a total length of 217.15 kilometers.

== Climate ==
Climate data for Qionglai, elevation 519 m (1,703 ft), (1991–2020 normals, extremes 1981–present)
Month	Jan	Feb	Mar	Apr	May	Jun	Jul	Aug	Sep	Oct	Nov	Dec	Year
Record high °C (°F)	21.0 (69.8)	22.8 (73.0)	31.6 (88.9)	32.7 (90.9)	35.0 (95.0)	36.8 (98.2)	36.0 (96.8)	39.5 (103.1)	36.1 (97.0)	29.5 (85.1)	26.2 (79.2)	19.0 (66.2)	39.5 (103.1)
Mean daily maximum °C (°F)	9.6 (49.3)	12.6 (54.7)	17.4 (63.3)	23.1 (73.6)	26.9 (80.4)	28.8 (83.8)	30.6 (87.1)	30.4 (86.7)	26.1 (79.0)	21.1 (70.0)	16.5 (61.7)	11.0 (51.8)	21.2 (70.1)
Daily mean °C (°F)	6.1 (43.0)	8.6 (47.5)	12.6 (54.7)	17.6 (63.7)	21.5 (70.7)	24.1 (75.4)	25.8 (78.4)	25.5 (77.9)	22.0 (71.6)	17.5 (63.5)	12.9 (55.2)	7.6 (45.7)	16.8 (62.3)
Mean daily minimum °C (°F)	3.5 (38.3)	5.7 (42.3)	9.1 (48.4)	13.6 (56.5)	17.5 (63.5)	20.5 (68.9)	22.4 (72.3)	22.1 (71.8)	19.4 (66.9)	15.2 (59.4)	10.4 (50.7)	5.1 (41.2)	13.7 (56.7)
Record low °C (°F)	−4.0 (24.8)	−2.9 (26.8)	−0.9 (30.4)	5.0 (41.0)	7.0 (44.6)	13.8 (56.8)	16.4 (61.5)	17.0 (62.6)	12.3 (54.1)	4.2 (39.6)	0.2 (32.4)	−4.5 (23.9)	−4.5 (23.9)
Average precipitation mm (inches)	11.7 (0.46)	17.0 (0.67)	31.4 (1.24)	64.1 (2.52)	87.3 (3.44)	116.9 (4.60)	218.0 (8.58)	270.8 (10.66)	135.1 (5.32)	55.0 (2.17)	23.0 (0.91)	11.0 (0.43)	1,041.3 (41)
Average precipitation days (≥ 0.1 mm)	10.2	10.1	13.1	14.6	15.2	16.7	16.8	16.3	17.6	17.1	10.3	8.3	166.3
Average snowy days	0.9	0.3	0	0	0	0	0	0	0	0	0	0.3	1.5
Average relative humidity (%)	83	80	78	77	75	79	83	83	85	86	85	85	82
Mean monthly sunshine hours	42.8	51.7	75.4	98.7	102.2	93.7	111.8	117.6	58.6	45.7	50.5	46.2	894.9
Percentage possible sunshine	13	16	20	25	24	22	26	29	16	13	16	15	20
Source: China Meteorological Administration all-time extreme temperature all-time January high

== See also ==
- Qionglai Air Base
- Stone Pagoda Temple
