= Lianhang Road station =

Shanghai Metro station

Lianhang Road 联航路
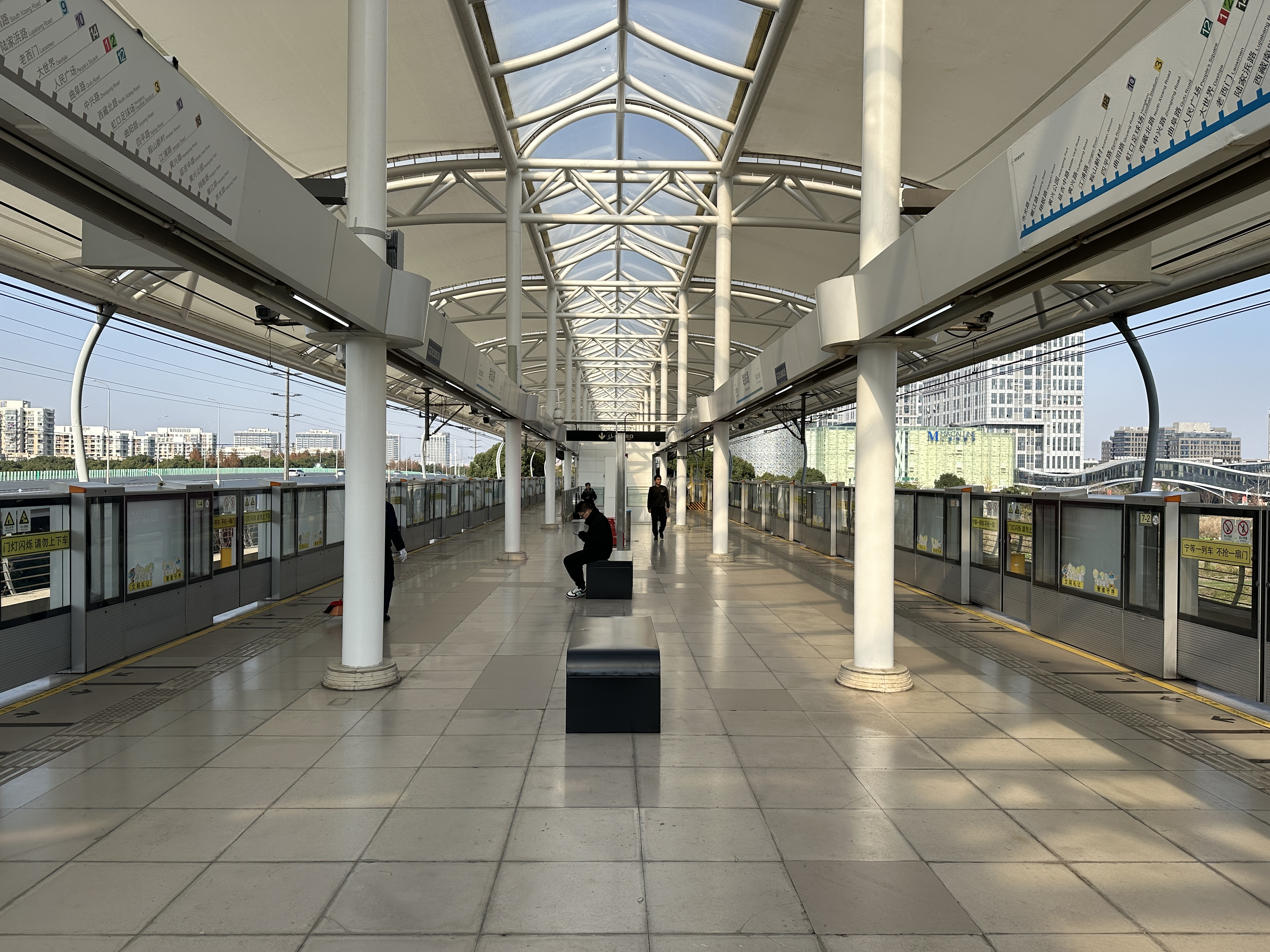
- Station platform

General information
- Location: Puxing Highway (浦星公路) and Lianyi Road (联谊路); Pujiang, Minhang District, Shanghai; China
- Coordinates: 31.0756°N 121.506°E
- Operated by: Shanghai No. 4 Metro Operation Co., Ltd.
- Line: Line 8
- Platforms: 2 (1 island platform)
- Tracks: 2

Construction
- Structure type: Elevated
- Accessible: Yes

History
- Opened: July 5, 2009

Services
Preceding station	Shanghai Metro	Following station
Jiangyue Road towards Shiguang Road	Line 8	Shendu Highway Terminus
Location

Lianhang Road (Chinese: 联航路; pinyin: Liánháng Lù) is a station on Shanghai Metro Line 8.

This elevated station is part of the second phase of Line 8 in Minhang District. It is located at Puxing Highway and Lianyi Road.
