= Luodian, Shanghai =

Town in Baoshan, Shanghai, China

Coordinates: 31.404°N 121.345°E

Luodian (Chinese: 罗店; pinyin: Luódiàn) is a town in Baoshan District about 25 kilometres (16 mi) from central Shanghai, China. Luodian Old Town dates back to the Yuan Dynasty. Modern developments include Luodian Industrial Zone, and Luodian New Town, also known as North European New Town, which is a new town with a Nordic architectural theme. Luodian is a replica of Sigtuna.

Luodian has an area of 44 square kilometres and had a registered population of 49,700 in 2008. It is served by Shanghai Metro Line 7, whose northern extension to Luodian's Meilan Lake Station opened in 2010.

Luodian New Town is a product of the One City, Nine Towns initiative, which was introduced in 2001 and which was the flagship urban design program for China's Tenth Five-Year Plan (covering 2001–2005). Each of the suburban districts of Shanghai was assigned a new town, each with its own theme. Luodian received a new town with a Swedish theme. Other Western themes used to date are English, Italian, Spanish, Canadian, Dutch and German. Swedish architects Sweco produced the design for the new town, whose planned total area is 6.8 square kilometres. Its central area, completed in 2004, was built with an artificial lake, Meilan Lake, inspired by Sweden's Lake Mälaren. As of 2010 the town was still incomplete.

The new town's Lake Malaren Golf Club hosts the BMW Masters, a golf tournament which in 2012 became an event on the PGA European Tour. The tournament took place for the first time in 2011, when it was called the Lake Malaren Shanghai Masters.

Luodian Industrial Zone has an area of 2.7 square kilometres. It is a subzone of Shanghai Baoshan Industrial Zone, which is an Economic and Technological Development Zone.
