= Sanlu Highway station =

Shanghai Metro station

Sanlu Highway 三鲁公路
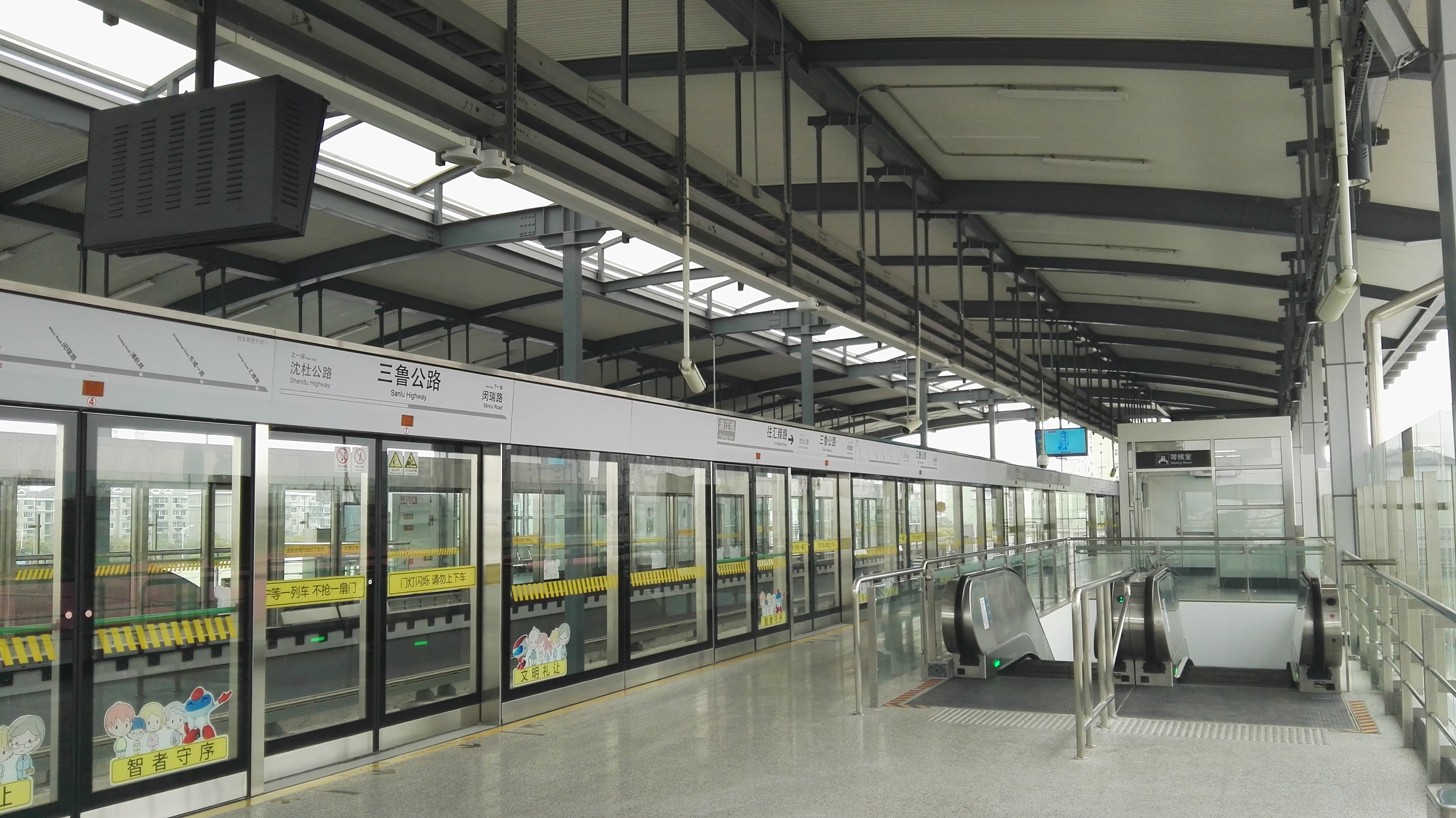
- Station platform, Huizhen Road-bound side

General information
- Location: Sanlu Highway at Pufang Road; Minhang District, Shanghai; China
- Coordinates: 31.058302°N 121.523024°E
- Operated by: Shanghai Keolis Public Transport Operation Management Co. Ltd.
- Line: Pujiang Line
- Platforms: 2 (2 side platforms)
- Tracks: 2

Construction
- Structure type: Elevated
- Accessible: Yes

History
- Opened: March 31, 2018

Services
Preceding station	Shanghai Metro	Following station
Shendu Highway Terminus	Pujiang Line	Minrui Road towards Huizhen Road
Location

Sanlu Highway (simplified Chinese: 三鲁公路; traditional Chinese: 三魯公路; pinyin: Sānlǔ Gōnglù) is a station on the Pujiang line of the Shanghai Metro. The station is located at the northwest corner of Sanlu Highway and Pufang Road, between Shendu Highway and Minrui Road. It began passenger trial operation with the rest of the Pujiang line on March 31, 2018.
