= Pujiang Town station =

Shanghai Metro station

Pujiang Town 浦江镇
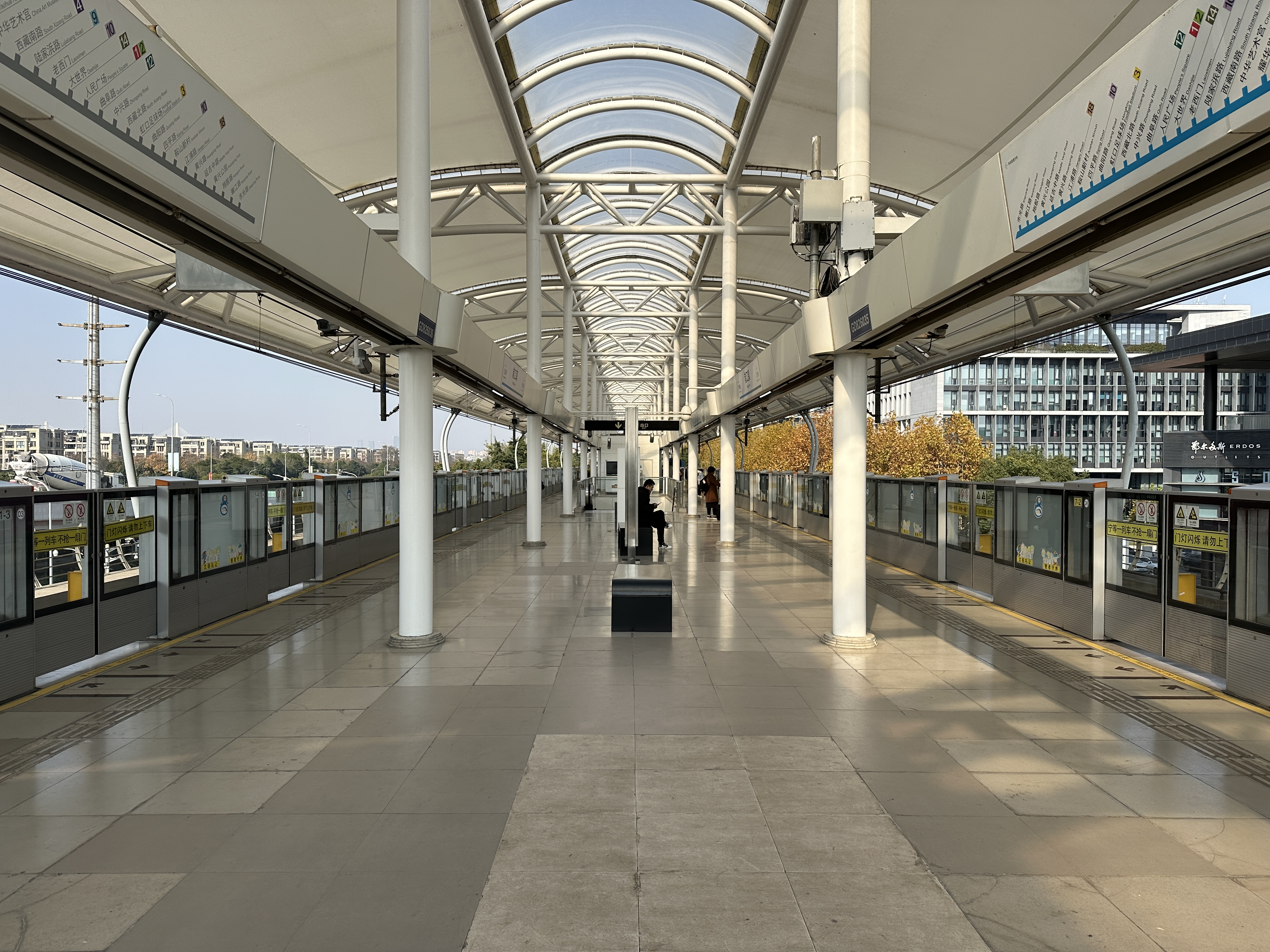
- Station platform

General information
- Location: Shanghai; China
- Coordinates: 31.0983°N 121.502°E
- Operated by: Shanghai No. 4 Metro Operation Co. Ltd.
- Line: Line 8
- Platforms: 2 (1 island platform)
- Tracks: 2

Construction
- Structure type: Elevated
- Accessible: Yes

History
- Opened: July 5, 2009

Services
Preceding station	Shanghai Metro	Following station
Luheng Road towards Shiguang Road	Line 8	Jiangyue Road towards Shendu Highway
Location

Pujiang Town (Chinese: 浦江镇; pinyin: Pǔjiāng Zhèn) is a station on Line 8 of the Shanghai Metro. This station is part of the southern extension of Line 8 and opened on July 5, 2009.
