= Fengjing pig =

Breed of pig

Fengjing
- Country of origin: China

Traits

The Fengjing pig is a domestic breed from Shanghai, China, named after the Shanghai town of Fengjing. Its main locations are in the districts of Jinshan, Songjiang and Wujiang. The Fengjing is classified as a type of Taihu pig which all occur in the narrow region of mild sub-tropical climate around the Lake Tai region. The Fengjing is a large black pig with large floppy ears. It is distinguished by its distinctive highly wrinkled face and also has a wrinkled body. The Fengjing has very high rates of breeding, producing two litters per year of an average 12 piglets at first parity rising to 17 piglets at third parity with 12 surviving to be weaned. Litter sizes of up to 20 occur regularly. The pig grows relatively slowly and has a good, succulent, taste.

The peak of Fengjing production occurred around the late Qing Dynasty with annual production of 200,000 pigs from the town of Fengjing. More recently, interest has grown in Western countries for the possibility of using this pig in the female line of a breeding program with the hope that they can improve the taste, disease resistance and litter size while retaining the fast growth of Western breeds, possibly using genetic engineering techniques. Fengjing pigs were brought into the US in 1989 under a United States Department of Agriculture scheme with the University of Illinois and Iowa State University.
