= Stone Pagoda Temple =

Temple in Qionglai, Sichuan, China

- 石塔寺
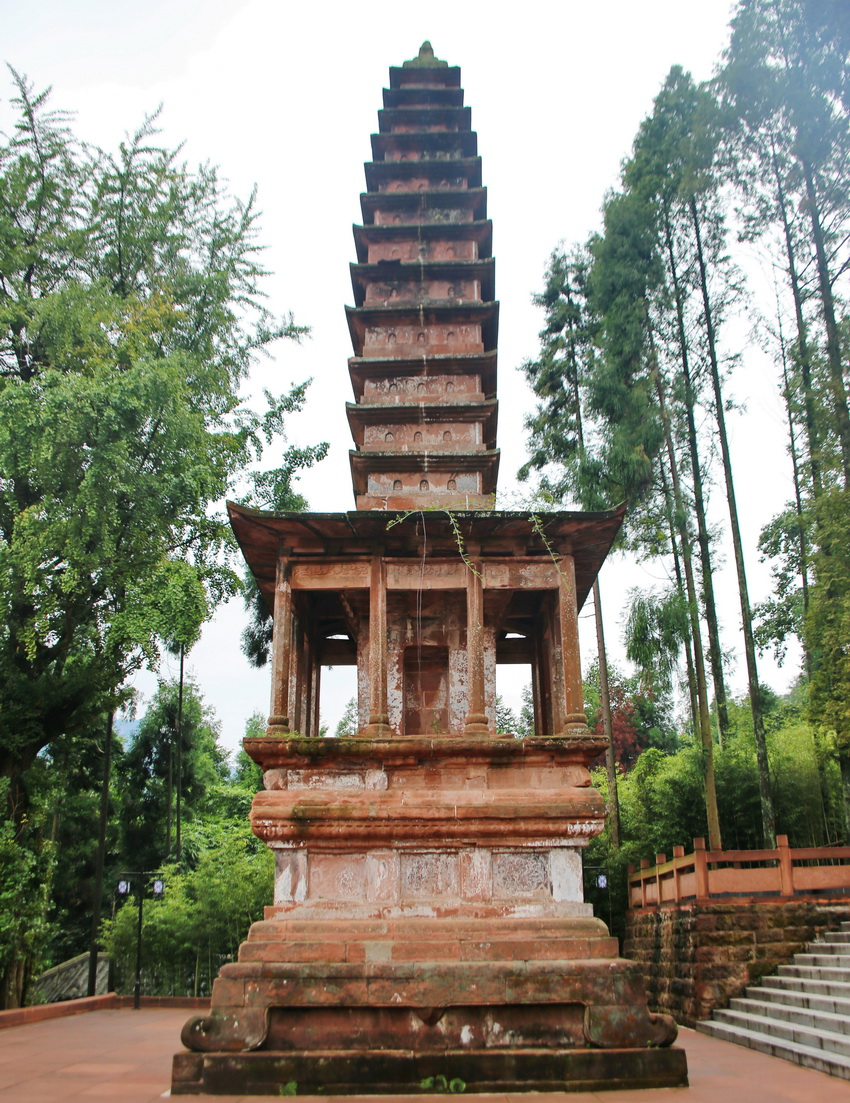
- Stone pagoda of the temple

- Location within Sichuan

Religion
- Affiliation: Buddhism

Location
- Location: Qionglai, Sichuan
- Country: China
- Interactive map of Stone Pagoda Temple
- Coordinates: 30°18′42″N 103°07′20″E

Architecture
- Established: Song Dynasty

The Stone Pagoda Temple (Chinese: 石塔寺; pinyin: Shí Tǎ Sì) of Qionglai City, Sichuan province, China, is a temple first built during the Song dynasty that features a stone pagoda.

== History ==
The temple was originally called the 'Temple of Great Mercy', but its name was later changed to reflect to pagoda within. The temple and pagoda were both first constructed during the Southern Song dynasty between the years 1165–1173. The temple has been rebuilt many times since then, but the relics within the pagoda still date from its period of construction.

== Pagoda ==
The pagoda has 13 floors, is 17 meters tall and is built using red sandstone. The pagoda is built on a large base, with the first floor being considerably taller than the upper floors. Encircling the first floor is an arcade consisting of twelve support columns. The second floor and above are all very short. The pagoda's style closely resembles that of a Tang dynasty pagoda, but also has some Song characteristics as well. In 2001 the pagoda was put under protection by the government.
