= Pujiang Line =

Shanghai Metro line

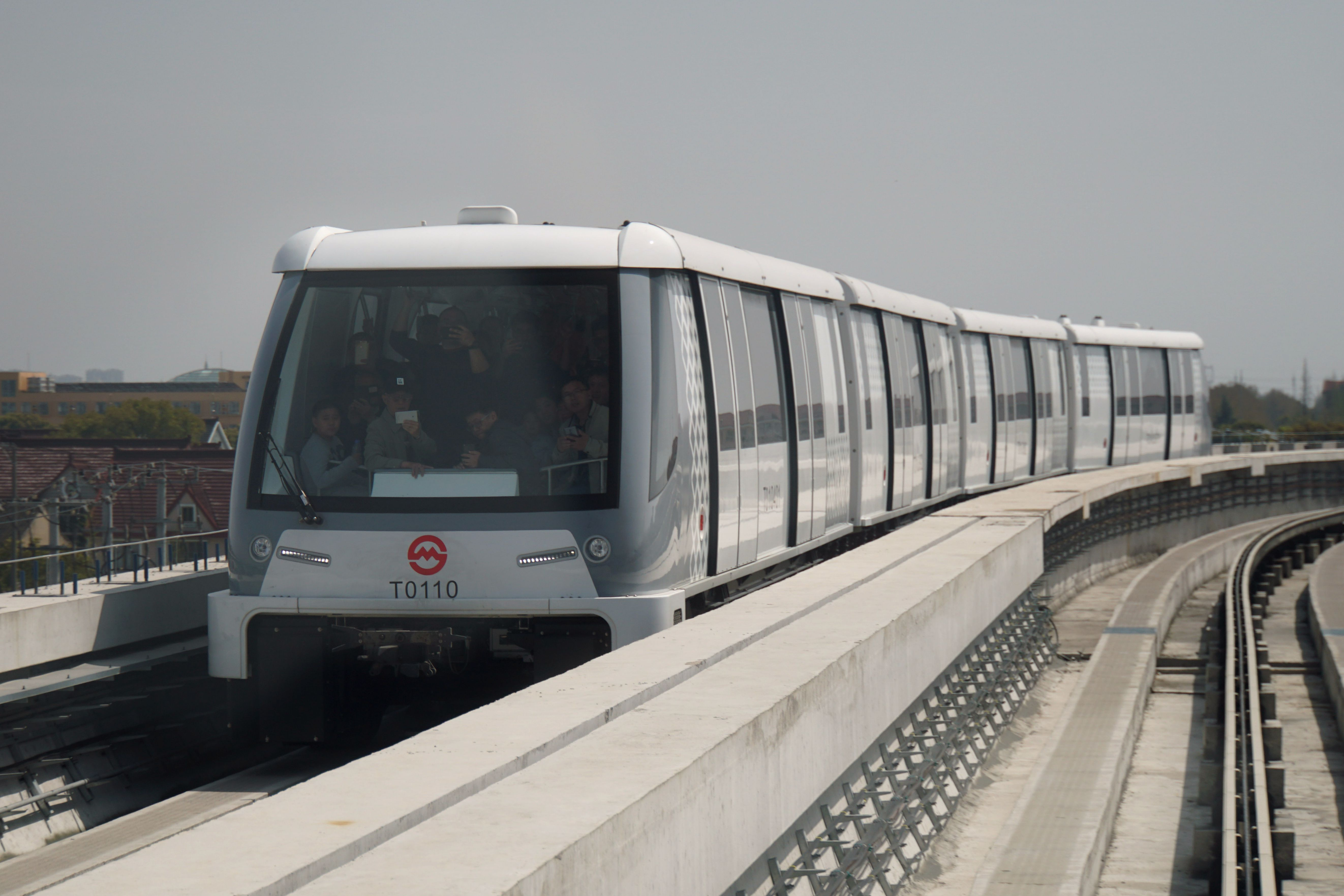
- A Pujiang Line metro car

Overview
- Other names: M8s; Phase 3 of Shanghai Metro line 8 (planned name)
- Native name: 上海地铁浦江线 abbreviated: 浦江线
- Status: Operational
- Owner: Shanghai Rail Transit Line 8 Phase III Development Co., Ltd.
- Locale: Pujiang, Minhang districts, Shanghai, China
- Termini: Shendu Highway; Huizhen Road
- Connecting lines: 8
- Stations: 6
- Website: www.shmetro.com

Service
- Type: Rubber-tyred metro
- System: Shanghai Metro
- Services: Shendu Highway ↔ Huizhen Road
- Operator(s): Shanghai Keolis Public Transport Operation Management Co. Ltd.
- Depot(s): Pujiang town depot
- Rolling stock: Innovia APM 300
- Daily ridership: 41,600 (3 November 2021, peak); 31,700 (2021, average)

History
- Commenced: December 25, 2015; 10 years ago
- Opened: March 31, 2018; 8 years ago

Technical
- Line length: 6.689 km (4.16 mi)
- Number of tracks: 2
- Character: Elevated
- Electrification: 750 V DC third rail
- Operating speed: 80 km/h (50 mph); Average speed: 36 km/h (22 mph)
- Signalling: GoA4 / UTO; Bombardier CITYFLO 650 CBTC
Route map

The Pujiang Line (simplified Chinese: 浦江线; traditional Chinese: 浦江線; pinyin: Pǔjiāng Xiàn) is an automated, driverless, rubber-tired Shanghai Metro line in the town of Pujiang in the Shanghainese district of Minhang. It was originally conceived as phase 3 of Shanghai Metro line 8, but afterwards was constructed as a separate line, connecting with line 8 at its southern terminus, Shendu Highway. The line opened for passenger trial operations on March 31, 2018. It is the first automated, driverless people mover line in the Shanghai Metro, and has 6 stations with a total length of 6.689 kilometres (4.156 mi). The people mover was expected to carry 73,000 passengers a day. The line is colored gray on system maps.

The line is operated by Shanghai Keolis Public Transport Operation & Management Co. Ltd. (Chinese: 上海申凯公共交通运营管理有限公司), a joint venture owned by Keolis and Shanghai Shentong Metro Group for at least five years after opening.

== History ==
Shanghai Metro Puijiang Line opening history
Segment	Commencement	Opened	Length	Station(s)	Name	Investment
Shendu Highway — Huizhen Road	25 Dec 2015	31 Mar 2018	6.689 km (4.16 mi)	6	Phase 1	¥3.177 billion

== Stations ==
=== Service routes ===
Shanghai Metro Pujiang Line service routes
M - Mainline: Shendu Highway ↔ Huizhen Road
Routes	Station name		Connections	Distance			Location	Open- ing	Plat- form
M	English	Chinese	Connections	km		min	Location	Open- ing	Plat- form
●	Shendu Highway	沈杜公路	8 Fengpu Express	0.00	0.00	0	Pujiang, Minhang	31 March 2018	Elevated; Two Side & one Island
●	Sanlu Highway	三鲁公路		2.00	2.00	3	Pujiang, Minhang	31 March 2018	Elevated; Side
●	Minrui Road	闵瑞路		1.00	3.00	5	Pujiang, Minhang	31 March 2018	Elevated; Side
●	Puhang Road	浦航路		0.80	3.80	7	Pujiang, Minhang	31 March 2018	Elevated; Side
●	Dongchengyi Road	东城一路		1.20	5.00	9	Pujiang, Minhang	31 March 2018	Elevated; Side
●	Huizhen Road	汇臻路		1.60	6.60	11	Pujiang, Minhang	31 March 2018	Elevated; Island

=== Important stations ===
- Shendu Highway - Passengers can interchange to line 8.

=== Future expansion ===
There are no plans to extend the line.

=== Station name change ===
- On June 9, 2013, the Aerospace Museum was renamed Shendu Highway (before Pujiang Line began serving the station).

== Headways ==
Shanghai Metro Pujiang Line headway
Time		Shendu Highway - Huizhen Road
Monday - Friday (Working Days)
AM peak	7:00–9:00	3 min and 20 sec
Off-peak	9:30–18:00	6 min and 30 sec
PM peak	18:00–20:00	3 min and 50 sec
Other hours	Before 7:00 After 20:00	8 min
Saturday and Sunday (Weekends)
Peak	7:00–20:00	About 6 min
Other hours	Before 7:00 After 20:00	About 9 min

== Technology ==
=== Signalling ===
The entire operation of the new line is remotely controlled from a central dispatch room. Trains operate using the Cityflo 650 communications-based train control (CBTC) from CRRC Puzhen Bombardier Transportation Systems Limited, a joint venture between Bombardier and CRRC Nanjing Puzhen Co., Ltd. The automatic trains had initially six staff members working at each APM station, but the operator hopes to reduce that to one or two.

=== Rolling Stock ===
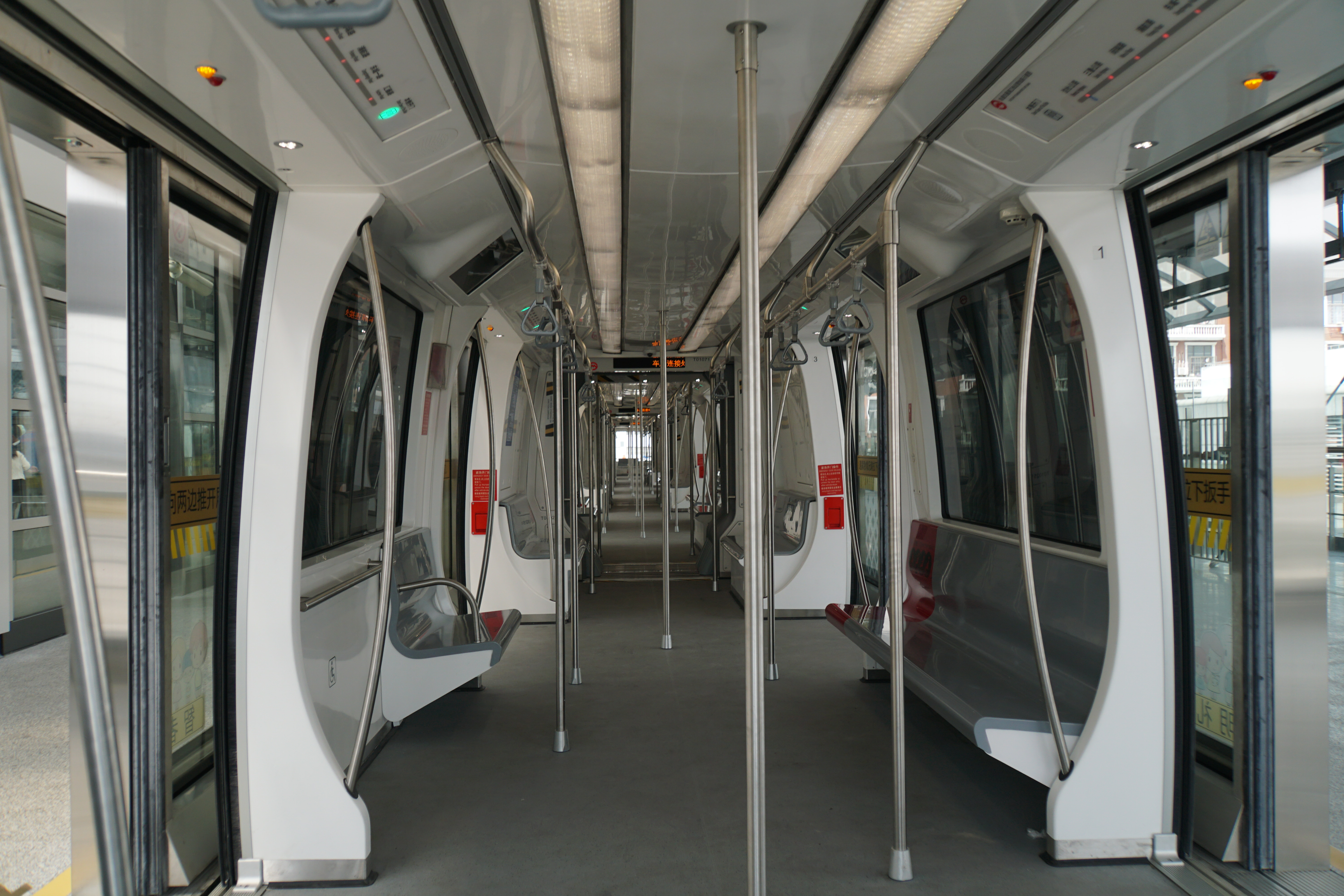
Train interior

Pujiang Line uses rubber-tyred Bombardier Innovia APM 300 trains. The trains have 4 cars each, totaling 51 metres (167 ft) in length, with capacity for 566 passengers per train. There are large windows at each end of the train allowing passengers to look out the front and rear. The small trains with rubber tires running on concrete tracks allow for turning radii as tight as 22 m (72 ft) to be negotiated, compared to over 300 m (984 ft) for typical metro on steel rails. On 13 January 2017, Bombardier delivered the first out of 44 autonomous people movers to Shanghai.

Shanghai Metro Pujiang Line rolling stock
Fleet numbers	Manufacturer	Time of manufac- turing	Class	No of car	Assembly (Note: Tc: Trailer with cab; Mp: EMU with pantograph; M: EMU without pantograph.)	Rolling stock	Number	Notes
44	CRRC Nanjing Puzhen Co., Ltd.	2016-2017	L (Note: Rubber-tyred Bombardier Innovia APM 300 trains.)	4	Tc+T+T+Tc	Innovia APM 300	T0101-T0111 (T010011-T010441)	Cars with rubber tires running on concrete tracks. Front of the train adopts an open driver's cab. Doors are wider (1980mm) than on Type A trains (1440mm).
