= Vittorio Gregotti =

Italian architect (1927–2020)

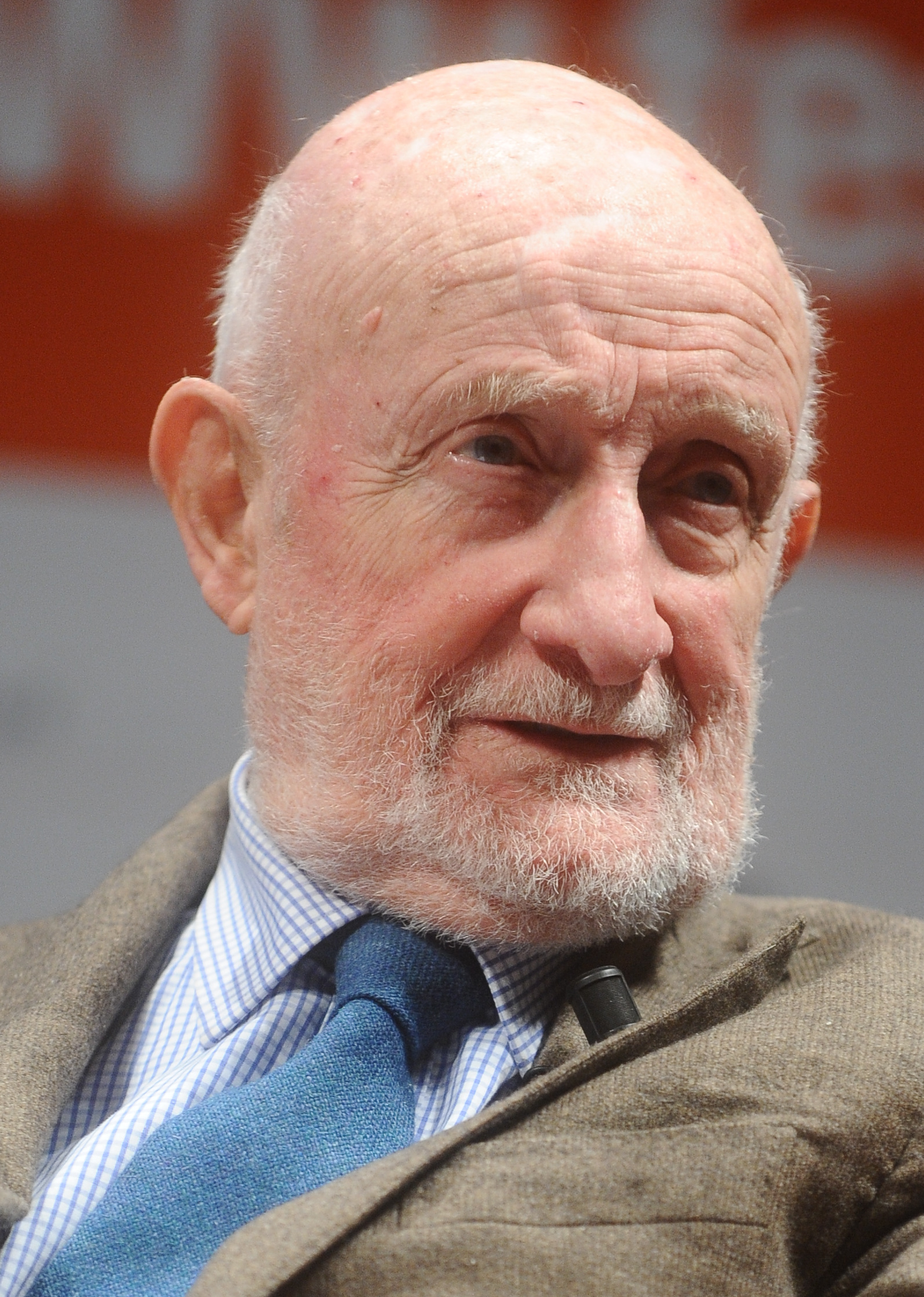
- Vittorio Gregotti in 2016
- Born: 10 August 1927; Novara, Piedmont, Italy
- Died: 15 March 2020 (aged 92); Milan, Lombardy, Italy
- Occupation: Architect
- Political party: Italian Communist Party

Vittorio Gregotti (10 August 1927 – 15 March 2020) was an Italian architect, born in Novara. He was seen as both a member of the Neo-Avant Garde and a key figure in 1970s Postmodernism.

== Biography ==
Gregotti was born in Novara, in the Italian Piedmont, and attended the Politecnico di Milano. He worked as a contributor to Casabella, an architectural magazine, and was its editor-in-chief from 1955 to 1963. Gregotti founded his own studio, Gregotti Associati International, in 1974 but also lectured on architectural theory and curated several exhibits in Italy.

His studio has designed several important sports venues and cultural buildings, such as the Barcelona Olympic Stadium, the Belém Cultural Center in Lisbon, the Arcimboldi Opera Theater in Milan and several university campuses, including that of the University of Calabria.

His studio also designed Pujiang New Town in Shanghai, China, a new town with an Italian architectural theme in the neo-rationalist style. The town was developed via the One City, Nine Towns initiative.

In 2012, he wrote an article for STUDIO Architecture and Urbanism magazine published in its issue#02 Original, edited by Romolo Calabrese.

Gregotti was a member of the Italian Communist Party.

His 1996 book Inside Architecture was recommended by English architect Alan Colquhoun as having "an unusual honesty and philosophical depth of thought".

Gregotti died of COVID-19 in Milan on 15 March 2020, aged 92.

Belém Cultural Centre (1988–1993)

== Books ==
- Inside Architecture, (The MIT Press, 1996) ISBN 978-0-262-57115-9
- Architecture, Means and Ends translated by Lydia Cochrane (University of Chicago Press, 2010) ISBN 978-0-226-30758-9
