= One City, Nine Towns =

Urban planning initiative in Shanghai

Shanghai's One City, Nine Towns initiative began in 2001 and is one of the most prominent examples of the Chinese urban design trend of developing "themed towns". The Shanghai government promoted this approach to encourage decentralisation. Urban planning for the projects generally emphasized Western-style traditions, motifs, and architectural features, with Zhujiajiao New Town using traditional Chinese design elements, Lingang ultimately focusing on an identity as a modern harbor city, and Dongtan using an eco-city approach. All but one of the contemplated satellite towns had been built, as of the 2020s.

== History ==
Shanghai's One City and Nine Towns initiative, which began in 2001, began is one of the most prominent examples of the Chinese urban design trend of developing "themed towns". The Shanghai municipal government promoted this approach to encourage decentralisation. The aim of the project was to find ten attractive suburb settlements to counteract the housing shortage. The municipal government viewed this approach as contributing to the city's development as a "mega-international city" and it was designated as the flagship urban development program for China's Tenth Five-Year Plan (covering 2001–2005).

In 2001, the municipal government of Shanghai announced its Pilot Proposal for Promoting Town Development in Shanghai. The proposal emphasised creating urban identities through tese fengmao (characteristic landscapes) and therefore it proposed that the new towns should generally adapt foreign styles. It proposed Songjiang (adapting British style) as the "city" and the "nine towns" as Anting (adapting German style), Luodian (adapting Scandinavian style), Zhujiajiao (traditional Chinese style), Gaoqiao (adapting Holland style), Pujiang (adapting Italian style), Fengjing (adapting Canada style), Fengcheng (adapting Spanish style), Zhoupu (proposed to adapt French style, and later renamed Lingang with a greater emphasis on its role as a new harbor city), and Baozhen. After the initial proposal, Baozhen was replaced by Chenjiazhen, which was later renamed Dongtan and proposed with the goal of becoming the world's first carbon-neutral city.

Anting New Town was the first location chosen for construction.

As of the 2020s, all but one of the contemplated satellite towns have been built. As of 2025, many are in a second phase of construction. Most have been successful in attracting residents and several still struggle with long-term growth.

== New towns ==
The city level project for the initiative is Thames Town in Songjiang New City. Songjiang is jointly administered by the Shanghai municipal government and the Songjiang district, the only area in the initiative to have this administrative arrangement. Before the One City, Nine Towns initiative, it had been slated by the Shanghai municipal government as an "Automobile City".

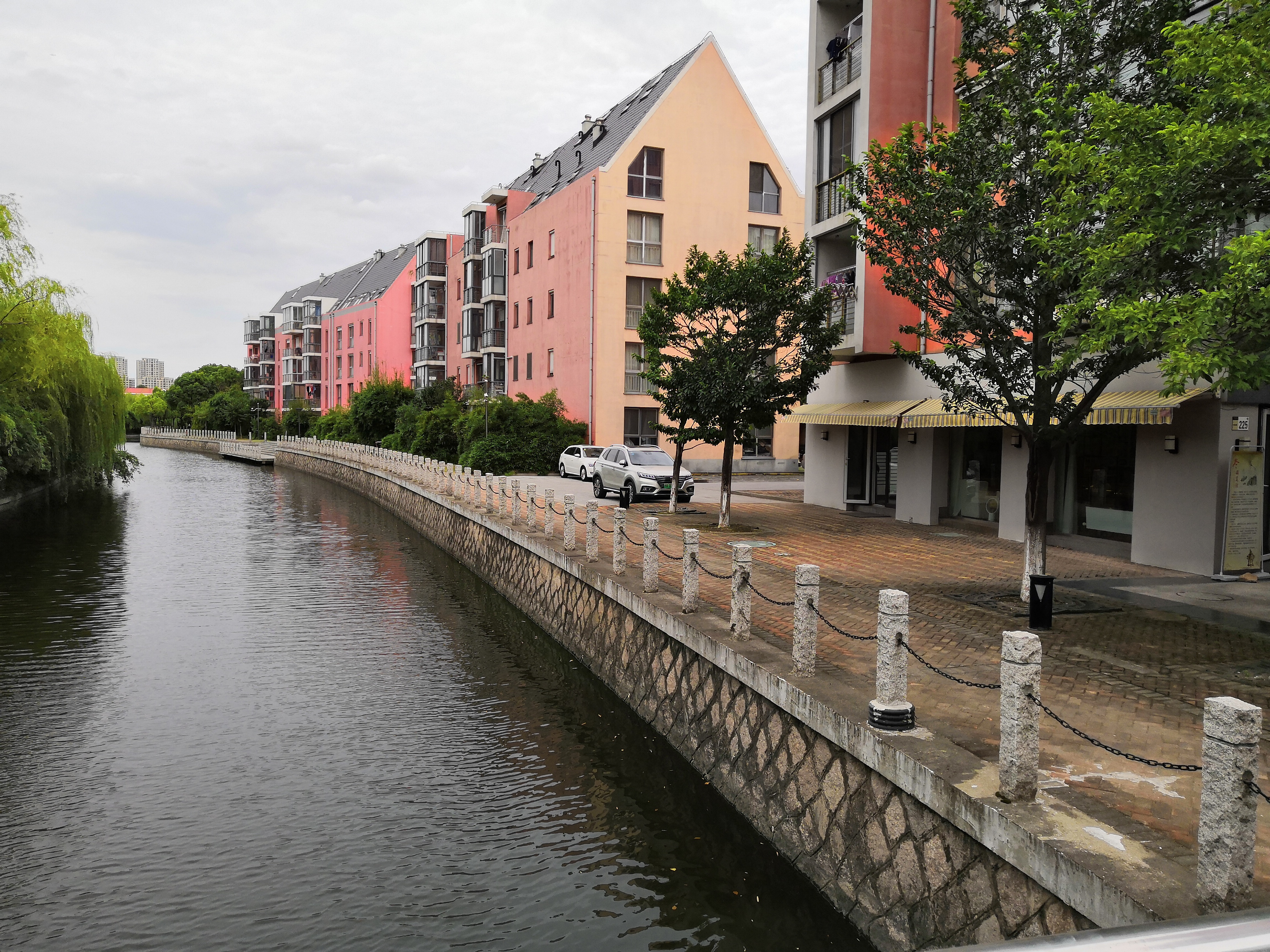
Anting New Town

Anting New Town combines a modern German urban style with a block layout. From the central European design tradition, it incorporates winding streets and enclosed plazas. Oktoberfest and other German holidays are celebrated as community events.

Planning for Baozhen began after most of the other towns. Responding to criticism of the Western-focused designs of other towns in the project, the Chongming county government deemphasized the thematic approach and instead the proposal changed to development of Dongtan Eco-City. Ultimately not realised, the project influenced eco-city design principles elsewhere like Tianjin Eco-City.

Gaoqiao New Town is influenced by the design of Dutch port cities like Rotterdam. Its architectural features include brightly coloured stucco facades, pitched roofs, and Dutch gables. Public spaces include Netherlands-style features like canals, plazas, windmills, and a drawbridge.

Fengjing New Town's Canadian theme is a play on feng, which can mean "maple". The initial architects were replaced in 2010, after the town infrastructure was complete but only one residential area had been built. After that point, its emphasis on the Canadian theme decreased although motifs remain.

Luodian New Town is in Baoshan District, which has been associated with the steel industry given its history with Baosteel Group. Luodian sought to development as a tourism destination through adoption of a Scandinavian style. Wealthy Shanghai people residents use Luodian as a place for weekend trips.

Fengcheng was planned to have a Spanish theme and includes a street called La Rambla, after the Barcelona thoroughfare of the same name. The Spanish theme is not fully executed and historic structures of the old town remain.

Another of the developments was Lingang (meaning "bay front," but which was named Zhoupu at the beginning of the initiative). It is an entirely new town developed 75 km from Shanghai. Following the construction of the Yangshan deepwater container port, the Shanghai government viewed this as an opportunity to develop a heavy equipment manufacturing zone and the new town nearby. A significant portion of Lingang is reclaimed land. Lingang's development was initially conceived as French-influenced, but then changed to a modern harbor city design. Its master plan was designed by the firm GMP Architekten and used a design of circular roads around a large lake, inspired by Garden city principles. Elements of the originally conceived French-influenced design remain. Development of Lingang was initially slow, but the new town's development accelerated after the 2019 opening of Tesla's first non-US gigafactory.

Pujiang New Town was designed by Neo-rationalist architect Vittorio Gregotti. Its design includes neo-rationalist Italian style rather than traditional Italian style. It includes large public amenities at the core of the town with residential areas to the north and south of the core. Pujiang New Town is close to the city center of Shanghai and the Expo 2010 site.

Zhujiajiao New Town uses traditional Chinese design elements. It adapts its cultural identity from a nearby historic canal town and includes features like traditional Chinese rowhouses.

== See also ==
- Urban planning in Shanghai
- Urbanization in China
- Urban planning in China
- Urban planning in Communist countries
- New town movement
