= Fengjing =

Fengjing 枫泾镇
- Town
- Location (shown in red) in Jinshan District (shown in yellow) within Shanghai
- Coordinates: 30.891°N 121.013°E
- Country: People's Republic of China
- Municipality: Shanghai
- District: Jinshan

Area
  - Total: 91.7 km^{2} (35.4 sq mi)

Population (2008)
  - Total: 63,400
  - Density: 691/km^{2} (1,790/sq mi)
- Time zone: UTC+8 (China Standard)
- Website: www.fengjing.gov.cn/html/ywb/

Fengjing (simplified Chinese: 枫泾; traditional Chinese: 楓涇; pinyin: Fēngjīng) is a town in Jinshan District, Shanghai. An ancient water town, it also has a new town with a Canadian theme and an industrial zone. It is a centre for Jinshan peasant painting.

Fengjing has an area of 91.7 km^{2} (35.4 sq mi), and had a registered population of 63,400 in 2008. It lies next to the G60 Shanghai–Kunming Expressway and China National Highway 320. Fengjing's railway stations are Fengjing station, on the Shanghai-Kunming Railway, and Jinshan North station on the Shanghai-Hangzhou High-Speed Railway, which opened in 2010.

== Old town ==
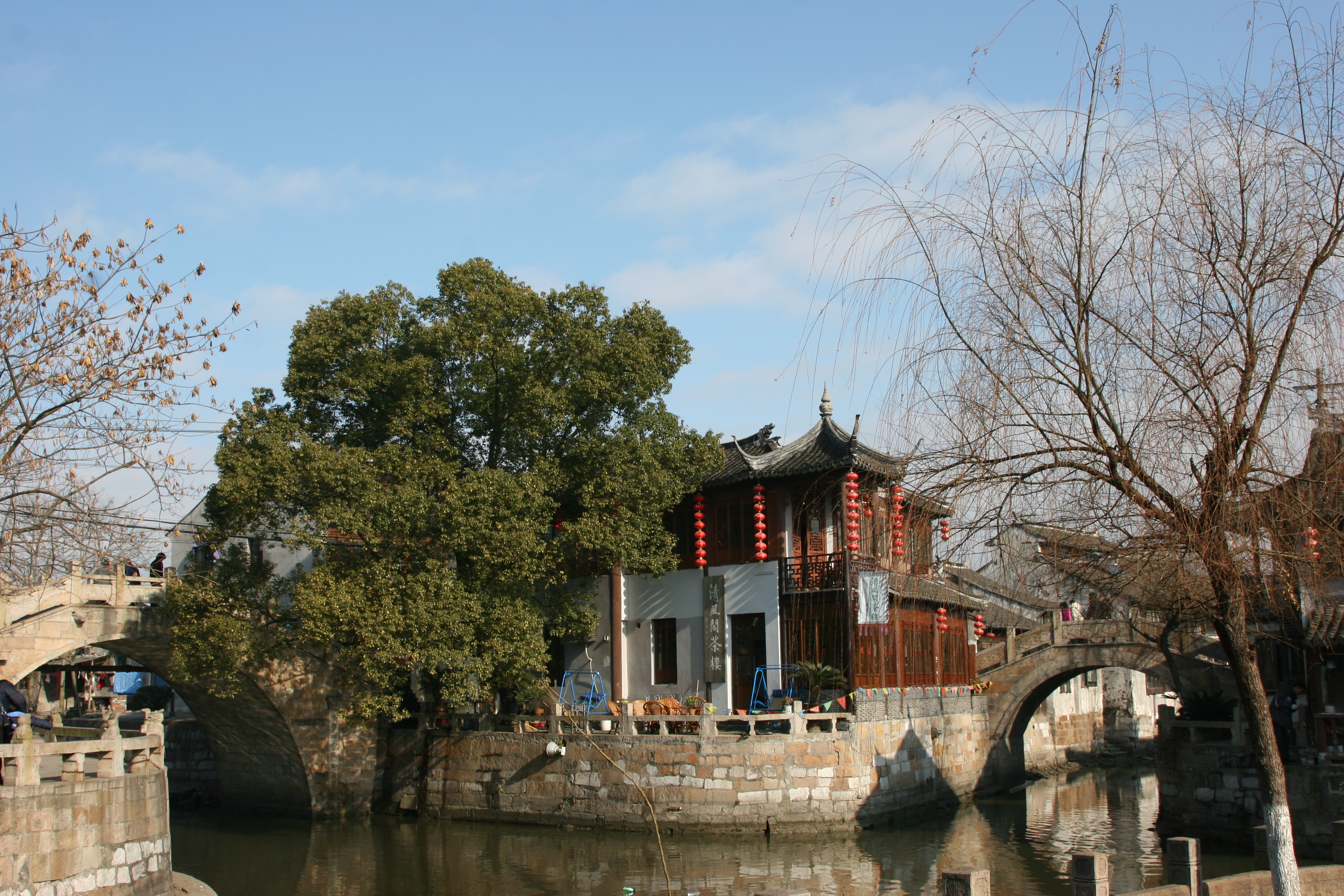
The Three Bridges in Fengjing

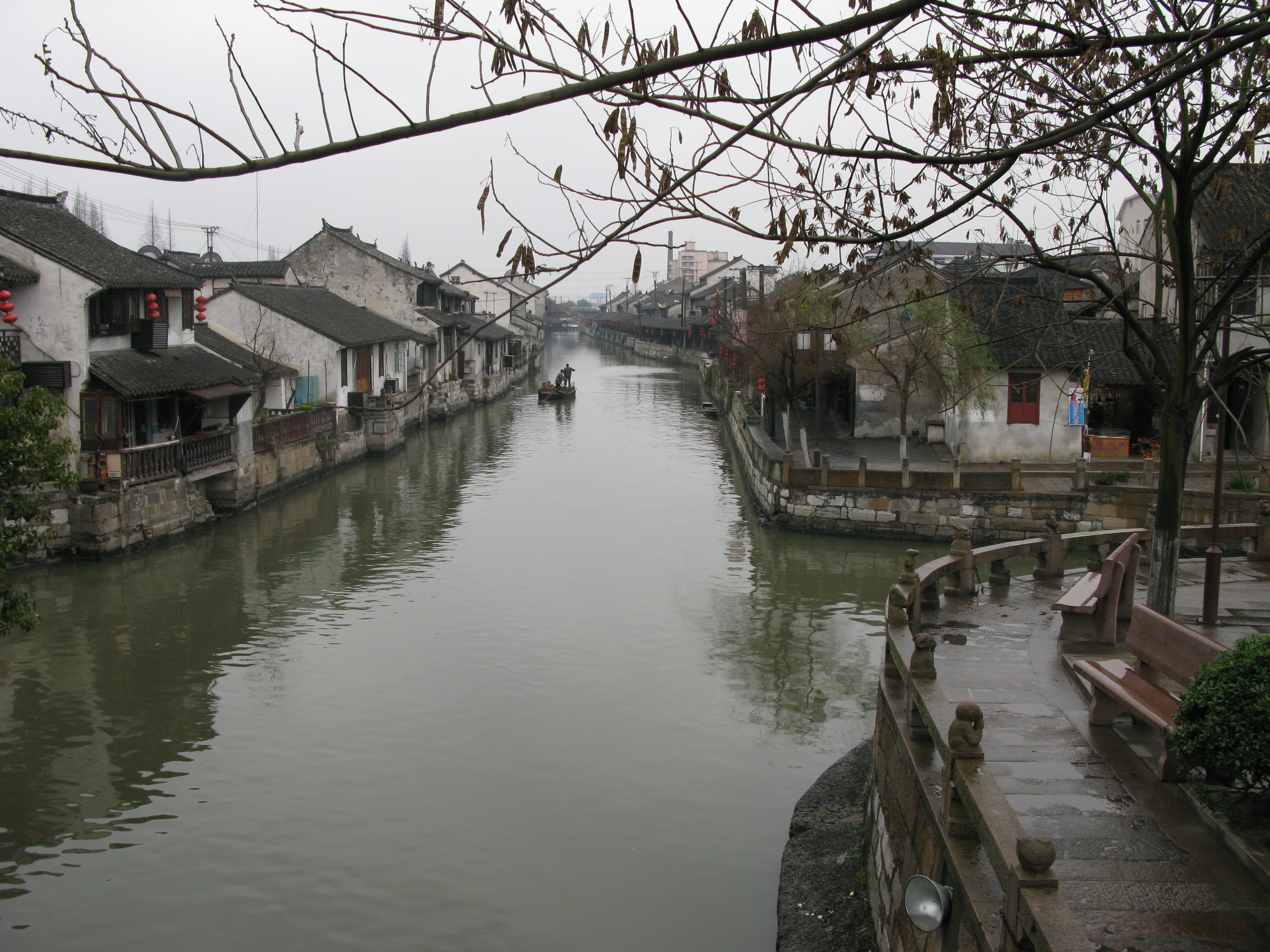
Fengjing water town

Fengjing Old Town is a water town, or canal town, dating back to the time of the Yuan Dynasty. It is known for its ancient stone bridges, including the well known Three Bridges. The town is the birthplace of artist Cheng Shifa and cartoonist Ding Cong.

Jinshan peasant painting originated in the Fengjing village of Zhonghong. Since the 1970s this has become a nationally and internationally exhibited form of folk art. A new peasant painters village has been built at Zhonghong, for local peasant artists to live and work in alongside others from peasant art traditions elsewhere in China.

As part of the development of red tourism, Fengjing has emphasized its "red historical heritage," including through developing the site of its former People's Commune headquarters and a Cultural Revolution-era bunker into tourist sites.

== New town ==
Fengjing New Town is a product of the One City, Nine Towns initiative, which was introduced in 2001 and lasted for the duration of the tenth five year plan (2001–2005). This policy sited one new town in each of the suburban districts of Shanghai, and each town was given its own architectural theme. Fengjing received a Canadian theme. Other Western themes which were used included English, Scandinavian, Italian, Spanish, Dutch and German.

The plan for the new town was for an area of 5.4 square kilometres, to be completed in 2010. In 2004 Canadian architects Six Degrees Architecture and Design provided designs for a collection of neighbourhoods built around canals and a central lake. These designs were used for the landscaping and infrastructure layout of the town. However Chinese designers were then brought in for the commercial and residential building. As of 2010 the town was still incomplete.

== Industrial zone ==
Fengjing Industrial Zone is an Economic and Technological Development Zone. It contains Shanghai Textile Industry Pilot Zone, covering 8.6 square kilometres, Shanghai International Garment Machinery Centre covering 4 square kilometres, and another area of 11 square kilometres whose major products include alcoholic beverages and automobiles.

The car manufacturer Shanghai Maple Guorun Automobile was founded in Fengjing Industrial Zone in 1999, and subsequently became a subsidiary of Geely. Geely uses its Fengjing factory to manufacture London black taxi cabs for worldwide export; this was originally a joint venture with a British company, but Geely took over that company in 2013.
