= Pujiang, Shanghai =

Pujiang 浦江镇
- Town
- Location in Shanghai
- Coordinates: 31.098°N 121.502°E
- Country: People's Republic of China
- Municipality: Shanghai
- District: Minhang
- Time zone: UTC+8 (China Standard)

Pujiang (Chinese: 浦江; pinyin: Pǔjiāng; Shanghainese: Phugaon) is a town in Minhang District, Shanghai, China. It contains Pujiang New Town, which is a new town with an Italian architectural theme, sometimes referred to as Città di Pujiang. It also contains Zhaojialou (Chinese: 召稼楼; pinyin: Zhàojiàlóu; Shanghainese: Tsogalheu), an old water town which is undergoing restoration, Caohejing Pujiang Hi-Tech Park and Shanghai National Civil Aerospace Industrial Base.

Pujiang has an area of 102 square kilometres and had a registered population of 101,900 in 2008. It is on the east bank of the Huangpu River, about 17 kilometres (11 mi) from central Shanghai. It is served by Shanghai Metro Line 8, whose southern extension to Aerospace Museum Station in Pujiang was opened in 2009.

== New town ==
Pujiang New Town is a product of the One City, Nine Towns policy, which was initiated in 2001 which was the flagship urban design initiative of China's Tenth Five-Year Plan ( covering 2001–2005). Each of the suburban districts of Shanghai was assigned a new town, each with its own theme. Pujiang was designated as Minhang District's new town, with an Italian theme. Other Western themes used to date are Scandinavian, English, Spanish, Canadian, Dutch and German.

The Italian architects Gregotti Associati produced the plan for the new town, with a total area of 15 square kilometres, laid out in a grid pattern. A 2.6 square kilometre section in the north of the town was built by developer Highpower-OCT Investment, with the continuing involvement of Gregotti, as well as other Italian architects. This section has garden villas, an Italian palace and a piazza with a bell tower. However, such Italian features were not used in the town's south eastern section, which became a high density development to house the people displaced from the site of Shanghai's 2010 World Expo. By 2010 the new town's registered population was around 50,000. Construction was still in progress as of March 2012. Property values increased substantially due to the new town's location and large public spaces.

Pujiang New Town includes large public amenities at the core of the town with residential areas to the north and south of the core.

== Zhaojialou ==
Zhaojialou is an ancient water town which has undergone extensive rebuilding and renovation. After three years of restoration, stage one of the three stage program was completed in 2010.

== Economy ==
Caohejing Pujiang Hi-Tech Park, a High Tech Industrial Development Zone covering 10.7 square kilometres, is an extension of Shanghai Caohejing Hi-Tech Park. It contains Caohejing Export Processing Zone, Pujiang Intelligence Valley Business Park, and Shanghai National 863 Software Incubator Base.

Shanghai National Civil Aerospace Industrial Base was set up in 2007, with the intention of creating an aerospace research and development centre, an aerospace industrial park and an aerospace museum.

Shanghai Minhang Modern Agricultural Garden was established in Pujiang in 2000. It has an area of 27 square kilometres.
