= Huizhen Road station =

Shanghai Metro station

Huizhen Road 汇臻路
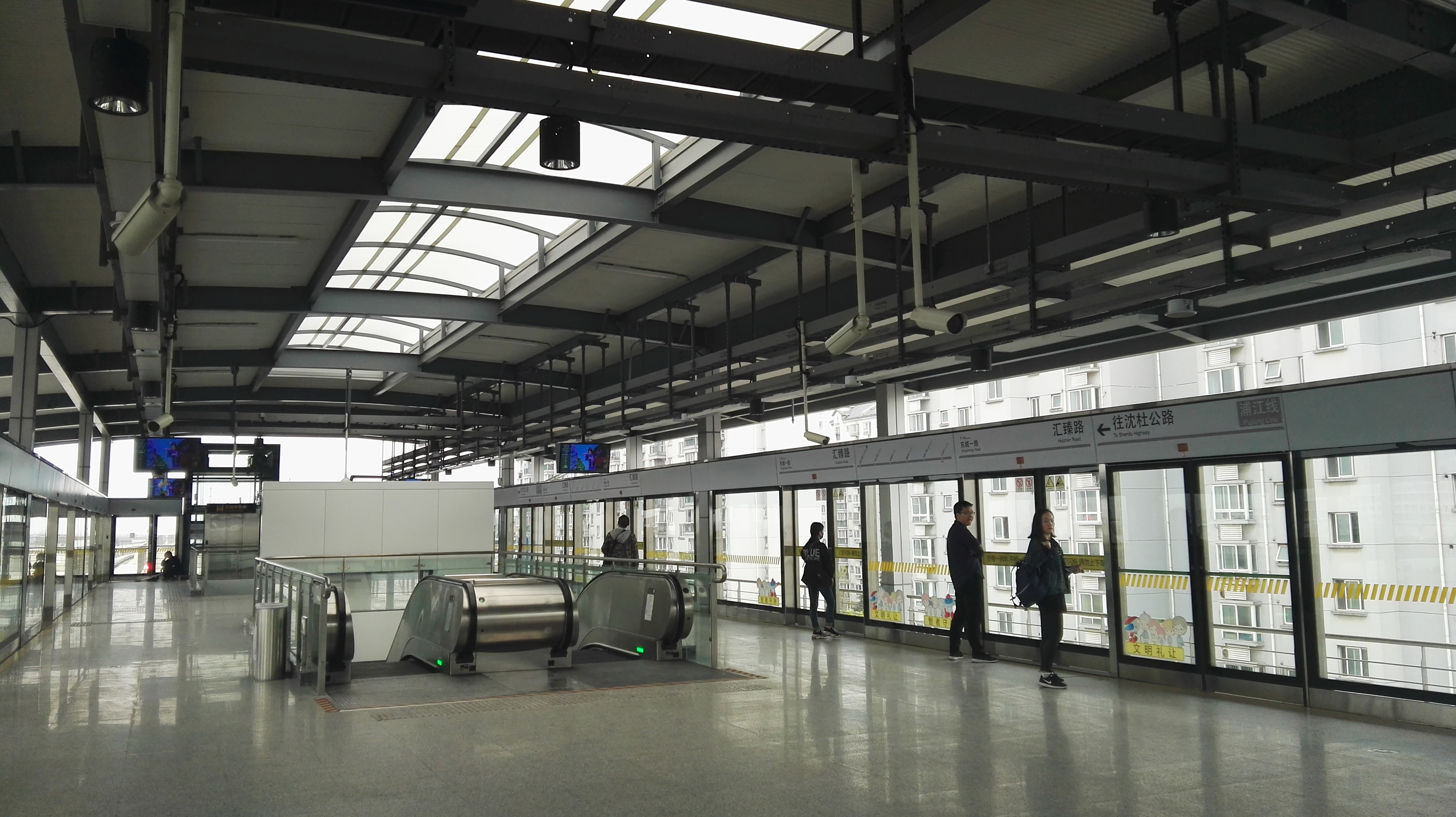
- Station platform

General information
- Location: Lunan Road at Huizhen Road; Minhang District, Shanghai; China
- Coordinates: 31.027442°N 121.520311°E
- Operated by: Shanghai Keolis Public Transport Operation Management Co. Ltd.
- Line: Pujiang Line
- Platforms: 2 (1 island platform)
- Tracks: 2

Construction
- Structure type: Elevated
- Accessible: Yes

History
- Opened: March 31, 2018

Services
Preceding station	Shanghai Metro	Following station
Dongchengyi Road towards Shendu Highway	Pujiang Line	Terminus
Location

Huizhen Road (simplified Chinese: 汇臻路; traditional Chinese: 匯臻路; pinyin: Huìzhēn Lù) is a station on the Pujiang line of the Shanghai Metro. The station is located at the intersection of Lunan Road and Huizhen Road, and serves as the southern terminus of the line. The preceding station is Dongchengyi Road. It began passenger operations with the rest of the Pujiang Line on March 31, 2018.

== History ==
This station opened for passenger operations on March 31, 2018, concurrent with the opening of the rest of the Pujiang line.

== Description ==
The station is located at the intersection of Lunan Road and Huizhen Road, in the Minhang District of Shanghai. The station structure is elevated, with the platforms located two levels above the street. The platform level consists of an island layout. Trains disembark passengers on the north platform, then proceed to turnaround at a crossover just west of the station, before returning to pick up passengers on the south platform. One level below the platform is the concourse level, which has a service counter and fare gates to enter the fare-paid area. Washrooms are available at street level, on the north side of the street, beside Exit 1. Like all stations on the Pujiang line, the station is fully accessible. The concourse and platform levels are connected by an elevator within the fare-paid zone. The concourse and street levels are connected by two elevators, one on each side of Lunan Road.

== Exits ==
- Exit 2: Huizhen Road, Lunan Road south side
- Exit 1: Huizhen Road, Lunan Road north side
