= List of administrative divisions of Shanghai =

Municipality of Shanghai
- Municipality
- Seat: Huangpu District

County level divisions
- Sub-provincial new areas: 1
- Districts: 15

Township level divisions
- Towns: 106
- Townships: 2
- Subdistricts: 106

Villages level divisions
- Communities: 4,463
- Administrative villages: 1,571
- Shanghai Civil Affairs Bureau (June 30, 2019). "上海民政-上海市行政区划情况统计表(截至2019年06月30日)". Shanghai Civil Affairs Bureau website (in Chinese (China)).

Shanghai is one of the four direct-controlled municipalities of People's Republic of China, and is further divided into 16 districts. Seven of the administrative districts together make up Shanghai's "urban core", and there is no single "city centre" district amongst them, although Huangpu District contains most of the traditional city centre area of Shanghai. Today's Huangpu is the result of the mergers of three old districts: the original Huangpu District merged with Nanshi District in 2000, and in 2011 Luwan District also merged into Huangpu. Huangpu District is now the location of the municipal government headquarters, The Bund (the traditional financial district), and well-known shopping areas including Nanjing Road, Huaihai Road, and Xintiandi. Across the Huangpu River, Pudong includes Lujiazui, the financial center of Shanghai as well as China, and has been undergoing rapid development since its formation in 1992. In April 2009 Nanhui District was merged into Pudong. Other prominent business and shopping areas include Xujiahui in Xuhui District, Jing'an Temple in Jing'an District, Hongqiao in Changning District, Wujiaochang in Yangpu District, and North Sichuan Road in Hongkou District. Many universities in Shanghai are located in Yangpu, Minhang, and Songjiang Districts.

Seven of the districts are situated in Puxi (literally Huangpu West), or the older part of urban Shanghai on the west bank of the Huangpu River. These seven districts are collectively referred to as the "urban area" of Shanghai (上海市区) or the city centre (市中心). Additionally, Pudong New Area (on the east bank of the Huangpu River) is also included within the zone enclosed by the S20 Shanghai Outer Ring Expressway, and so is sometimes considered to be the eighth city centre district.

Chongming, Changxing, Hengsha, and Yuansha Islands at the mouth of the Yangtze River are governed by Chongming District.

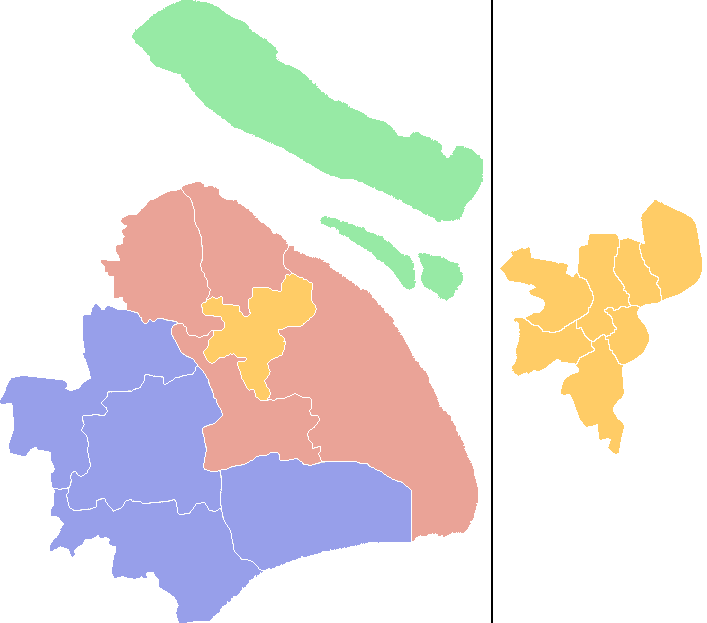

== Administrative divisions ==
All of these administrative divisions are explained in greater detail at Administrative divisions of the People's Republic of China. This chart lists only county-level divisions of Shanghai.

| County Level | | | | | | | |
| Name | S. Chinese | Hanyu Pinyin | Division code | | Area (km^{2}) | Population (2023 census) | Density (/km^{2}) |
|---|---|---|---|---|---|---|---|
| Huangpu District (City seat) | 黄浦区 | Huángpǔ Qū | 310101 | HGP | 20.46 | 504,700 | 24,668 |
| Xuhui District | 徐汇区 | Xúhuì Qū | 310104 | XHI | 54.76 | 1,109,800 | 20,267 |
| Changning District | 长宁区 | Chángníng Qū | 310105 | CNQ | 38.30 | 694,900 | 18,144 |
| Jing'an District | 静安区 | Jìng'ān Qū | 310106 | JAQ | 36.88 | 936,500 | 25,393 |
| Putuo District | 普陀区 | Pǔtuó Qū | 310107 | PTQ | 54.83 | 1,239,100 | 22,599 |
| Hongkou District | 虹口区 | Hóngkǒu Qū | 310109 | HKQ | 23.48 | 687,500 | 29,280 |
| Yangpu District | 杨浦区 | Yángpǔ Qū | 310110 | YPU | 60.73 | 1,210,800 | 19,937 |
| Pudong New Area | 浦东新区 | Pǔdōng Xīnqū | 310115 | PDX | 1,210.41 | 5,811,100 | 4,801 |
| Minhang District | 闵行区 | Mǐnháng Qū | 310112 | MHQ | 370.75 | 2,716,600 | 7,327 |
| Baoshan District | 宝山区 | Bǎoshān Qū | 310113 | BAO | 270.99 | 2,265,900 | 8,362 |
| Jiading District | 嘉定区 | Jiādìng Qū | 310114 | JDG | 464.20 | 1,886,100 | 4,063 |
| Jinshan District | 金山区 | Jīnshān Qū | 310116 | JSH | 586.05 | 822,700 | 1,404 |
| Songjiang District | 松江区 | Sōngjiāng Qū | 310117 | SOJ | 605.64 | 1,973,500 | 3,259 |
| Qingpu District | 青浦区 | Qīngpǔ Qū | 310118 | QPU | 670.14 | 1,278,800 | 1,908 |
| Fengxian District | 奉贤区 | Fèngxián Qū | 310120 | FXI | 687.39 | 1,144,300 | 1,665 |
| Chongming District | 崇明区 | Chóngmíng Qū | 310151 | CMG | 1,185.49 | 592,200 | 500 |

== Further divisions ==
As of 2009, these administrative divisions are further divided into the following 210 township-level divisions: 109 towns, 2 townships, 99 subdistricts. Those are in turn divided into the following village-level divisions: 3,640 neighborhood committees and 1,722 village committees.

== Recent changes in administrative divisions ==
| Date | Before | After | Note | Reference |
|---|---|---|---|---|
| 1980-10-30 | parts of Baoshan County | Wusong District | established | |
| 1981-02-22 | parts of Xuhui District | Minhang District | established | |
| 1981-02-22 | parts of Shanghai County | Minhang District | established | |
| 1988-01-12 | Baoshan County | Baoshan District | reorganized | |
| 1988-01-12 | Wusong District | Baoshan District | merged into | |
| 1992-09-26 | Shanghai County | Minhang District | merged into | State Council [1992]130 |
| 1992-10-11 | Chuansha County | Pudong New Area | reorganized | State Council [1992]145 |
| 1992-10-11 | parts of Nanshi District | Pudong New Area | reorganized | State Council [1992]145 |
| 1992-10-11 | parts of Huangpu District | Pudong New Area | reorganized | State Council [1992]145 |
| 1992-10-11 | parts of Yangpu District | Pudong New Area | reorganized | State Council [1992]145 |
| 1992-10-11 | Jiading County | Jiading District | reorganized | State Council [1992]147 |
| 1997-04-29 | Jinshan County | Jinshan District | reorganized | State Council [1997]29 |
| 1998-04-29 | Songjiang County | Songjiang District | reorganized | State Council [1998]16 |
| 1999-09-16 | Qingpu County | Qingpu District | reorganized | State Council [1999]113 |
| 2000-06-13 | Nanshi District | Huangpu District | merged into | State Council [2000]65 |
| 2001-01-09 | Fengxian County | Fengxian District | reorganized | State Council [2001]2 |
| 2001-01-09 | Nanhui County | Nanhui District | reorganized | State Council [2001]3 |
| 2009-04-24 | Nanhui District | Pudong New Area | merged into | State Council [2009]52 |
| 2011-05-20 | Luwan District | Huangpu District | merged into | State Council [2011]59 |
| 2015-10-13 | Zhabei District | Jing'an District | merged into | State Council [2015]183 |
| 2016-06-08 | Chongming County | Chongming District | reorganized | State Council [2016]97 |

== Historical divisions ==
=== Republic of China era (c.1945-1949) ===
| County / City | Present division |
|---|---|
| Shanghai City 上海市 | Huangpu, Xuhui, Changning, Jing'an, Putuo, Hongkou, Yangpu |
| Shanghai County, Jiangsu 上海縣 | Minhang |
| Songjiang County, Jiangsu 松江縣 | Songjiang |
| Nanhui County, Jiangsu 南匯縣 | Pudong |
| Qingpu County, Jiangsu 青浦縣 | Qingpu |
| Fengxian County, Jiangsu 奉賢縣 | Fengxian |
| Jinshan County, Jiangsu 金山縣 | Jinshan |
| Chuansha County, Jiangsu 川沙縣 | Pudong |
| Jiading County, Jiangsu 嘉定縣 | Jiading |
| Baoshan County, Jiangsu 寶山縣 | Baoshan |
| Chongming County, Jiangsu 崇明縣 | Chongming |
