= Shendu Highway station =

Shanghai Metro interchange station

Shendu Highway 沈杜公路
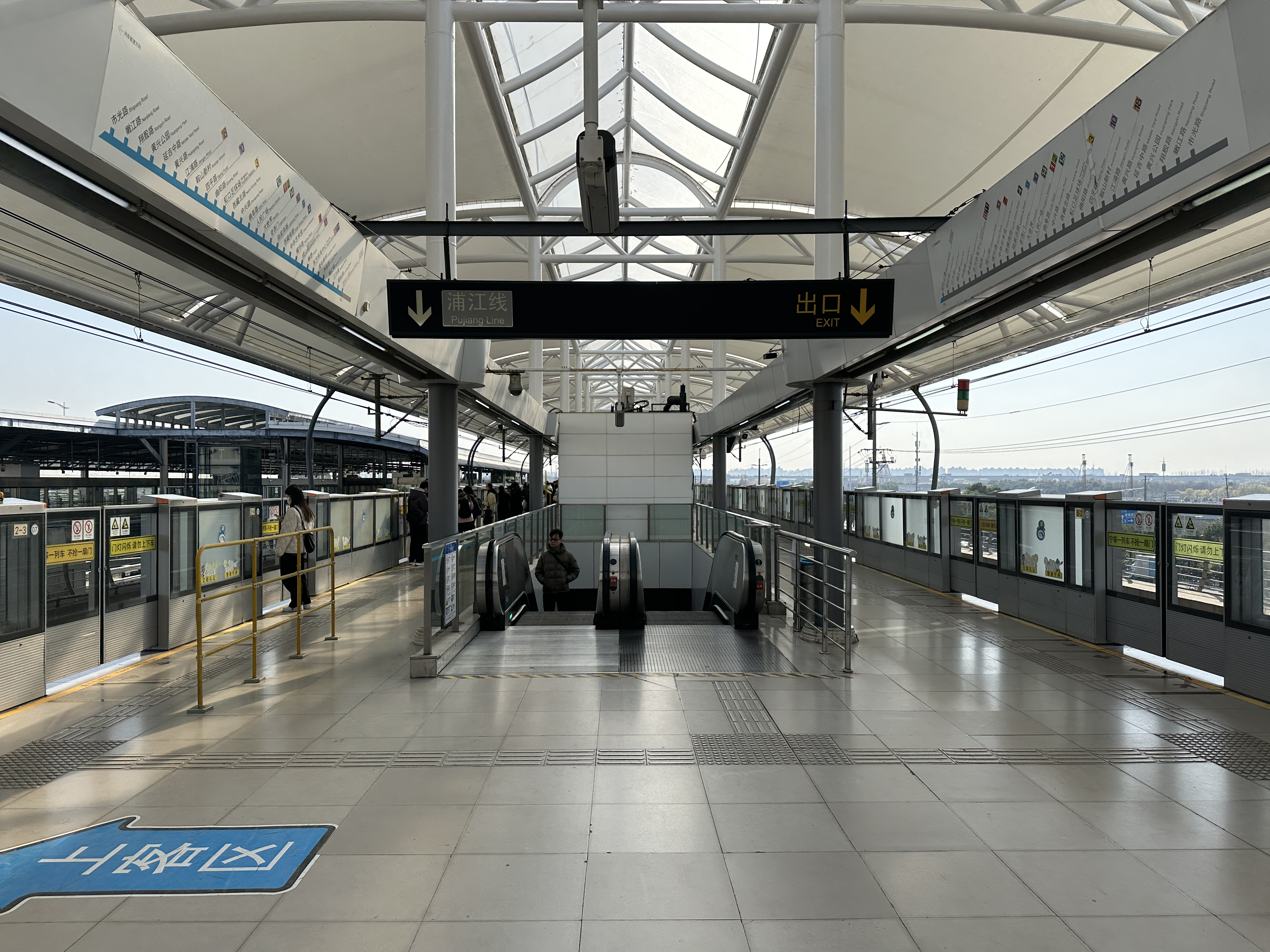
- Line 8 platform

General information
- Other names: Aerospace Museum (former)
- Location: Shendu Highway and Puxing Highway; Pujiang Town, Minhang District, Shanghai; China
- Coordinates: 31.0636°N 121.507°E
- Operated by: Shanghai No. 4 Metro Operation Co. Ltd. (Line 8); Shanghai Keolis Public Transport Operation Management Co. Ltd. (Pujiang line)
- Lines: Line 8 Pujiang Line
- Platforms: 6 (2 island platforms and 2 side platforms)
- Tracks: 4

Construction
- Structure type: Elevated
- Accessible: Yes

History
- Opened: 5 July 2009 (Line 8); 31 March 2018 (Pujiang line)
- Previous names: Aerospace Museum (up to 31 August 2013)

Services
Preceding station	Shanghai Metro	Following station
Lianhang Road towards Shiguang Road	Line 8	Terminus
Terminus	Pujiang Line	Sanlu Highway towards Huizhen Road
Location

Shendu Highway (Chinese: 沈杜公路), formerly Aerospace Museum (航天博物馆), is an interchange station between Line 8 and Pujiang line of the Shanghai Metro in the town of Pujiang, Minhang District, Shanghai, at Shendu Highway and Puxing Highway. This station serves as the southern terminus of Line 8 and the northern terminus of the Pujiang line, and opened on 5 July 2009, with the second phase of Line 8. The station became an interchange station between Line 8 and the Pujiang line on 31 March 2018, with the opening of the Pujiang line further south to Huizhen Road.

== Naming ==
The station was named Aerospace Museum until 31 August 2013, when it was changed to Shendu Highway. It was expected to undergo another name change to Pujiang Country Park with the opening of the Pujiang line. However, this name change is no longer being considered.

== Station Layout ==
2F	Side platform, doors open on the right, drop off only
2F	Northbound	← Pujiang Line termination track
2F	Island platform, doors open on the left
2F	Southbound	Pujiang Line towards Huizhen Road (Sanlu Highway) →
2F	Side platform, doors open on the right, boarding pujiang line only
2F	Northbound	← Line 8 towards Shiguang Road (Lianhang Road)
2F	Island platform, doors open on the left
2F	Southbound	Line 8 termination track →
G	Entrances and Exits	Exits 1-2
