= Jiading (disambiguation) =

Jiading is an atonal pinyin romanization of various Chinese names and words.

It may refer to:

- Jiading District (Chinese: 嘉定区), in Shanghai provincial-level city, China.
  - Jiading Town (嘉定镇), a subdistrict forming the historical core of Jiading District
- Jiading (嘉定), a former name of Leshan (乐山) prefecture-level city, in Sichuan province, China
  - Diocese of Jiading
- Jiading (嘉定), a town in Huzhu Tu Autonomous County, Qinghai province
- Jiading District, a variant pronunciation of Qieding District (Chinese: 茄萣區) in Kaohsiung, Taiwan
- Gia Định (Chữ Nôm: 嘉定), a historical province in Vietnam.

== See also ==
- Gia Định Province (Chinese: 嘉定), Vietnam, known as Jiading in Chinese
