= Huating =

Huating may refer to the following locations:

- Huating, Gansu (华亭市)
- Huating County, Jiangsu (华亭县), former name of Songjiang District, now in Shanghai
- Huating Temple in the Western Mountains, Kunming
- Huating Town, Shanghai (华亭镇), town in and subdivision of Jiading District
- Huating, Fujian (华亭镇), town in and subdivision of Chengxiang District, Putian
- Huating, Jiangxi (花厅镇), town in and subdivision of Shangrao County
