= S5 Shanghai–Jiading Expressway =

Road in Shanghai, China

Shanghai–Jiading Expressway
- Hujia Expressway 沪嘉高速公路

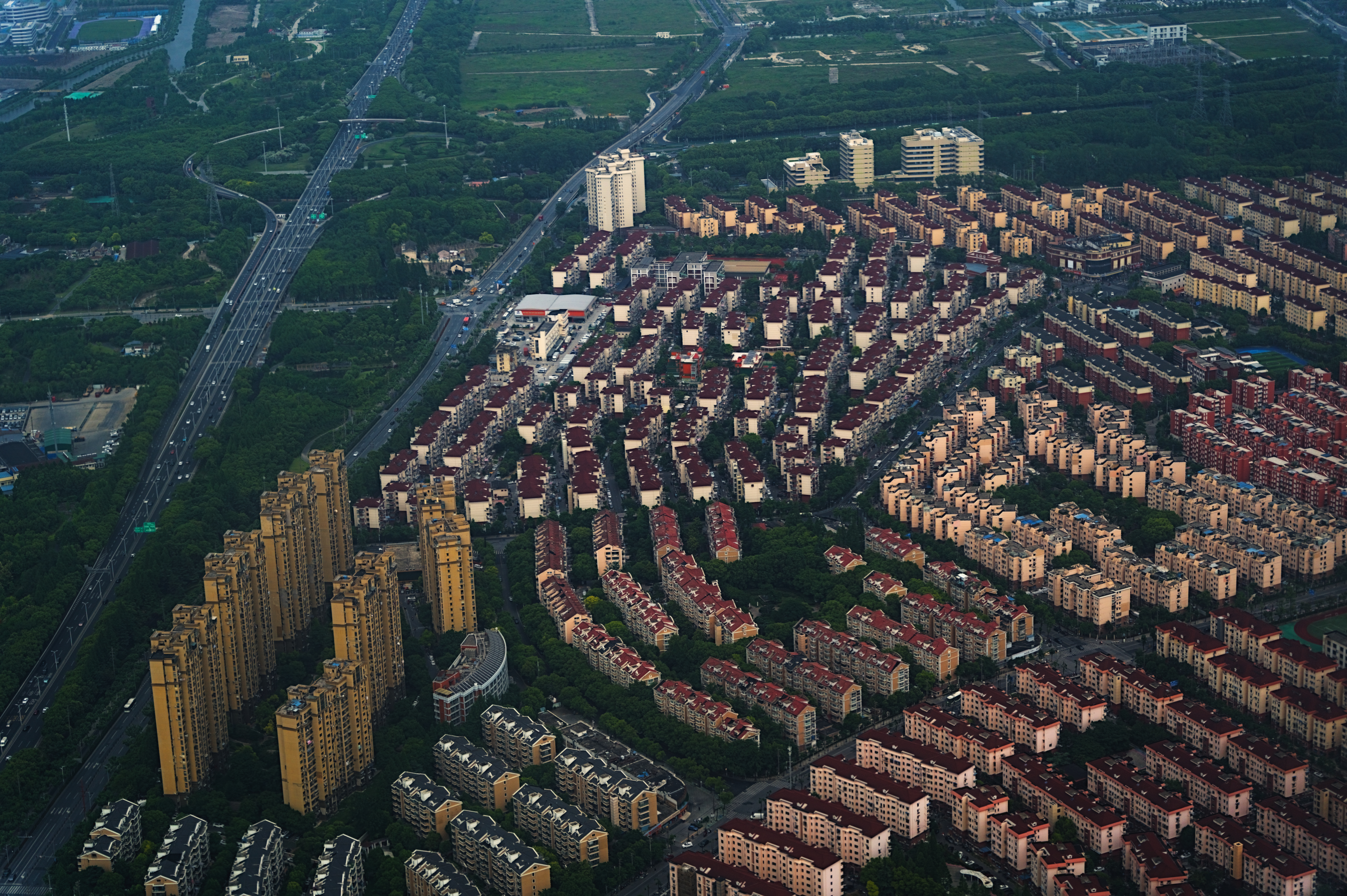
- S5 Expressway (left) beside Taopuqicun (right)

Route information
- Length: 17.37 km (10.79 mi)

Major junctions
- East end: Middle Ring Road in Baoshan District
- Shanghai S20 in Putuo District; G1503 in Jiading District
- West end: Yecheng Road / South Bo'le Road in Jiading District

Location
- Country: China
- Province: Shanghai

Highway system
- Transport in China
← S4	→ S6

The Shanghai–Jiading Expressway, commonly referred to as the Hujia Expressway (Chinese: 沪嘉高速公路; pinyin: Hùjiā Gāosù Gōnglù) and designated S5, is a 17.37-kilometre-long expressway (10.79 mi) in the city of Shanghai, China. The expressway connects the Middle Ring Road in Baoshan District with the center of Jiading District.

Opened in October 1988, it is the oldest expressway in China. At the time, the expressway reduced the travel time from 2 hours to 30 minutes.

== Route ==
The Shanghai–Jiading Expressway begins at an elevated interchange with the Middle Ring Road in Baoshan District to the east and south. At the interchange, motorists can continue east on Middle Ring Road toward Zhabei District, south on Middle Ring Road toward Changning District, or descend to an intersection with Zhenbei Road and Wenshui Road, which are surface-level roadways that run under Middle Ring Road.

The expressway traverses west to an interchange with Outer Ring Expressway in Putuo District before turning to a northwesterly direction, paralleling the route of China National Highway 204 from Putuo to Jiading District. It ends at an interchange with the G1501 Shanghai Ring Expressway in Jiading District. A short segment of expressway continues north past the interchange to a toll plaza and intersection with Yecheng Road and South Bo'le Road. South Bo'le Road, which eventually becomes Bo'le Road, is a major arterial roadway into the old city center of Jiading District.

The expressway is tolled from just west of the Outer Ring Expressway to its western terminus in Jiading District. It has two lanes in each direction for its entire length, and has a maximum speed limit of 100 km/h (62 mph).

== Exit list ==
Location	km	mi	Exit	Name	Destinations	Notes
Shanghai S5 (Shanghai–Jiading Expressway)
Baoshan District, Shanghai	0	0		Middle Ring Hujia Interchange	Middle Ring Road	
Baoshan District, Shanghai			11	Zhenbei Road; Wenshui Road		
Putuo District, Shanghai			13	Taopu	Qilianshan Road	Eastbound exit and westbound entrance only
Putuo District, Shanghai			15	Outer Ring Hujia Interchange	Shanghai S20	
Jiading District, Shanghai			18	Nanxiang	Fengxiang Road	
Jiading District, Shanghai			23/24	Malu	Shanghai S322 (Bao'an Highway)	
Jiading District, Shanghai			28	Jiading Nanmen Interchange	G1503	
Jiading District, Shanghai				Jiading City Center	South Bo'le Road; Yecheng Road	
Closed/former; Concurrency terminus; HOV only; Incomplete access; Tolled; Route transition; Unopened
