= Jiangqiao, Shanghai =

Jiangqiao 江桥镇
- Town
- Location in Shanghai
- Coordinates: 31°15′16″N 121°20′30″E
- Country: People's Republic of China
- Municipality: Shanghai
- District: Jiading
- Elevation: 7 m (23 ft)
- Time zone: UTC+8 (China Standard)
- Postal code: 201803
- Area code: 0021

Jiangqiao (simplified Chinese: 江桥; traditional Chinese: 江橋; pinyin: Jiāngqiáo; Shanghainese: kaon^{1}jiau^{1}) is a town of Jiading District, Shanghai, located in the southeastern portion of the district immediately north of G2 Beijing–Shanghai Expressway and about 4 kilometres (2.5 mi) north of Shanghai Hongqiao International Airport. As of 2011, it has 19 residential communities (居委会) and 16 villages under its administration. It is the site of the non-passenger Jiangqiaozhen Station (zh:江桥镇站) on the Beijing–Shanghai Railway.

== See also ==
- List of township-level divisions of Shanghai
