= Yang Yongliang =

- 杨泳梁; 楊泳樑; yáng yǒngliáng
- Born: July 27, 1980 (age 46); Jiading, Shanghai, China
- Occupation: Artist
- Website: www.yangyongliang.com

Yang Yongliang (simplified Chinese: 杨泳梁; traditional Chinese: 楊泳樑; pinyin: yáng yǒngliáng; sometimes written Yang Yong-liang; born 1980 in Jiading, Shanghai) is a Chinese contemporary artist.

As a young student, he studied traditional Chinese painting and calligraphy before attending the Shanghai Art & Design Academy, where he specialized in decoration and design beginning in 1996. In 1999 he attended the China Academy of Art, Visual Communication Department, Shanghai branch. In 2005 he started his career as an artist with the stated goal of "creating new forms of contemporary art."

He currently lives and works in Shanghai.

== Selected exhibitions ==
- 2007: Art Now 2007 - International Residency Program, Gyeonggi Museum of Modern Art (South Korea)
- 2007: China Pingyao International Photography Festival, Pingyao County
- 2007: Phantom Landscape Series 2&3, OFOTO Gallery (Shanghai, China)
- 2007: Celebrating, Epson Imaging Gallery (Shanghai, China & Beijing, China)
- 2008: Stairway to Heaven: From Chinese Streets to Monument and Skyscraper, Bates College Museum of Art (Lewiston, Maine, US)
- 2008: Material Link – A Dialogue Between Greek and Chinese Artists, Museum of Contemporary Art Shanghai (Shanghai, China)
- 2008: Mixed Maze, Red Mansion Foundation (London, UK)
- 2008: Heavenly City & On the Quiet Water (Solo Exhibition), OFOTO Gallery (Shanghai, China)
- 2008: Collision Part II - TU LONG JI: Installation by Yang Yongliang, FQ Projects (Shanghai, China)
- 2008: Two Points:2008 Chinese Contemporary Art, Tolmezzo, Italy
- 2008: Shanghai Urban Public Space, HafenCity, Hamburg, Germany
- 2009: The Project Wall of H & R Block Artspace, Kansas City Art Institute (Kansas City, Missouri, US)
- 2009: 40th Anniversary of the Rencontres d'Arles, Rencontres d'Arles (Arles, France)
- 2009: 2nd Thessaloniki Biennale, Thessaloniki, Greece
- 2009: China Avant Garde - Landscape in Transit, LIMN Art Gallery (San Francisco, US)
- 2009: Yang Yongliang Solo Exhibition, LIMN Art Gallery (San Francisco, US)
- 2009: City of Phantom Visions, OFOTO Gallery (Shanghai, China)
- 2009: Drama/Stage, Urban Photography in Shanghai, Liu Haisu Art Museum (Shanghai, China)
- 2010: Views From China/Yang Yongliang and The Modern Metropolis, Nevada Museum of Art (Reno, Nevada, US)
- 2010: The Printed Image in China: from the 8th to the 21st Centuries, British Museum (London, UK)
- 2010: 《Post-tradition: the Magnified Slice》—Post Tradition: Forth Shanghai Duolun Exhibition of Young Artists, Shanghai DuoLun Museum of Modern Art (Shanghai, China)
- 2010: Heavenly City - Yang Yongliang Solo Exhibition, MC2 Gallery (Milan, Italy)
- 2010: Seoul International Photography Festival, Seoul, South Korea
- 2010: Artificial Wonderland: Yang Yongliang Solo Show, 18 Gallery (Shanghai, China)
- 2010: Artistic Conception 'Landscape' – Yang Yongliang Solo Exhibition, My Humble House Art Gallery (Taipei, Taiwan)
- 2010: Will to Height - Contemporary Art Exhibition, Epsite (Shanghai, China)
- 2010: Heavenly City, Paris-Beijing Photo Gallery Solo Show, Paris-Beijing Photo Gallery (Paris, France)
- 2011: Shan Shui – Poetry without Sound? Landscape in Chinese Contemporary Art Works from the Sigg Collection, Kunstmuseum Luzern (Switzerland)
- 2011: Metropolis - City Life in the Urban Age, Noorderlicht (Groningen, Netherlands)
- 2011: The Eye is a Lonely Hunter: Images of Humankind (The 4th Edition of the Fotofestival), Wilhelm-Hack Museum (Ludwigshafen, Germany)
- 2011: The Peach Colony - Yang Yongliang Solo Show, Paris-Beijing Photo Gallery (Beijing, China)
- 2011: The Peach Blossom Colony - Yang Yongliang Solo Show, 18 Gallery (Shanghai, China)
- 2011: Phantom Metropolis - Solo Exhibition by Yang Yongliang, Schoeni Art Gallery (Hong Kong)
- 2011: The End of the Brush and Ink Era: Chinese Landscape, True Color Museum (Suzhou, China)
- 2012: The Printed Image in China: from the 8th to the 21st Centuries, Metropolitan Museum of Art (New York City, US)
- 2012: One Hundred Flowers, Art Gallery of New South Wales (Sydney, Australia)
- 2012: Timer Catcher, National Gallery of Victoria (Melbourne, Australia)
- 2012: Babel, Palais des Beaux-Arts de Lille (France)
- 2012: The Creators Project: Beijing 2012 Meet the Creators, Ullens Center for Contemporary Art (China)
- 2012: Latitude/Attitude, Schoeni Art Gallery (Hong Kong)
- 2012: Moonlight, MD gallery (Shanghai, China)
- 2012: Conceptual Renewal - Short History of Chinese Contemporary Photographical Art, Si Shang Art Museum (Beijing, China)
- 2012: The Peach Colony (Solo Show), LIMN Art Gallery (San Francisco, US)
- 2012: A Sprinkle of Salt - Exhibition of Shi Zhiying/Yang Yongliang, MOT ARTS (Taipei, Taiwan)
- 2013: Moonlit Metropolis (Solo Exhibition), Schoeni Art Gallery (Hong Kong)
- 2013: The Silent Valley, Galerie Paris-Beijing (Paris, France)
- 2013: Silent Valley, MC2 Gallery (Milan, Italy)
- 2013: Landmark: the Fields of Photography, Somerset House (London, UK)
- 2013: Dreamers, Palazzo Tagliaferro Contemporary Culture Center (Milan, Italy)
- 2013: City in Picture, Picture of a City, Stedelijk Museum Zwolle (Zwolle, Netherlands)
- 2013: China Has Awakened..., Contemporary Art Space of Thonon-les-bains (Thonon-les-Bains, France)
- 2013: European Media Art Festival 2013 - Art Box, City Library of Osnabrueck (Osnabrueck, Germany)
- 2013: New Ink - An Exhibition of Ink Art by Post 1970 Artists from the Yiqingzhai Collection, Sotheby's Hong Kong Gallery (Hong Kong)
- 2013: How Far Away is the Horizon?, Copenhagen (Copenhagen, Denmark)
- 2013: DE LEUR TEMPS, Banana Hangar Nantes Art Centre (Nantes, France)
- 2013: Seven Sunsets, Waiting Dawns, All in One. How to Kill a Wondrous Time... Not Waiting a Thousand Hours, Shanghai Gallery of Art (Shanghai, China)
- 2013: Ink Art: Past as Present in Contemporary China, Metropolitan Museum of Art (New York City, US)
- 2014: Outside the Lines: New Art from China, RH Contemporary Art Gallery (New York City, US)
- 2014: Yang Yongliang-Solo Exhibition, Sophie Maree Gallery (The Hague, Netherlands)
- 2015: 2050. A Brief History of the Future, Royal Museums of Fine Arts of Belgium (Brussels, Belgium), Louvre (Paris, France)
- 2015: Ink Remix: Contemporary Art from Mainland China, Hong Kong and Taiwan, Canberra Museum and Gallery (Canberra, Australia)
- 2021: Journey to the Dark II, Fotografiska Stockholm, Sweden

== Selected collections ==
- British Museum (London, UK)
- National Gallery of Victoria (Melbourne, Australia)
- Nevada Museum of Art (Reno, Nevada, US)
- Jordan Schnitzer Museum of Art (Eugene, Oregon, US)
- Art Gallery of New South Wales (Sydney, Australia)
- Samuel P. Harn Museum of Art (Gainesville, Florida, US)
- Bibliothèque nationale de France (Paris, France)
- White Rabbit Gallery (Sydney, Australia)

== Awards ==
- 2009: Cannes Lions (Silver Award)
- 2009: New York Festivals (Gold World Medal)
- 2009: London International Awards (Gold Winner)
- 2009: 40th International Festival of Photography in Arles (Nominated to Discovery Awards)
- 2010: Clio Awards (Silver Award)
- 2010: The Sovereign Asian Art Prize (One of the Top 30 Finalist)
- 2015: The Sixth Prix Pictet, Disorder (One of the Twelve Photographers)

== Bibliography ==
- Yang, Yongliang (2006). Grand Church. China Machine Press. ISBN 978-7111177005.
- Yang, Yongliang (2011). Paysages. Paris Beijing. ISBN 979-1090176034.
- Yang, Yongliang; Rosenberg, David (2012). New Landscapes (Chinese Contemporary Photography). Thircuir. ISBN 978-9881992444.
- Yang, Yongliang; Rosenberg, David; Bartz, Thomas (2012). Paysages. Thircuir. ISBN 978-9881992499.
