= Jiadingzhen Subdistrict =

Subdistrict in Shanghai, China

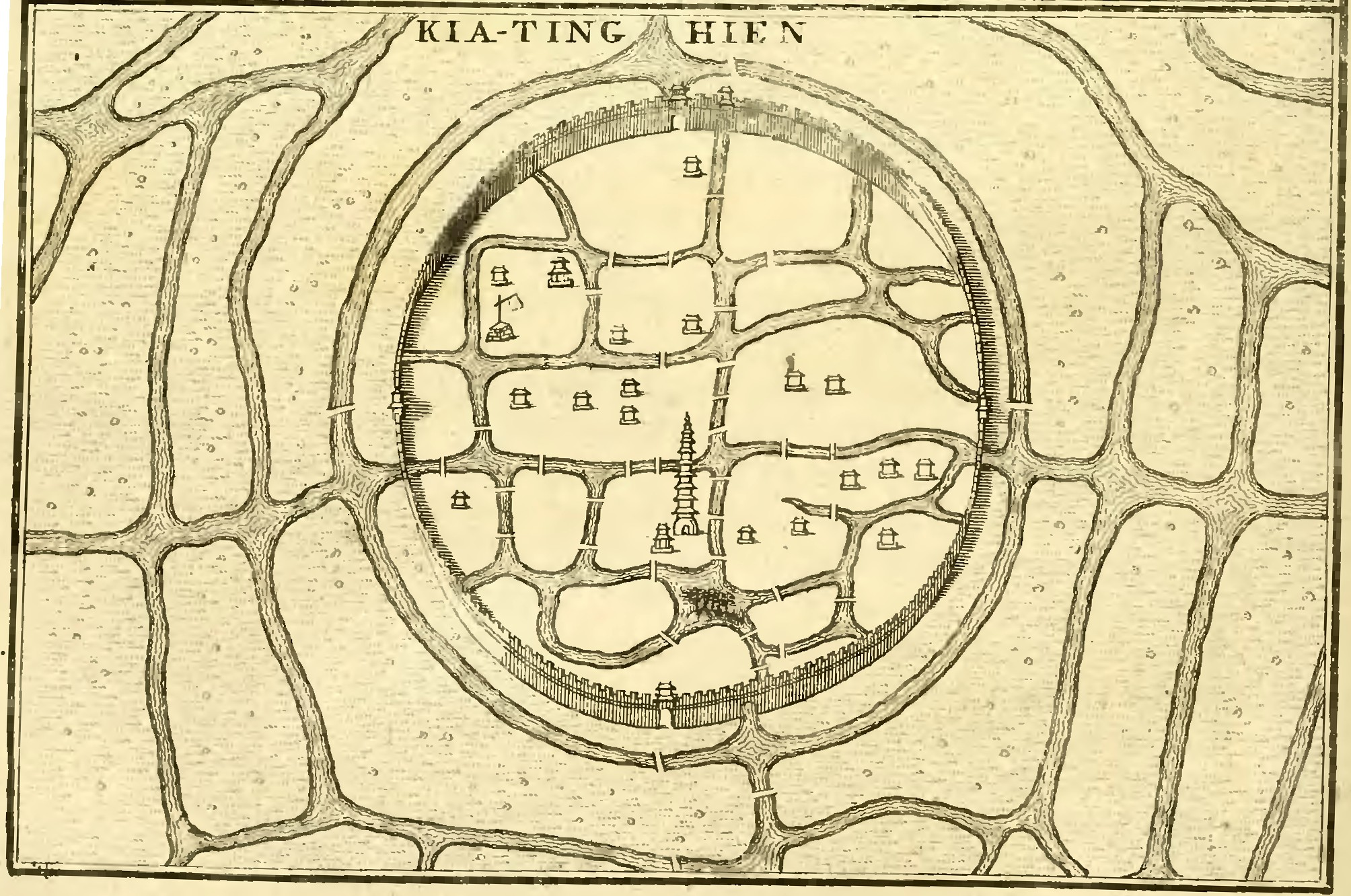
Map of Jiading taken from Jean-Baptiste Du Halde's Description de la Chine, vol 1, 1736

Jiadingzhen (Chinese: 嘉定镇; pinyin: Jiādìngzhèn), literally Jiading Town, is a subdistrict and former town in Jiading District, Shanghai, China. It is the historical center of Jiading, which was a separate city from Shanghai until the 1950s.

== Flood of 1786 ==
There was a flood in 1786:

"the fall of a cliff in the Ta Tu dammed the river completely for a time. Warnings were sent to the villages along the banks, and many fled to the hills, but the people of Chia-ting, trusting to their open plain over which the water could spread itself, scouted the warning, and the cry, "Shui lai-la" ("The water is coming"), became the catchword of the hour. Let Baber tell the rest: "It was holiday in Chia-ting some days after the receipt of the notice, and the light hearted crowds which gathered on such occasions were chiefly attracted by a theatrical representation on the flat by the water-side. One of the actors suddenly stopped in the middle of his rôle, and gazing up the river, screamed out the now familiar by-word, 'Shui lai-la!' This repetition of the stock jest, with well-simulated terror, as it seemed to the merry-makers, drew shouts of laughter; but the echoes of the laugh were drowned in the roar of a deluge. I was told how the gleeful faces turned to horror as the flood swept on like a moving wall, and overwhelmed twelve thousand souls."

== See also ==
- List of township-level divisions of Shanghai
