= Huating, Shanghai =

Town in Jiading, Shanghai, China

Huating 华亭镇
- Town
- Location in Shanghai
- Coordinates: 31.467874°N 121.283784°E
- Country: People's Republic of China
- Municipality: Shanghai
- District: Jiading
- Time zone: UTC+8 (China Standard)

Huating (simplified Chinese: 华亭; traditional Chinese: 華亭; pinyin: Huátíng) is a town under the district of Jiading in Shanghai, China. Huating has an estimated population of 24,529 in 2007.

== Geography ==
Huating is located to the north west of Shanghai, bordering Liuhe Town of Taicang County Jiangsu province. Huating is around 30 km from downtown Shanghai. Huating has an area of around 39.5 km^{2}. Huating has rich soils and abundant fresh water supply from the river system. These natural resources make Huating a rich land where everything grows, from staple food such as rice, wheat, oats to specialty plants and vegetables very local. The weather is mild and wet, with a lot of rain in summer which tends to be very hot and humid.

== Administration ==
Huating has eleven administrative villages including Yuanjiaqiao (袁家桥, Xinyuan (新园), Lianyi (联一), Lianhua (联华), Liansan (联三), Beixin (北新), Huating (华亭), Jinlu (金吕), Taqiao (塔桥), Liangjun (连俊), Shuangtang (双塘) and Maoqiao (毛桥).

Huating today is the result of a merger of two towns (Huating and Tanghang 唐行) back in 2001, as part of the Jiading restructuring program. Huating local people sometimes refer to Huating as "Yuan Jia Qiao" (袁家桥)

Huating's postal zip code is 201811. Telephone area code is (021) 599.

== Economy ==
Huating has an industrial focus on modern agriculture and related tourism that are environmentally friendly, healthy and sustainable. The "Huating Home" (华亭人家) which is part of the larger Jiading Modern Agriculture district is located in Huating. It has a multitude of activities including log cabin fishing, fruit picking, tea tasting, local food dining, kite flying, farm produce shopping and lodging that bring visitors from Shanghai and nearby locations for short outings or excursions. The address is 518 Shuangzhu Rd Huating, Jiading District, Shanghai 201811. You can view "Huating Home" from the Google satellite map at . Huating, among other towns in Jiading, produces very good quality garlic that is exported to many countries of the world. Garlic is an influential plant that provides three rounds of harvest to locals: young garlic sprout, garlic flower stem and garlic itself. All three are great food or seasoning ingredients. Other major plants grown include rice and wheat. Vegetable oil plants and cottons have basically disappeared. Instead, there are now many fields where fruits or other high-yielding plants or trees are grown.

The Huating Cemetery (华亭息园) is a known cemetery for people from around Shanghai to lay their loved ones remains to rest.

Huating also has manufacturing and retail sectors. Most manufacturing is labor-intensive rather than technology intensive. Retail businesses are mostly for selling household stuff such as salt, sugar and grocery. There are a few supermarket stores in Huating "downtown" area including Lianghua and Hualiang. There is a farmer's market in downtown Huating where local farmers and merchants trade.

== Lifestyle and Customs ==
Huating locals speak the Huating dialect, which has similarities to the Shanghai dialect with slangs and variances of pronunciations that are different from Shanghai dialect. The net effect is that it is easier for people from the neighbouring Liuhe town in Jiangsu province to understand someone from Huating, than for people who speak idiomatic Shanghai dialect to understand the same person.

== Schools ==
Huating used to have two middle schools. One is Huating Middle School (华亭中学). The other was Tanqiao Middle School. There were many primary schools. Usually each village had at least one primary school named after the village or a landmark near the school. Most Huating local kids went to school from their neighbourhood primary school, then moving onto the Huating middle school and eventually moving out of town to attend high school or vocational schools. This is how most local kids realized their dreams of high education that their parents never dreamed of. Over the past ten years, there have been many "mergers and acquisitions" among schools. Many traditional village level schools disappeared. Instead, resources are pooled into larger schools with more facilities and resources. Most primary and middle school students go to one school at the town level now. This is Huating Central Primary School for elementary education or Huating Middle School for middle school education. Students go to High School out of Town in Jiading or further away in Shanghai.

== Food and Specialities ==
Huating used to make very famous straw knitted handcrafts such as braids or weed hats and bags. There are several local dishes or food recipes that are well known by the locals. One example is Caotou Tabing (草头塌饼) a vegetable pancake made of sticky rice. However, it is not certain whether this is local to Huating or not. Traditionally, Huating people, among others in the region would steam Chinese annual cake (年糕) to celebrate the Chinese New Year. Many families would spend a night preparing it. However, in recent years, this tradition ceased for many homes because of the variety of other foods for people.

Huating, among other localities in Shanghai, also produces something called "Lu Shu" as the locals name it or "Tian Gan" (甜杆) as people from North China call it. This plant is similar to sugar cane, but has medical benefits in terms of comforting the stomach and facilitating digestion. Almost all local people grow it in the margins of their farmland and it becomes one of the most popular local snack for the young and old alike.

== See also ==
- List of township-level divisions of Shanghai
