= Malu, Shanghai =

Town in Jiading District, Shanghai, China

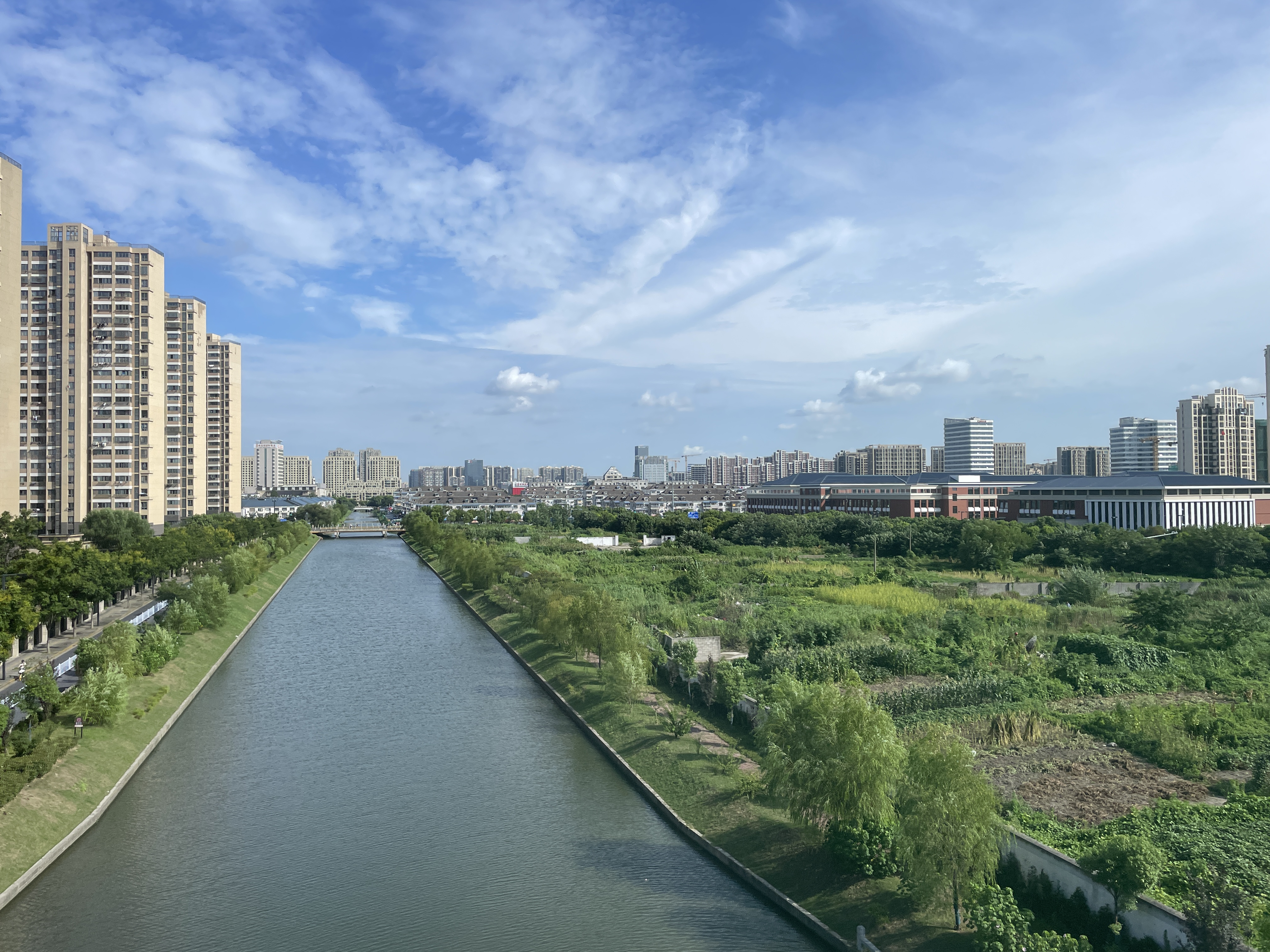
Town Overview

Malu (Chinese: 马陆镇) is a suburban town in Jiading District, a suburban district of Shanghai, China. Its population is about 51,000.

Due to its location, Malu Town has been able to excel in many industries such as electronics, fashion design, machinery, pharmaceuticals, and food production. As of the 21st century, world standard infrastructure and quality auxiliary facilities provide a good environment for investors from around the world.

== See also ==
- List of township-level divisions of Shanghai
