= Jiading, Shanghai =

Jiading 嘉定区; 嘉定區 Kiating
- District
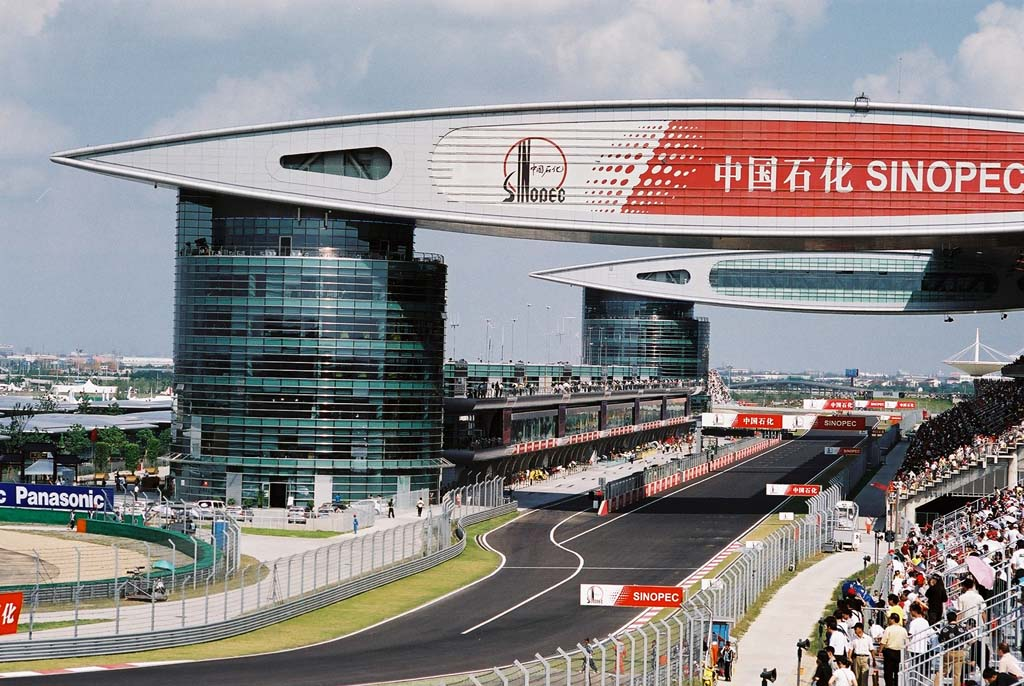
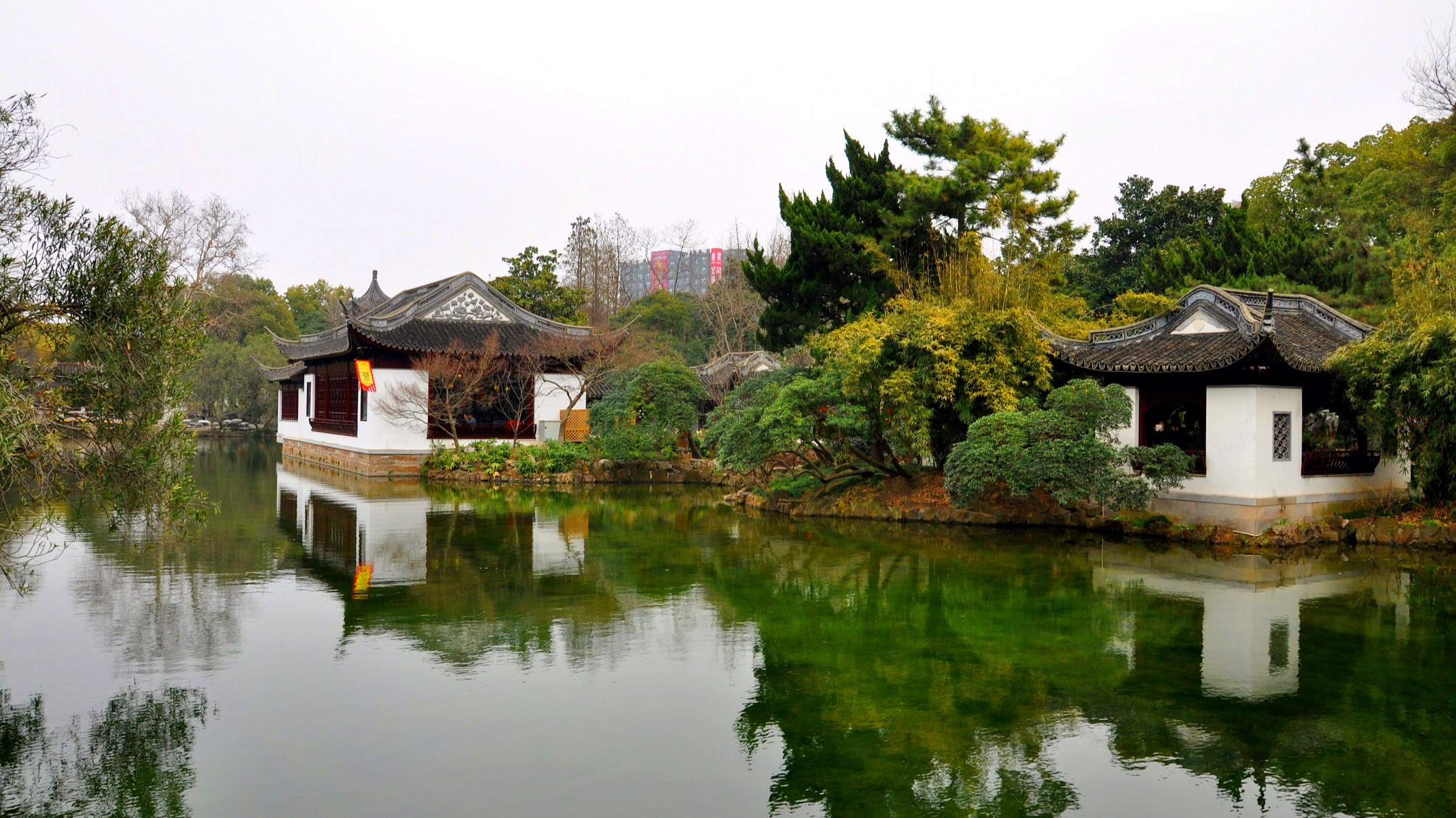
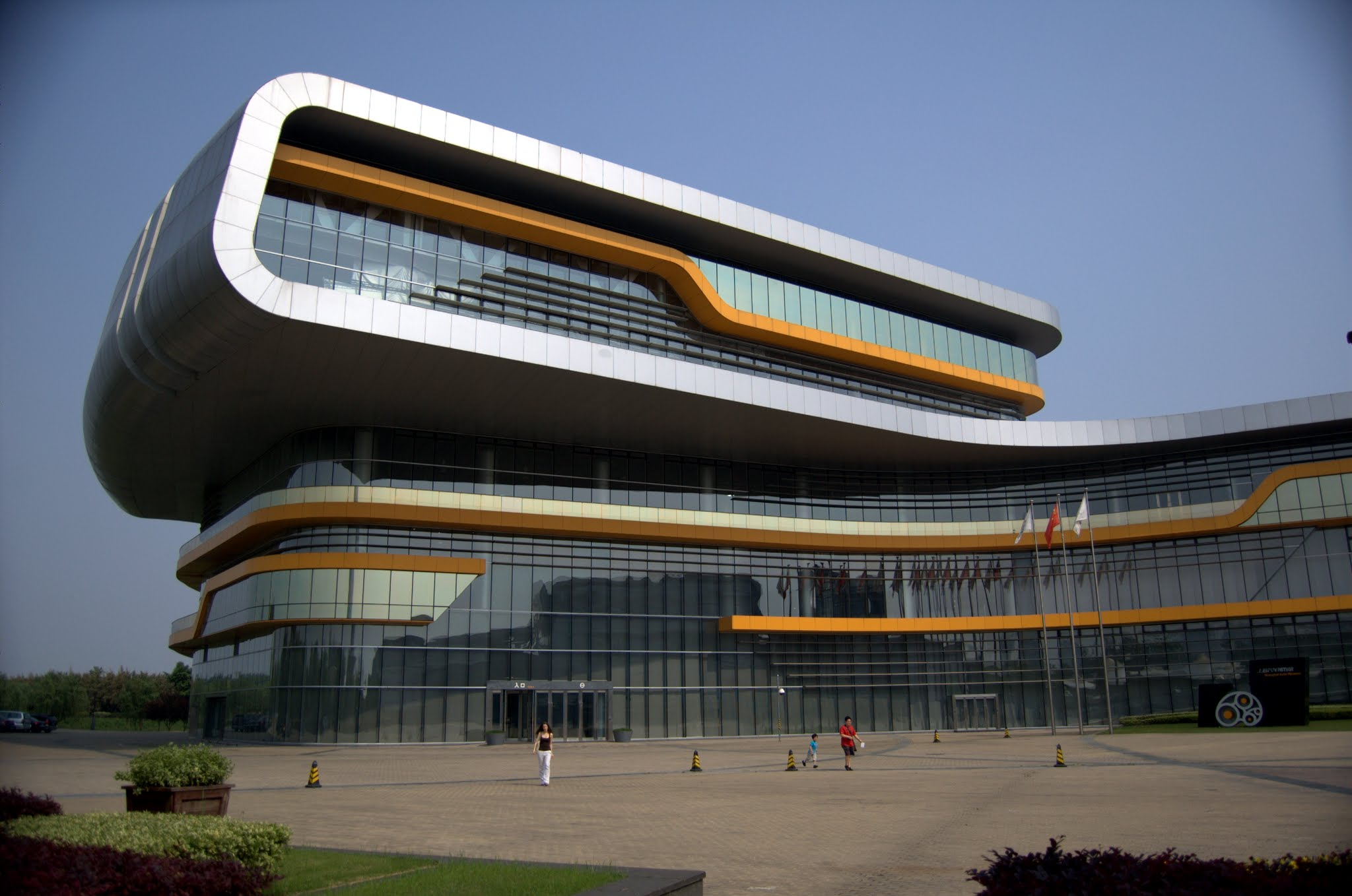
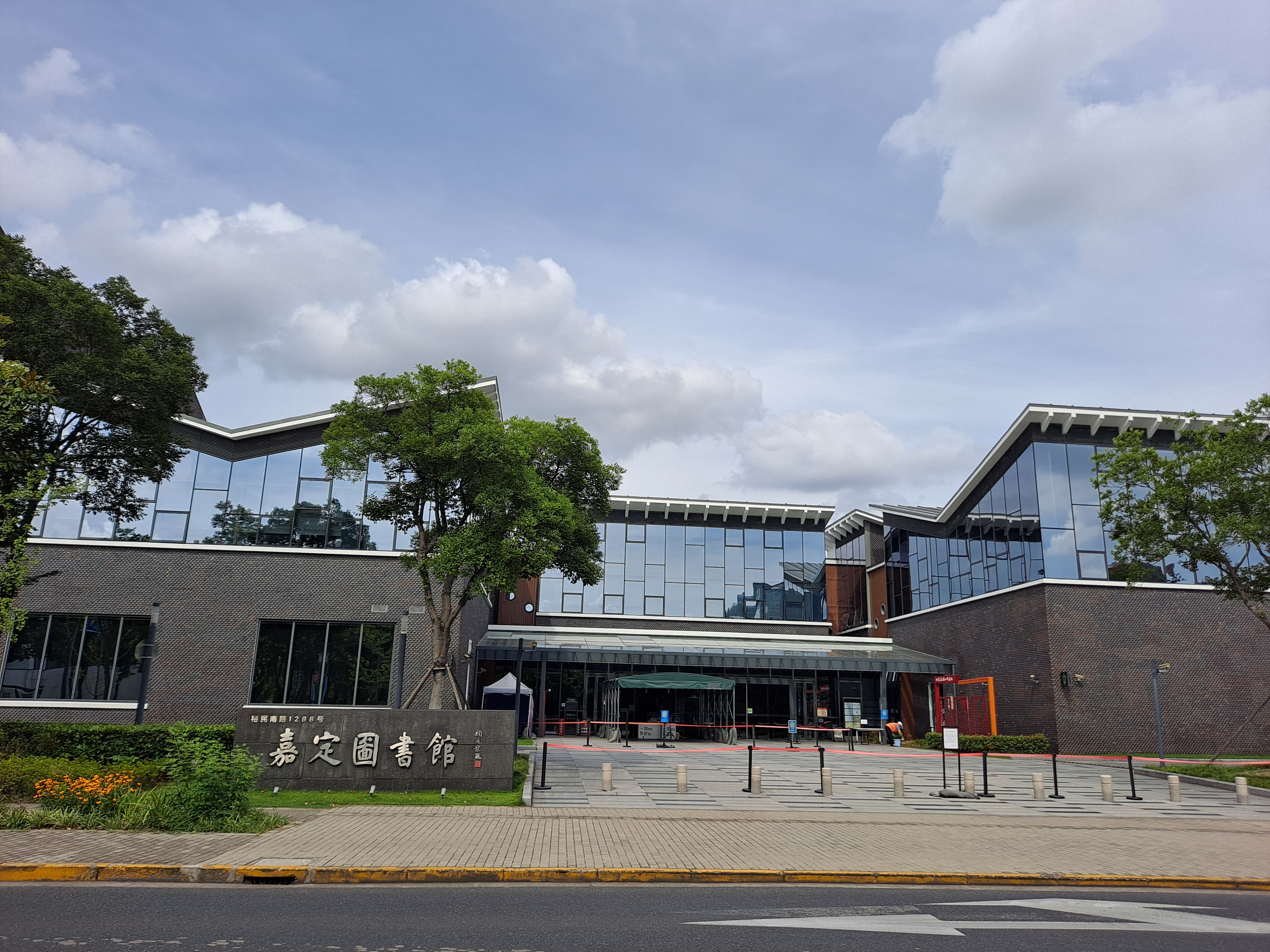
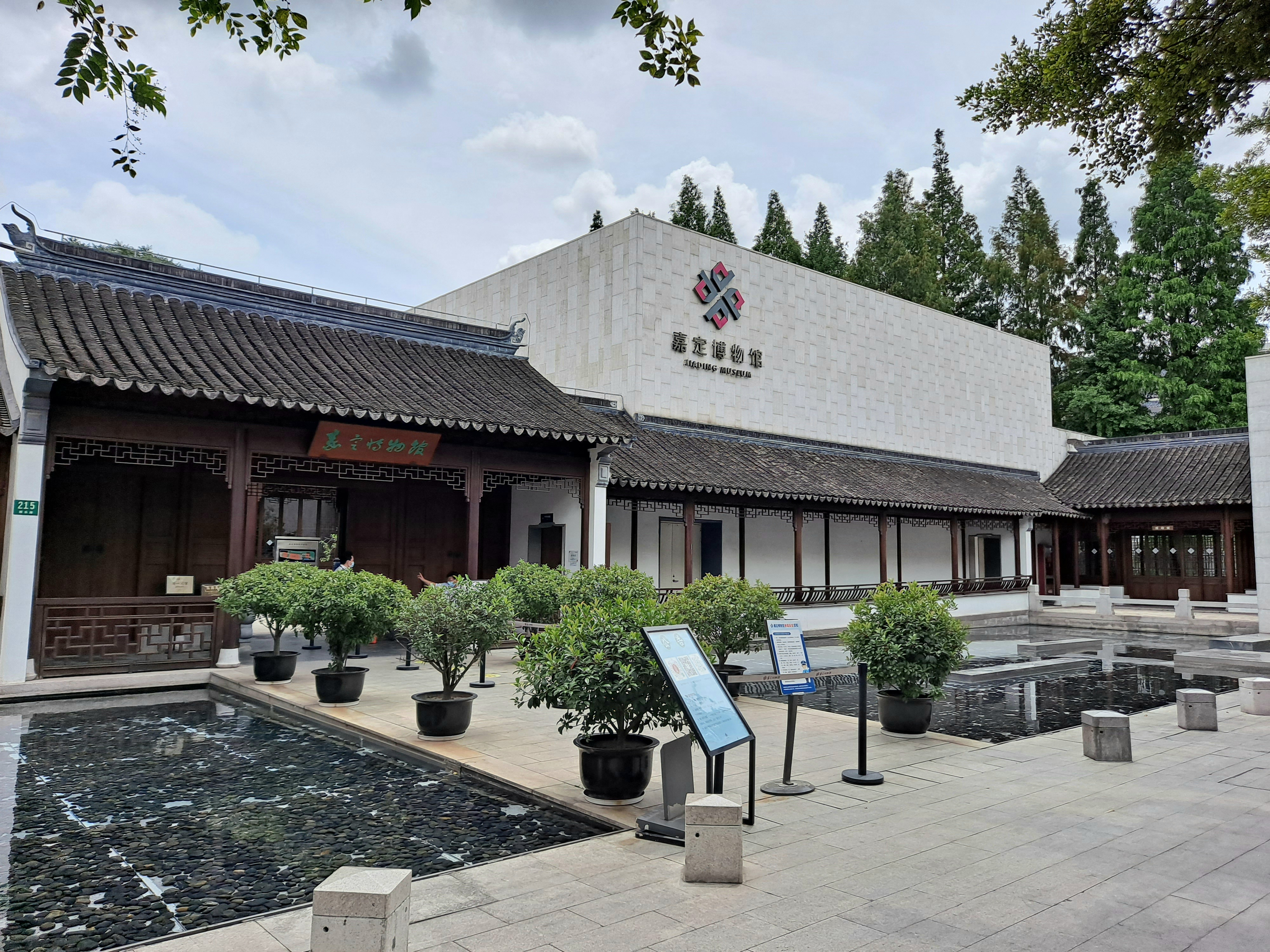
- Shanghai International Circuit Guyi Garden in Nanxiang Shanghai Auto Museum Jiading Library Jiading Museum

- Jiading in Shanghai
- Interactive map of Jiading
- Coordinates: 31°20′14.81″N 121°14′00.93″E
- Country: China
- Municipality: Shanghai

Area
  - Total: 463.55 km^{2} (178.98 sq mi)

Population (2020 Census)
  - Total: 1,834,258
  - Density: 3,957.0/km^{2} (10,249/sq mi)
- Time zone: UTC+8 (China Standard)

Jiading, Shanghai
- Simplified Chinese: 嘉定区
- Traditional Chinese: 嘉定區
- Wugniu: ka^{1} din^{6} chiu^{1}
- Postal: Kating
Transcriptions
Standard Mandarin
- Hanyu Pinyin: Jiādìng qū
- Wade–Giles: Chia^{1}-ting^{4} Ch'ü^{1}
Wu
- Wugniu: ka^{1} din^{6} chiu^{1}
- IPA: Shanghainese: [ka˥ din˧ tɕʰy˨]
Yue: Cantonese
- Jyutping: gaa^{1} ding^{6} keoi^{1}

Jiading is a suburban district of Shanghai. As of the 2020 Chinese census, it had a population of 1,834,258.

== History ==
Jiading was historically a separate polity from Shanghai until it came under the administration of Shanghai in 1958. In 1993, Jiading's designation was changed from a county to a district within Shanghai.

During the early Qing dynasty, which overlapped with the Southern Ming, the municipality was infamous for the "Jiading Massacre" carried out by invading Qing forces led by the general Li Chengdong, who had defected from the bandits. Jiading was also known for banditry: in a 1853 rebellion caused by taxation, bandits captured the city and then Shanghai.

In 2005, the Jiading district government invested CN¥10 million to build the Shanghai Museum of the Imperial Examination System.

== Geography ==
Jiading district is located in the northwestern part of Shanghai. It stretches across 463.9 km^{2} (179.1 sq mi). It is located about 20 km (12 mi) from downtown Shanghai.

=== Climate ===
Jiading has a humid subtropical climate (Köppen climate classification Cfa). The average annual temperature in Jiading is 16.3 °C (61.3 °F). The average annual rainfall is 1,139.8 mm (44.87 in) with July as the wettest month. The temperatures are highest on average in July, at around 28.2 °C (82.8 °F), and lowest in January, at around 4.0 °C (39.2 °F).

Climate data for Jiading District, elevation 7 m (23 ft), (1991–2020 normals, extremes 1951–present)
Month	Jan	Feb	Mar	Apr	May	Jun	Jul	Aug	Sep	Oct	Nov	Dec	Year
Record high °C (°F)	22.3 (72.1)	26.4 (79.5)	32.9 (91.2)	33.3 (91.9)	37.6 (99.7)	37.0 (98.6)	40.0 (104.0)	40.5 (104.9)	37.5 (99.5)	36.4 (97.5)	29.4 (84.9)	23.9 (75.0)	40.5 (104.9)
Mean daily maximum °C (°F)	8.3 (46.9)	10.4 (50.7)	14.6 (58.3)	20.6 (69.1)	25.7 (78.3)	28.4 (83.1)	32.7 (90.9)	32.2 (90.0)	28.2 (82.8)	23.2 (73.8)	17.6 (63.7)	11.1 (52.0)	21.1 (70.0)
Daily mean °C (°F)	4.5 (40.1)	6.3 (43.3)	10.2 (50.4)	15.7 (60.3)	21.0 (69.8)	24.5 (76.1)	28.7 (83.7)	28.4 (83.1)	24.5 (76.1)	19.2 (66.6)	13.4 (56.1)	7.0 (44.6)	17.0 (62.5)
Mean daily minimum °C (°F)	1.6 (34.9)	3.0 (37.4)	6.7 (44.1)	11.8 (53.2)	17.2 (63.0)	21.4 (70.5)	25.6 (78.1)	25.6 (78.1)	21.6 (70.9)	15.8 (60.4)	9.9 (49.8)	3.8 (38.8)	13.7 (56.6)
Record low °C (°F)	−10.0 (14.0)	−8.1 (17.4)	−4.6 (23.7)	−1.0 (30.2)	5.4 (41.7)	12.1 (53.8)	16.0 (60.8)	17.7 (63.9)	11.2 (52.2)	0.9 (33.6)	−3.7 (25.3)	−9.0 (15.8)	−10.0 (14.0)
Average precipitation mm (inches)	69.3 (2.73)	62.9 (2.48)	86.7 (3.41)	77.3 (3.04)	88.6 (3.49)	192.8 (7.59)	149.5 (5.89)	208.2 (8.20)	102.2 (4.02)	69.7 (2.74)	54.3 (2.14)	46.1 (1.81)	1,207.6 (47.54)
Average precipitation days (≥ 0.1 mm)	10.3	10.0	12.1	11.0	11.2	13.6	12.3	12.3	9.1	7.4	9.0	8.1	126.4
Average snowy days	2.1	1.5	0.4	0	0	0	0	0	0	0	0.1	0.8	4.9
Average relative humidity (%)	75	74	73	71	72	79	78	78	77	74	75	73	75
Mean monthly sunshine hours	106.0	112.0	135.0	158.1	168.8	119.6	190.7	189.7	161.5	154.3	125.3	122.0	1,743
Percentage possible sunshine	33	36	36	41	40	28	44	47	44	44	40	39	39
Source: China Meteorological Administration All-time September high

== Administration ==
Jiading District administers several subdistricts towns, including Jiading, Anting, Nanxiang, Huating, Xuhang, Waigang, Huangdu, Malu and Jiangqiao.

=== Subdistricts and towns ===
Name	Chinese (S)	Hanyu Pinyin	Shanghainese Romanization	Population (2010)	Area (km^{2})
Xincheng Road Subdistrict	新成路街道	Xīnchénglù Jiēdào	sin zen lu ka do	55,223	5.14
Zhenxin Subdistrict	真新街道	Zhēnxīn Jiēdào	tzen sin ka do	106,164	5.09
Jiadingzhen Subdistrict	嘉定镇街道	Jiādìngzhèn Jiēdào	ka din tzen ka do	81,854	4.10
Nanxiang town	南翔镇	Nánxiáng Zhèn	neu zian tzen	139,845	33.31
Anting town	安亭镇	Āntíng Zhèn	eu din tzen	232,503	89.29
Malu town	马陆镇	Mǎlù Zhèn	mau loq tzen	172,864	57.16
Xuhang town	徐行镇	Xúháng Zhèn	zi raon tzen	165,452	39.91
Huating town	华亭镇	Huátíng Zhèn	rau din tzen	46,355	39.57
Waigang town	外冈镇	Wàigāng Zhèn	nga kaon tzen	80,896	50.95
Jiangqiao town	江桥镇	jiāng qiáo Zhèn	kaon djio tzen	256,218	42.37
Jiading Industrial Zone	嘉定工业区	Jiādìng Gōngyèqū	ka din kon gniq chiu	72,933	78.10
Juyuan New Area Administrative Committee	菊园新区管委会	Yúyuán Xīnqū Guǎn Wěihuì	cioq yeu sin chiu kueu we	60,924	18.61

== Landmarks ==
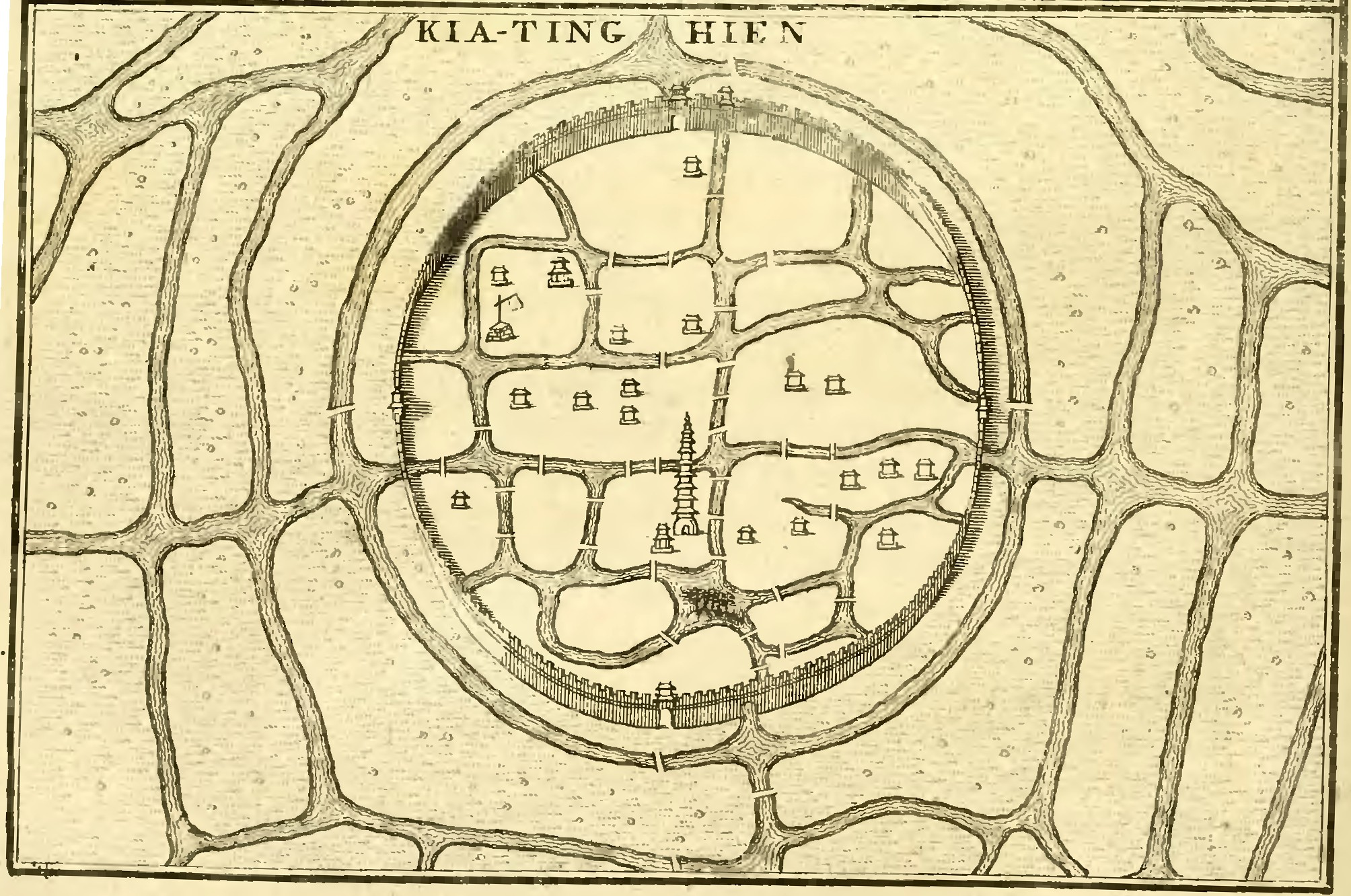
A map of "Kia-ting-hien" from Du Halde's 1735 Description of China, based on accounts by Jesuit missionaries

Shanghai University has a campus in downtown Jiading, which is where SILC is based.

The Shanghai International Circuit is located in Jiading. Each year in April, the Shanghai International Circuit holds the Chinese Grand Prix.

== Economy ==
The hotel company H World Group Limited has its headquarters in Jiading.

== Sports ==
Shanghai Jiading F.C. is the district's local soccer club.

== Accommodation ==
There are numerous international hotels within the Jiading district. Among the most famous are Sheraton Shanghai Jiading Hotel and the Crowne Plaza Shanghai Anting, the latter one being the first five star international hotel in Jiading.

== Notable people ==
- Yang Yongliang (born 1980), artist
- James S. C. Chao (born c. 1927), merchant mariner, business leader, and philanthropist
- Wellington Koo (born c. 1888), a Chinese statesman of the Republic of China.

== Transportation ==
=== Highways ===
Jiading district is connected to downtown Shanghai by the Hujia Expressway, the first expressway in China. Jiading district is near Shanghai's Hongqiao Airport, but across town from Pudong International Airport.

=== Metro ===
Jiading is currently served by three metro lines operated by Shanghai Metro:

- Line 11 - Nanxiang, Malu, Jiading Xincheng, Baiyin Road, West Jiading, North Jiading / Shanghai Circuit, East Changji Road, Shanghai Automobile City, Anting
- Line 13 - Jinyun Road, West Jinshajiang Road, Fengzhuang
- Line 14 - Fengbang, Lexiu Road, Lintao Road, Jiayi Road, Dingbian Road, Zhenxin Xincun
