= Songjiang, Shanghai =

Coordinates: 31°00′21″N 121°14′00″E

Songjiang 松江区; 松江區
- District
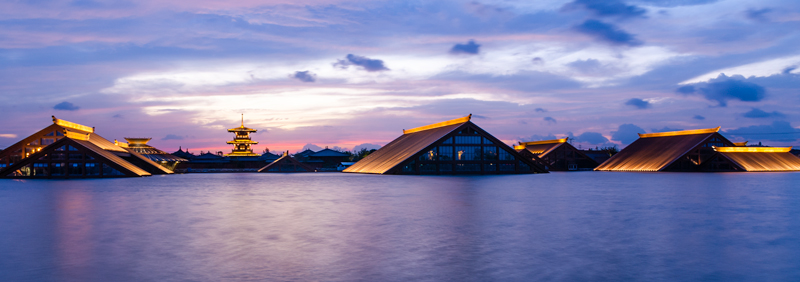
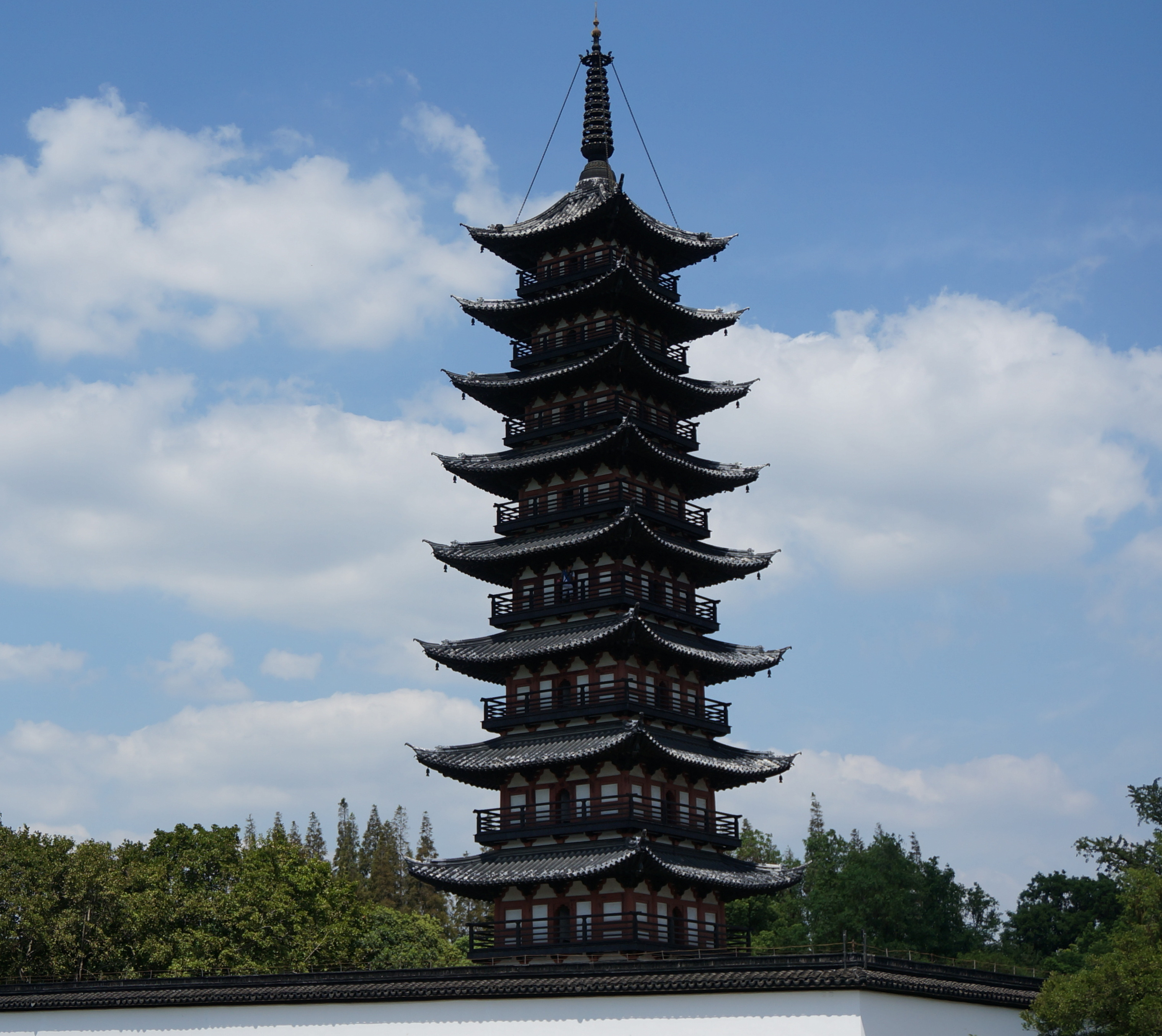
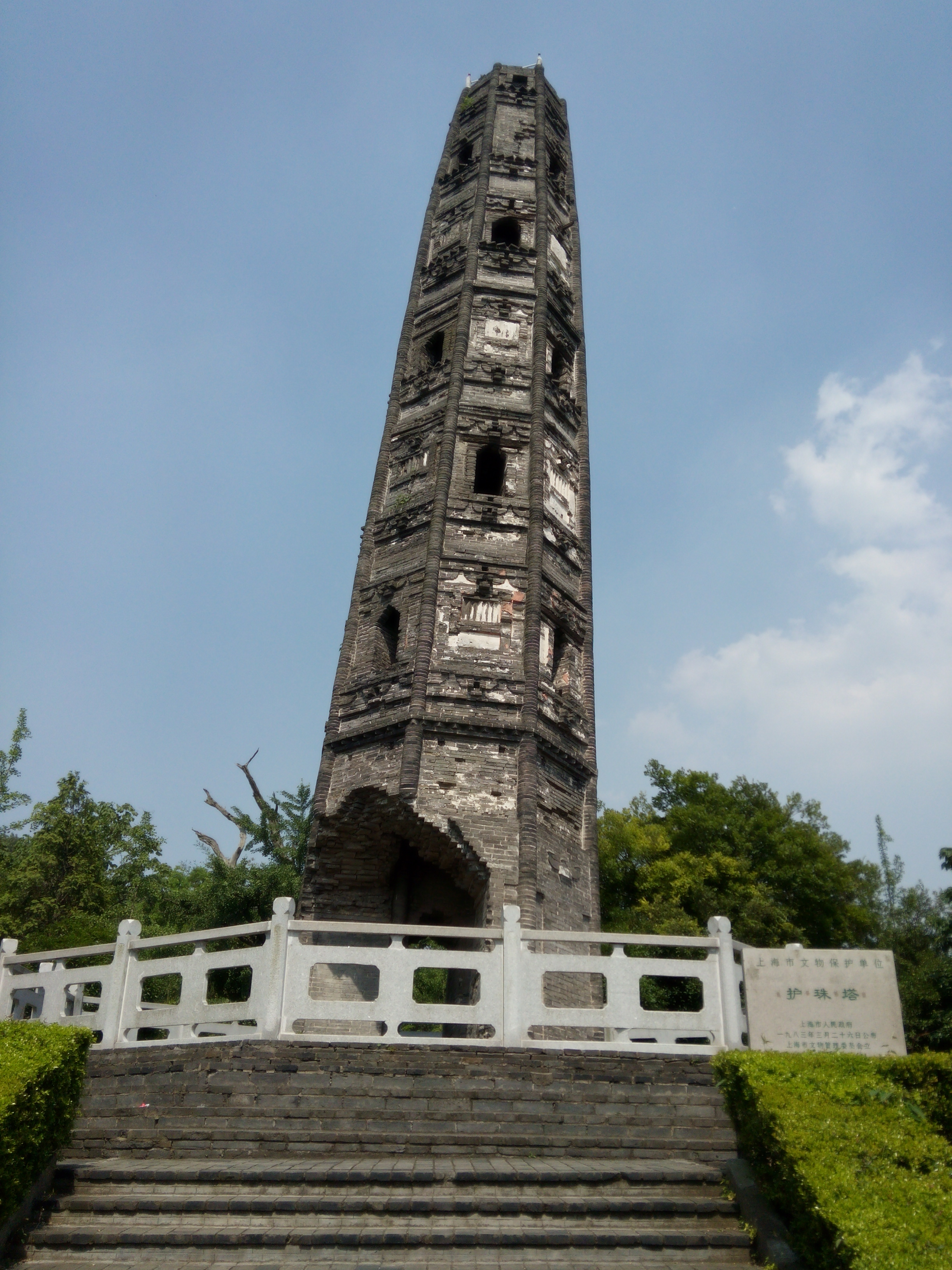
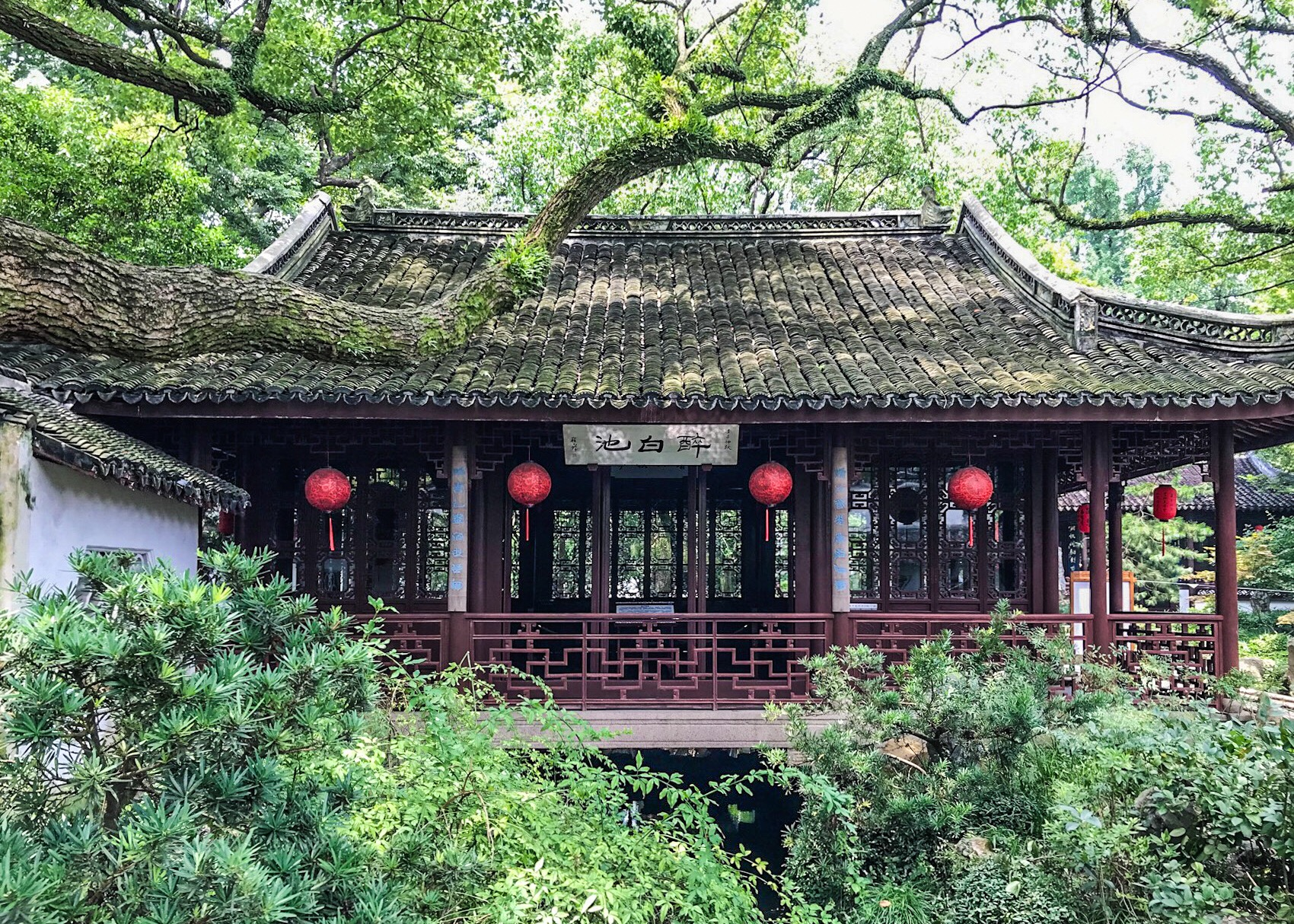
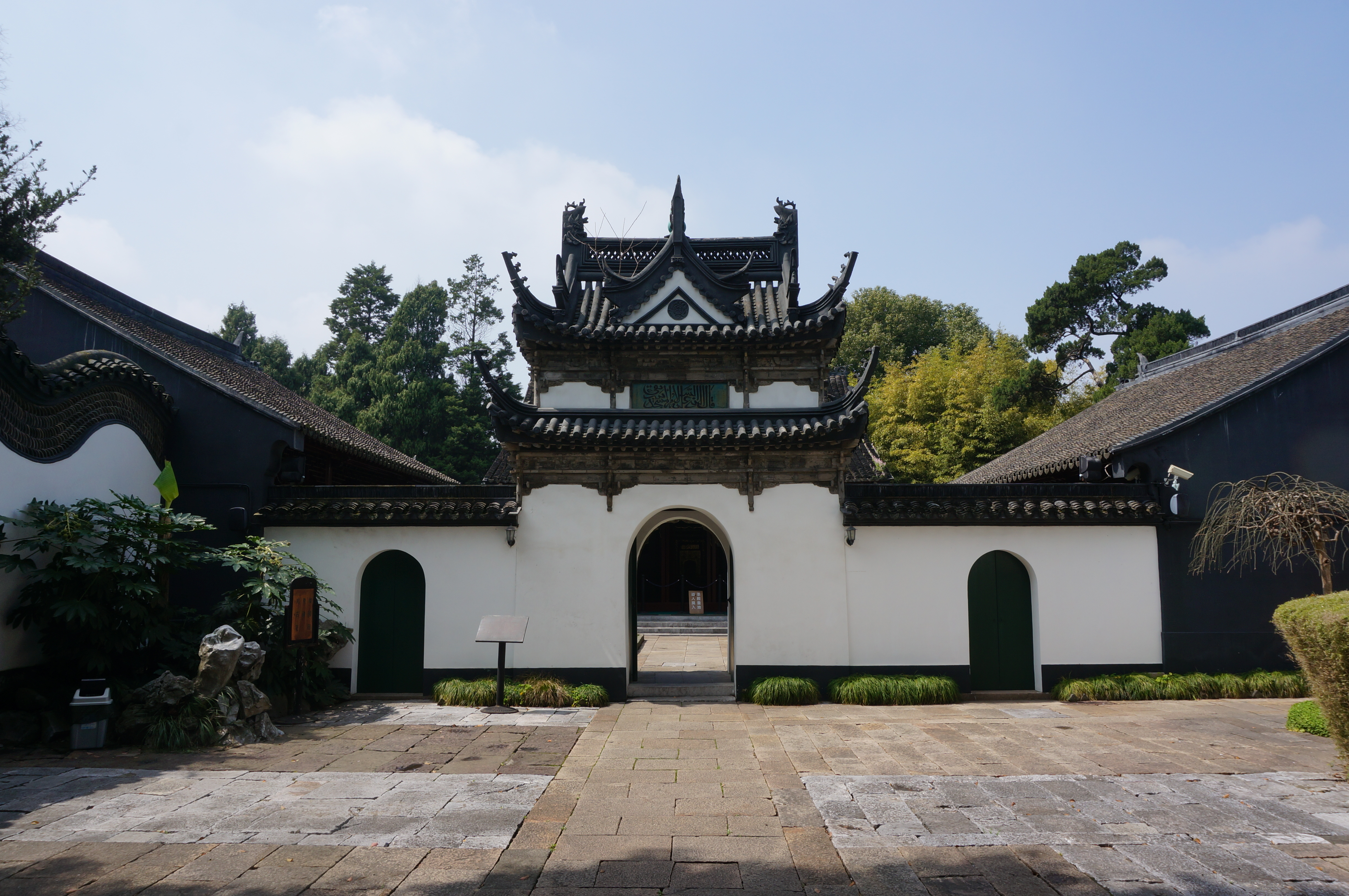
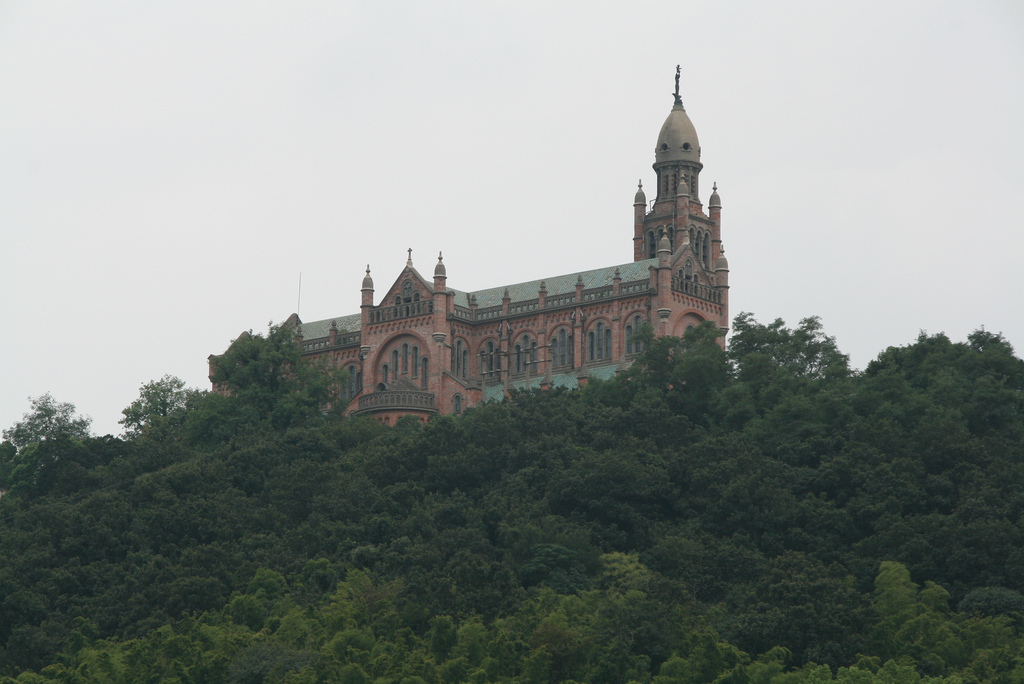
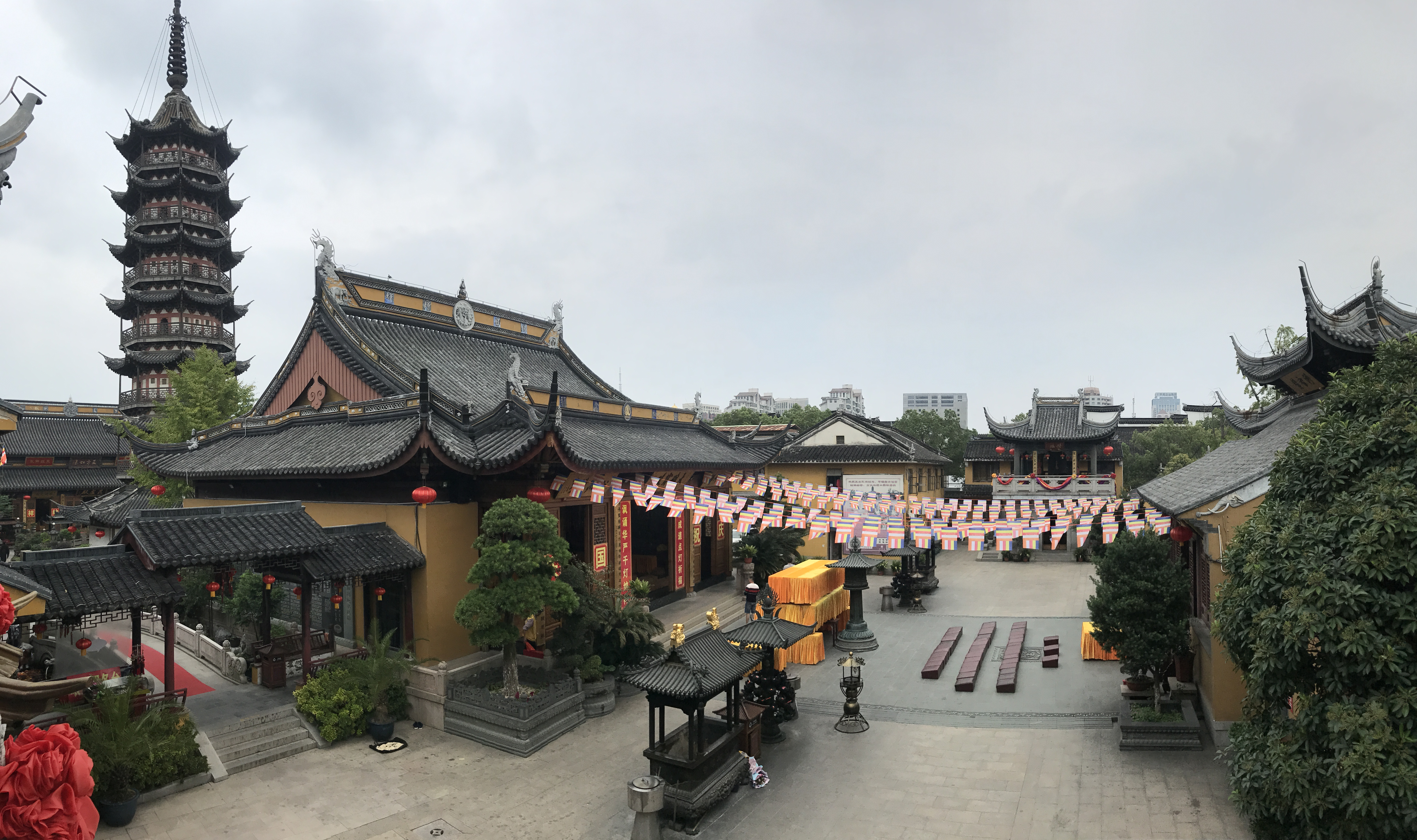
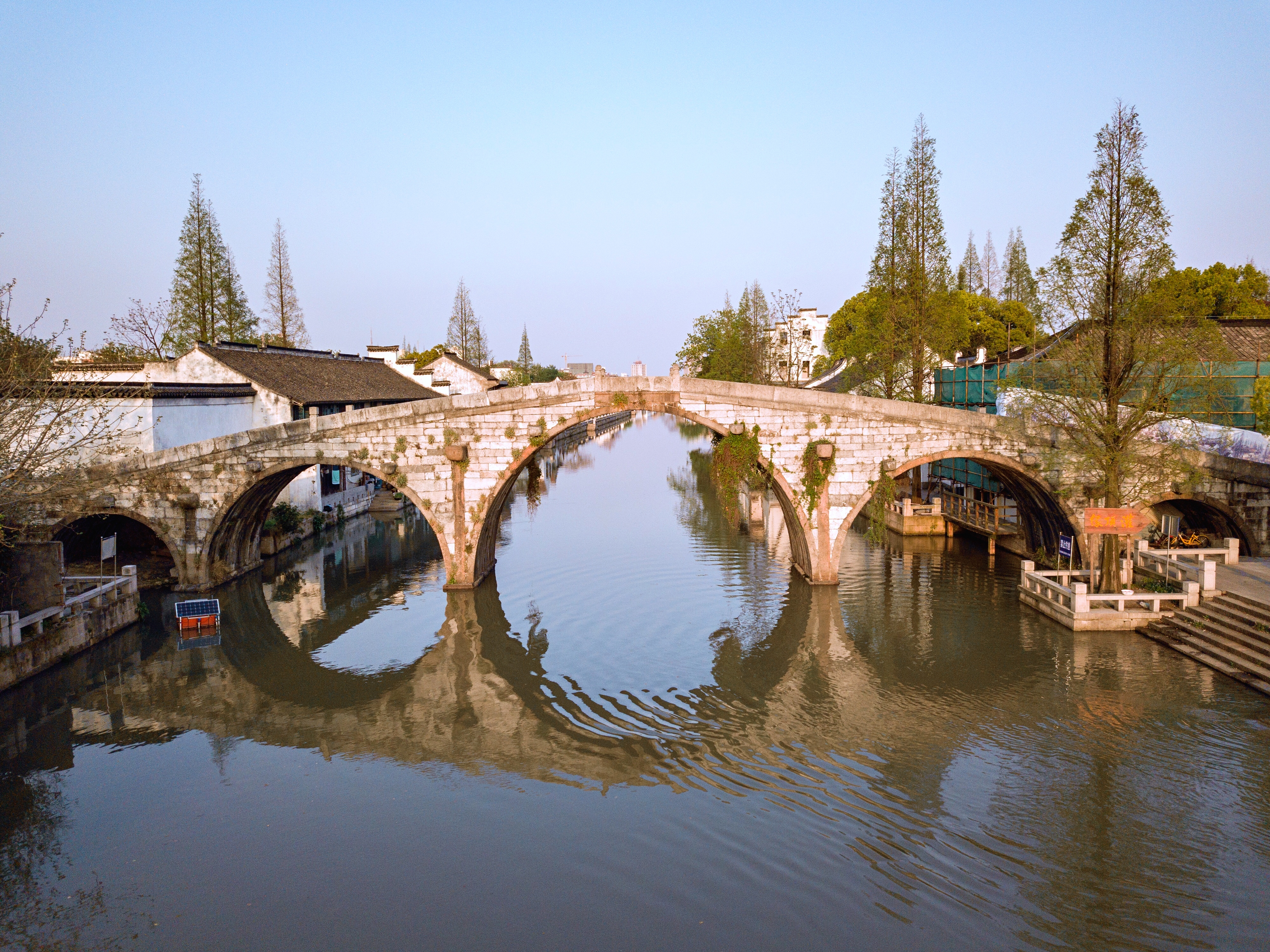
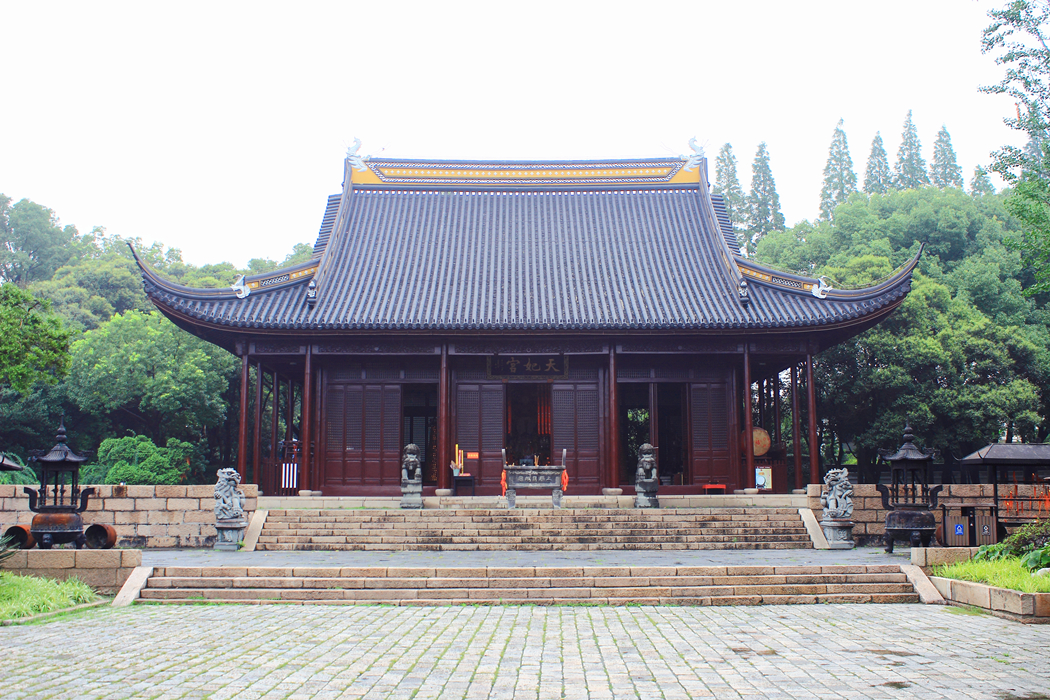
- Songjiang Guangfulin Relics Park Songjiang Square Pagoda Huzhu Pagoda Zuibaichi Songjiang Mosque Sheshan Basilica Xilin Chan Temple Dacang Bridge Tianfei Palace

- Songjiang in Shanghai
- Country: People's Republic of China
- Municipality: Shanghai

Area
  - Total: 605.64 km^{2} (233.84 sq mi)

Population (2020)
  - Total: 1,909,713
  - Density: 3,153.2/km^{2} (8,166.8/sq mi)
- Time zone: UTC+8 (China Standard)

Songjiang

Songjiang District
- Traditional Chinese: 松江區
- Simplified Chinese: 松江区
- Wugniu: son^{1} kaon^{1} chiu^{1}
- Literal meaning: Pine River District
Transcriptions
Standard Mandarin
- Hanyu Pinyin: Sōngjiāng qū
- Wade–Giles: Sung-chiang Ch'ü
Wu
- Wugniu: son^{1} kaon^{1} chiu^{1}
- IPA: Shanghainese: [soŋ˥ kɑ̃˧ tɕy˨]
Yue: Cantonese
- Jyutping: cung^{4} gong^{1} keoi^{1}

Songjiang County
- Traditional Chinese: 松江縣
- Simplified Chinese: 松江县
- Wugniu: son^{1} kaon^{1} yoe^{6}
- Literal meaning: Pine River County
Transcriptions
Standard Mandarin
- Hanyu Pinyin: Sōngjiāng xiàn
- Wade–Giles: Sung-chiang Hsien
Wu
- Wugniu: son^{1} kaon^{1} yoe^{6}
- IPA: Shanghainese: [soŋ˥ kɑ̃˧ ɦyø˨]
Yue: Cantonese
- Jyutping: cung^{4} gong^{1} jyun^{6}

Songjiang Prefecture
- Chinese: 松江府
- Wugniu: son^{1} kaon^{1} fu^{3}
- Postal: Sungkiang; Sungkiang Foo
- Literal meaning: Pine River Prefecture
Transcriptions
Standard Mandarin
- Hanyu Pinyin: Sōngjiāng fǔ
- Wade–Giles: Sung-chiang Fu
Wu
- Wugniu: son^{1} kaon^{1} fu^{3}
- IPA: Shanghainese: [soŋ˥ kɑ̃˧ fu˨]
Yue: Cantonese
- Jyutping: cung^{4} gong^{1} fu^{2}

Huating County
- Traditional Chinese: 華亭縣
- Simplified Chinese: 华亭县
- Wugniu: gho^{2} din^{2} yoe^{6}
- Literal meaning: Ornate Pavilian County
Transcriptions
Standard Mandarin
- Hanyu Pinyin: Huátíng xiàn
- Wade–Giles: Hua-t'ing Hsien
Wu
- Wugniu: gho^{2} din^{2} yoe^{6}
- IPA: Shanghainese: [ɦo˩ din˦ fu˩]
Yue: Cantonese
- Jyutping: waa^{4} ting^{4} jyun^{6}

Yunjian
- Traditional Chinese: 雲間
- Simplified Chinese: 云间
- Literal meaning: Between the Clouds
Transcriptions
Standard Mandarin
- Hanyu Pinyin: Yúnjiān
- Wade–Giles: Yün-chien
Yue: Cantonese
- Jyutping: wan^{4} gaan^{1}

Songjiang is a suburban district (formerly a county) of Shanghai. It has a land area of 605.64 km^{2} (233.84 sq mi) and a population of 1,909,713 (2020).

Songjiang Town, the urban center of the district, was formerly the major city in the area. It is now connected to downtown Shanghai by Line 9 of the Shanghai Metro.

== History ==
The Neolithic cultural sequence in the Songjiang area can be traced back to the Songze culture. Excavations at Guangfulin have yielded both Liangzhu-style jade objects and Longshan-style black pottery, indicating contact between the two traditions. During the Spring and Autumn period at the end of the Zhou and under the Warring States, the area of present-day Songjiang passed from Wu to Yue to Chu before the Qin's unification of China in the 3rd century BC.

By the mid-Tang, Huating County was created in 751 as the first county whose seat lay within the territory of present-day Shanghai.

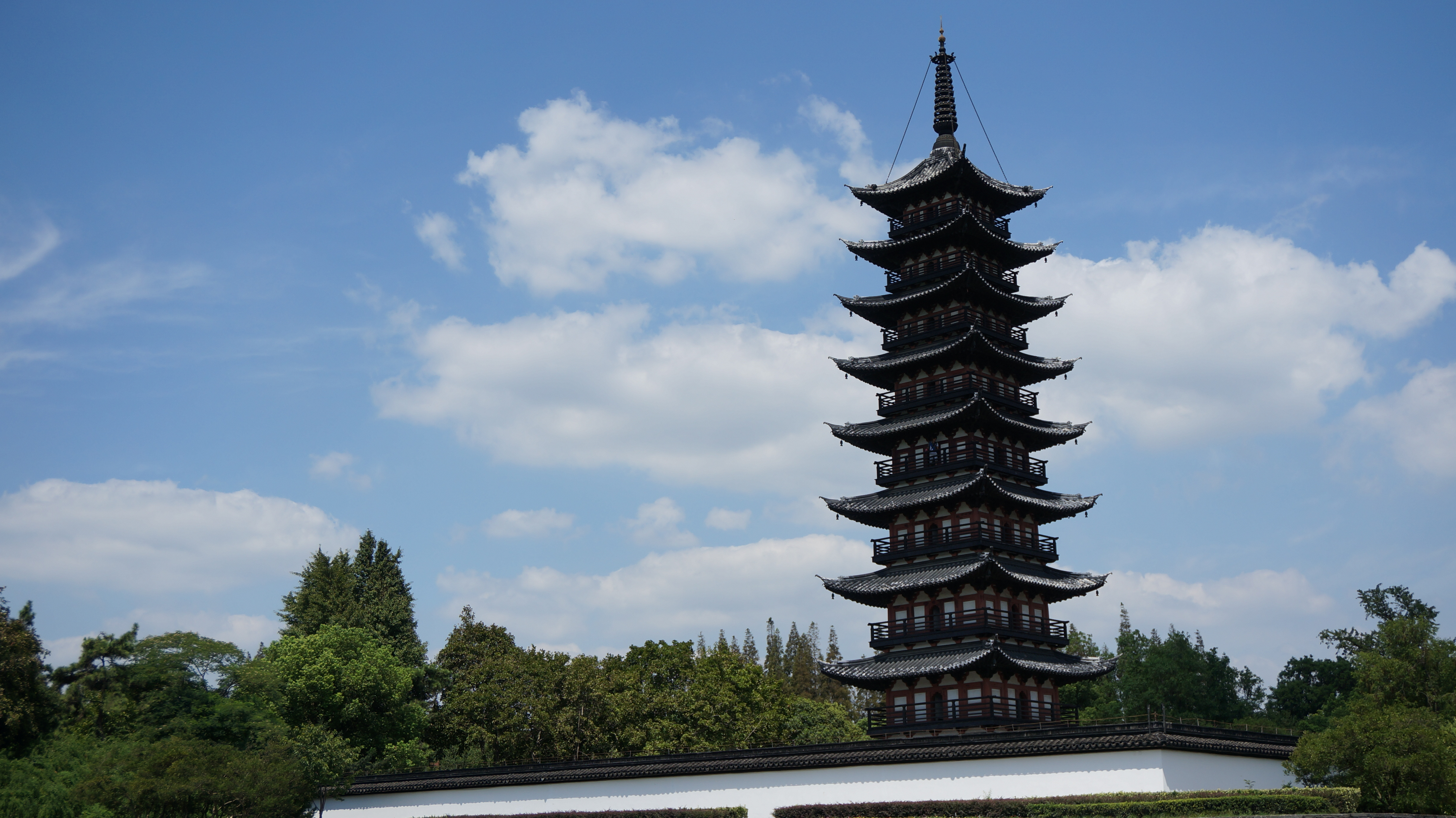
The Square Pagoda in Fangta Park, built between 1068 and 1077

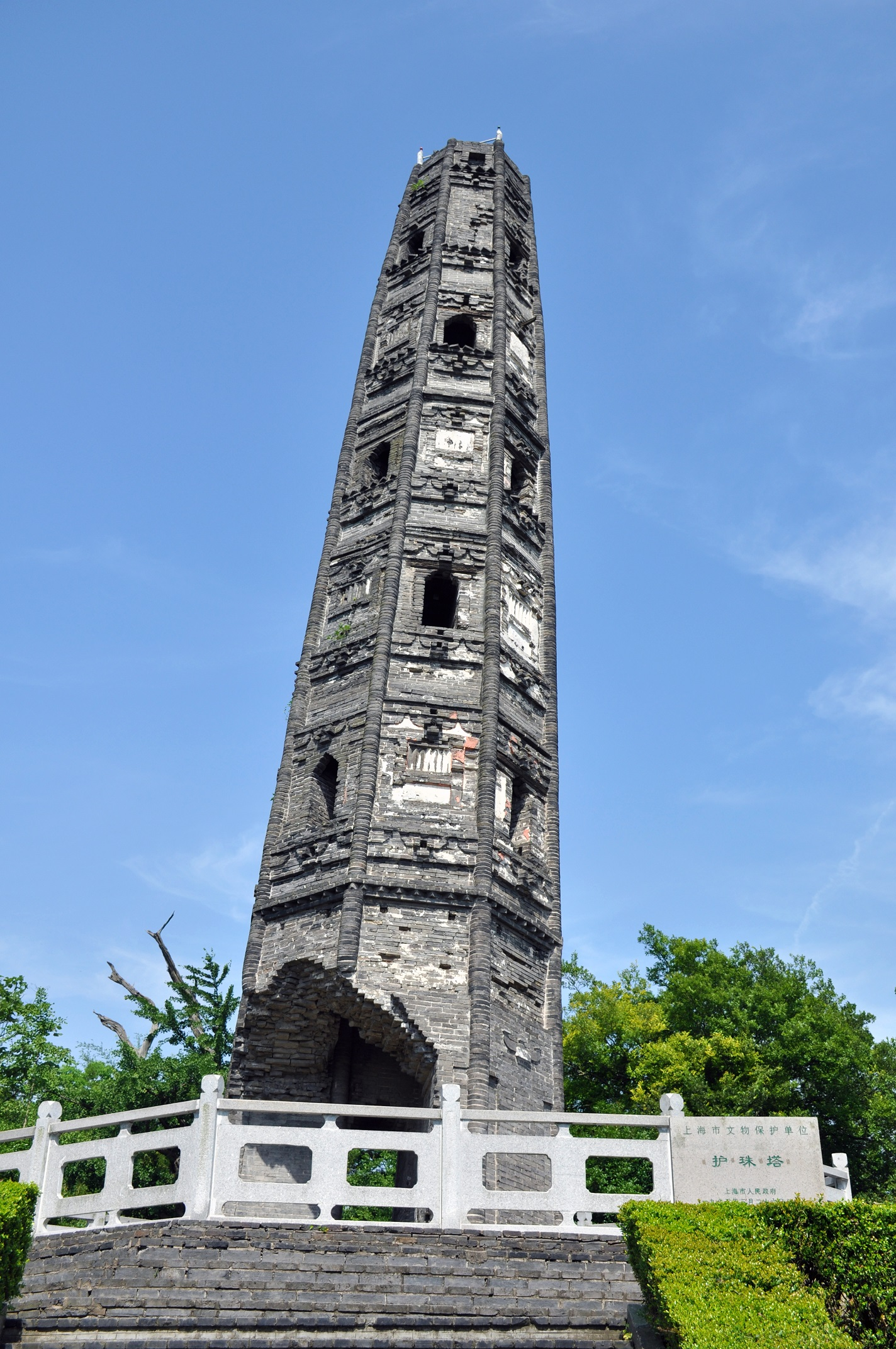
Huzhu Pagoda, a leaning tower on Tianma Hill built in 1079

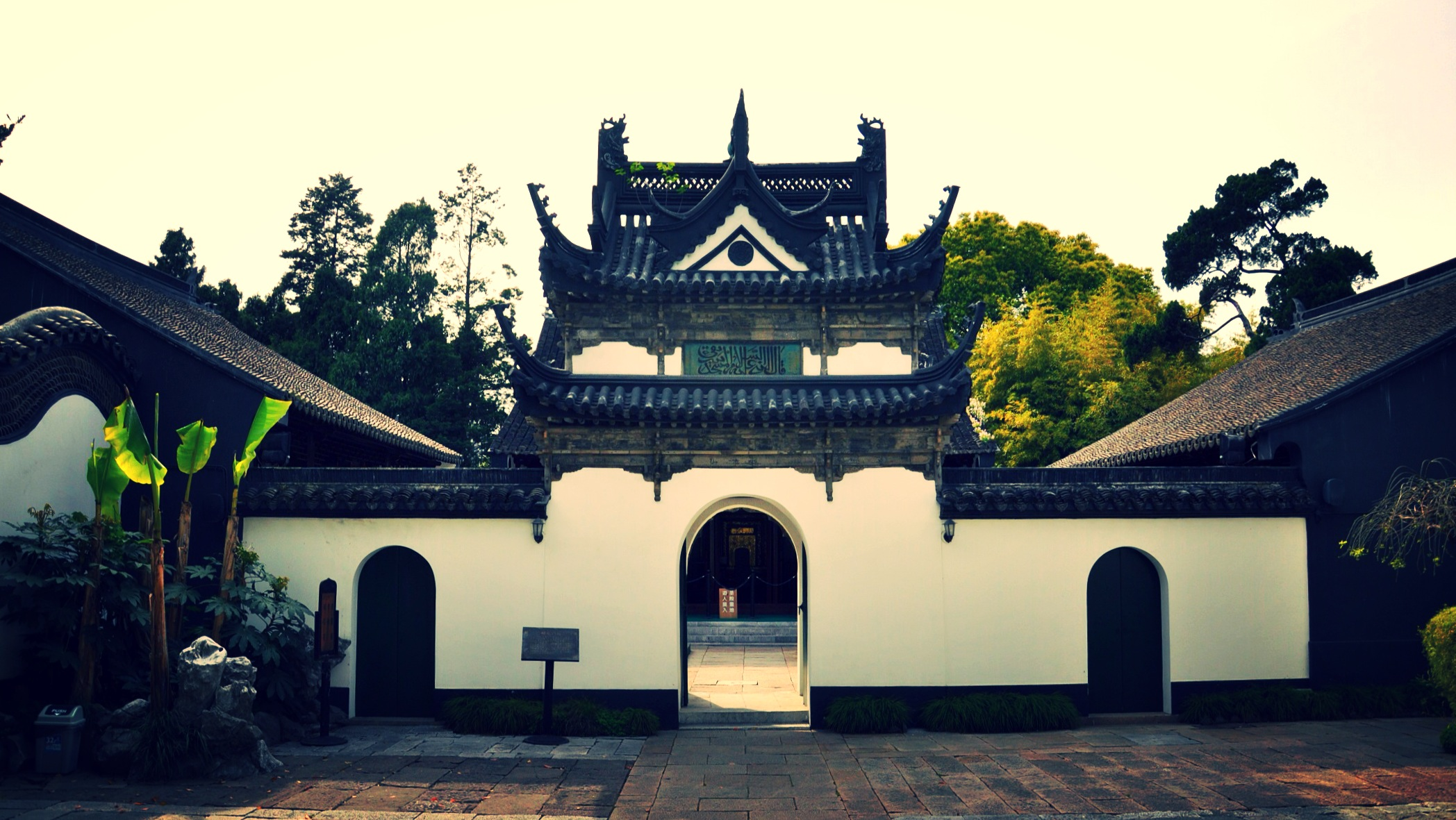
Songjiang Mosque after its 1391 rebuilding

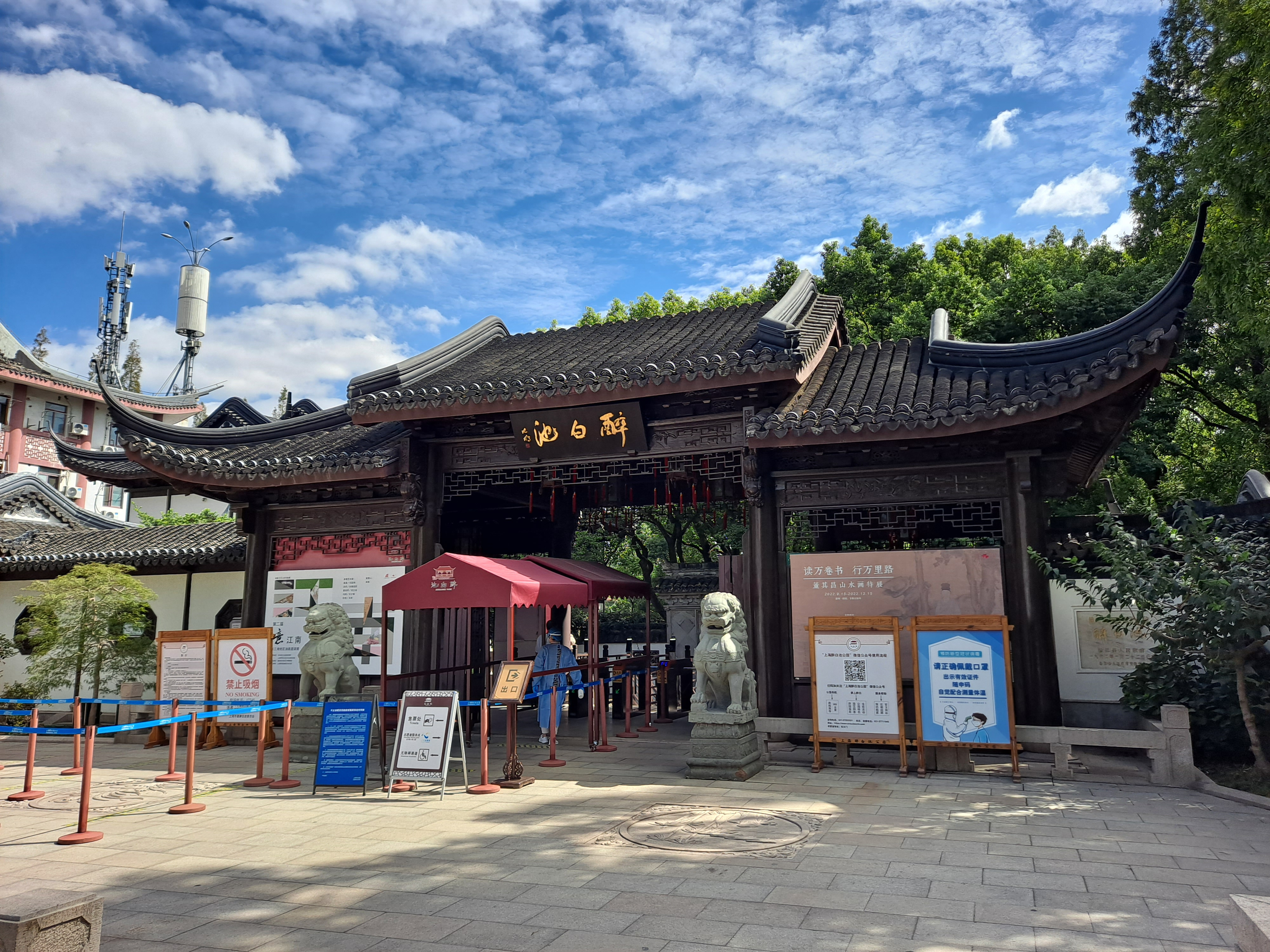
The entrance to Zuibaichi, a Song-era garden in Songjiang

In 1277, owing to its large population, Huating County was elevated to prefectural status and renamed Songjiang Prefecture in the next year. In the early 1290s five townships in the eastern part of the prefecture were separated to form Shanghai County, which remained under Songjiang's jurisdiction.

Around the turn of the 14th century, cotton cultivation and advanced textile techniques—traditionally attributed to Huang Daopo following her return from Hainan—spread from the Shanghai area throughout the Yangtze Delta, establishing cotton as the region's principal cash crop.

In 1367 the Ming regime imposed heavy brick levies on the Yangtze Delta for the construction of the Nanjing city walls, assigning Songjiang a quota of 90 million bricks. Local resistance led by the landlord Qian Hegao (錢鶴臯) briefly captured the prefectural seat before being suppressed.

The soil and hydrological conditions of the eastern coastal zone were poorly suited to rice. In the 15th century fiscal reforms further encouraged the cotton industry of the prefecture: cotton was formally included in tax assessments in 1433, and after 1486 the partial commutation of in-kind taxes into silver led peasant households to sell hand-woven cloth on the market.

Songjiang Prefecture ranked second only to Suzhou in the size of its tax quota during the Ming. The combined quota of its three counties was roughly equal to that of the entire province of Guangdong in the mid-Ming. The state also confiscated large estates and converted them into official land (guantian); by the mid-Ming more than 80 percent of the prefecture's arable land was classified as official land.

The Ming coastal-defence system in the prefecture consisted of five principal outposts—Chuansha, Nanhui, Qingcun, Zhelin and Jinshan (seat of the Jinshan Guard). Forty-seven recorded wokou raids occurred within the prefecture, the majority during the Jiajing reign (1522–1566). In response the authorities strengthened local defences.

In the late Ming, Songjiang was a centre of Chinese painting. Dong Qichang was its most prominent figure; other artists associated with the prefecture included Gu Zhengyi, Zhao Zuo and Shen Shichong. These painters are sometimes grouped into the Su-Song, Huating and Yunjian schools. In 1629 the scholars including Chen Zilong and Xia Yunyi founded the Ji Society (Jishe, 幾社), a regional branch of the Revival Society linked to the Yunjian Poetic School.

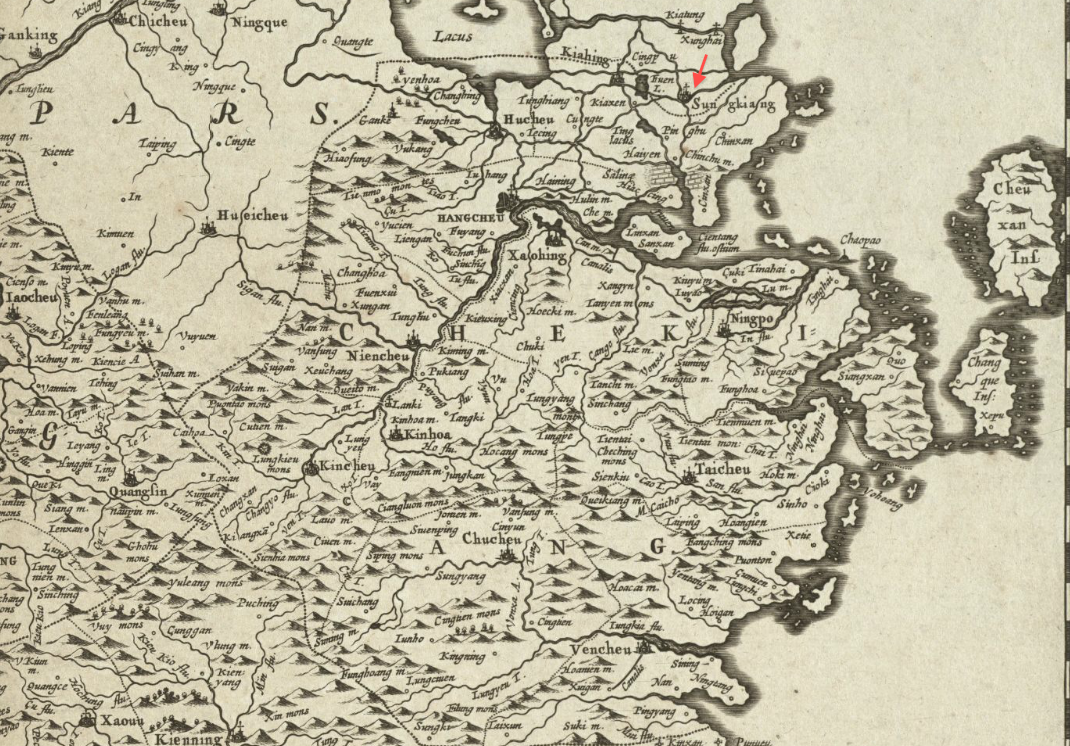
Detail of Jan Jansson’s 1664 map

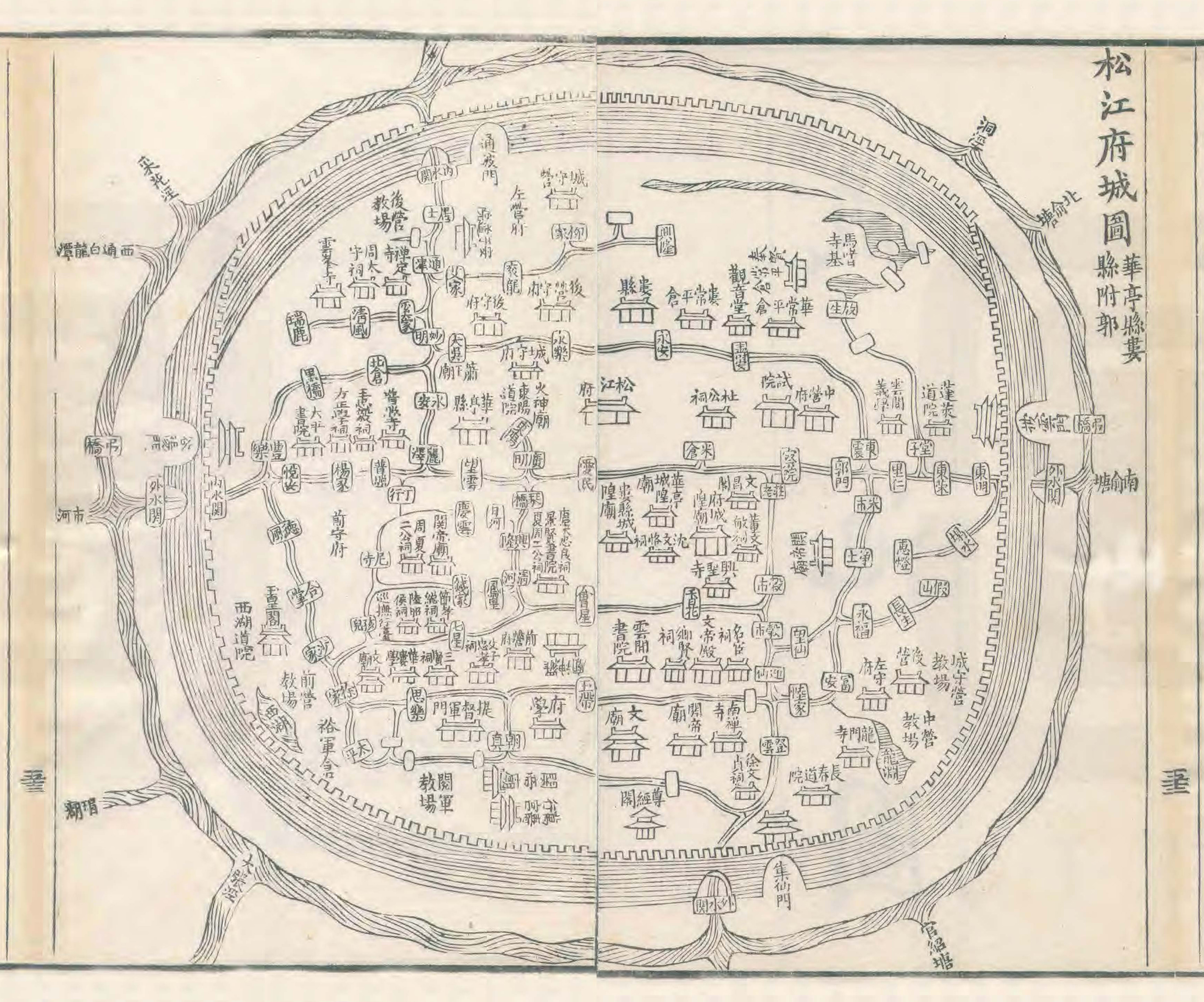
Map of Songjiang in 1818 showing its canal network

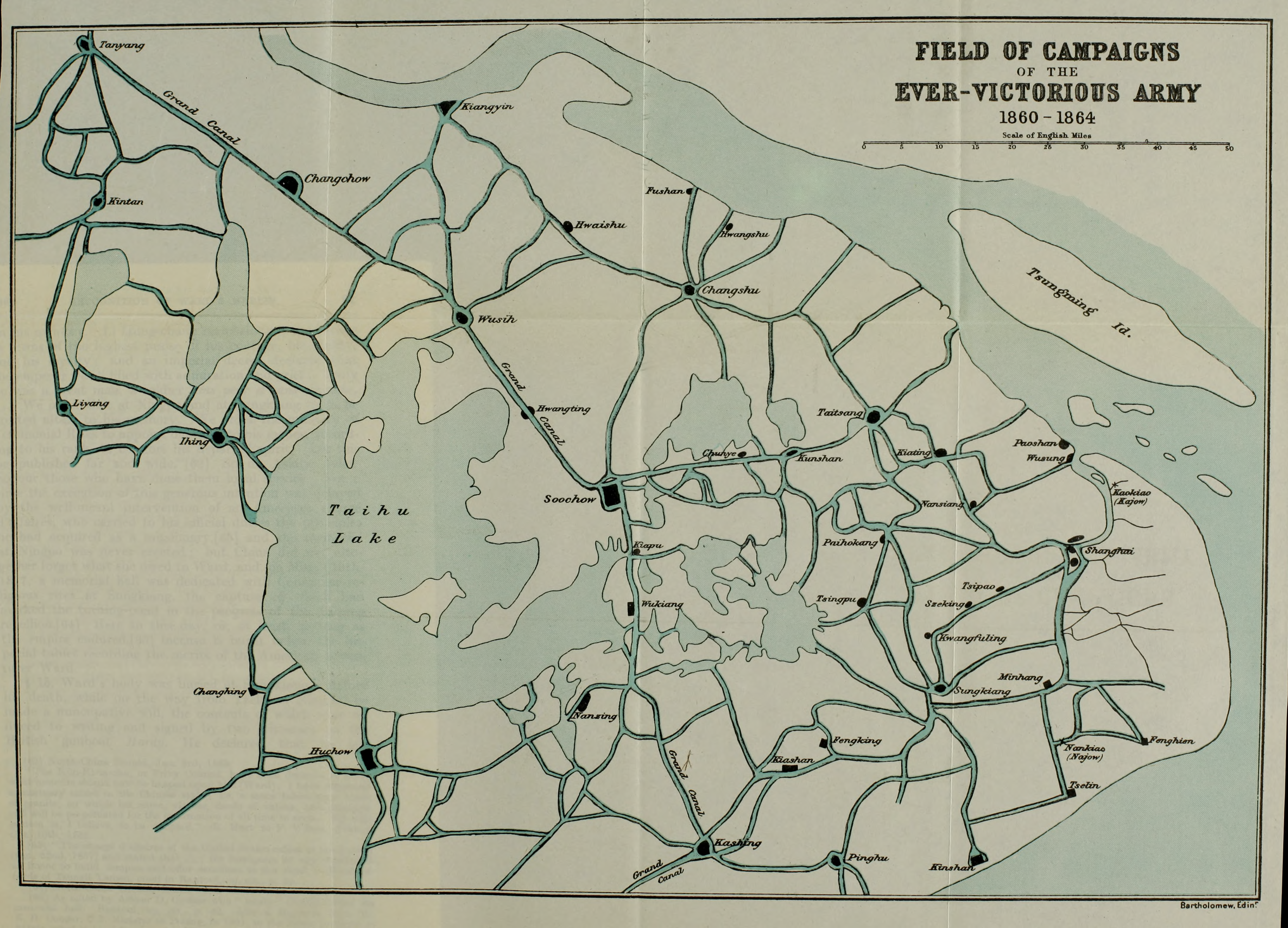
Canals around Songjiang in the mid-19th century

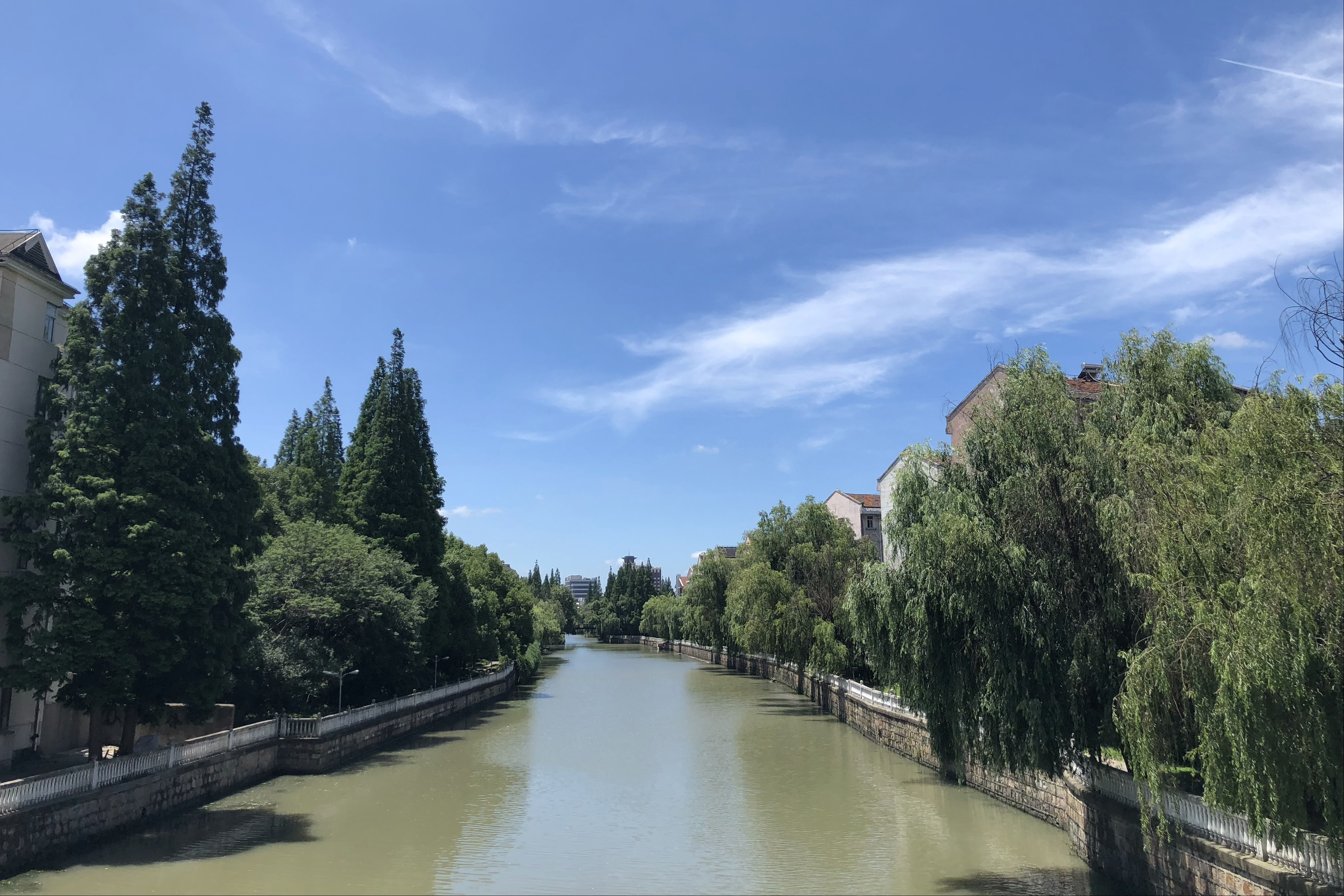
One of the canals today

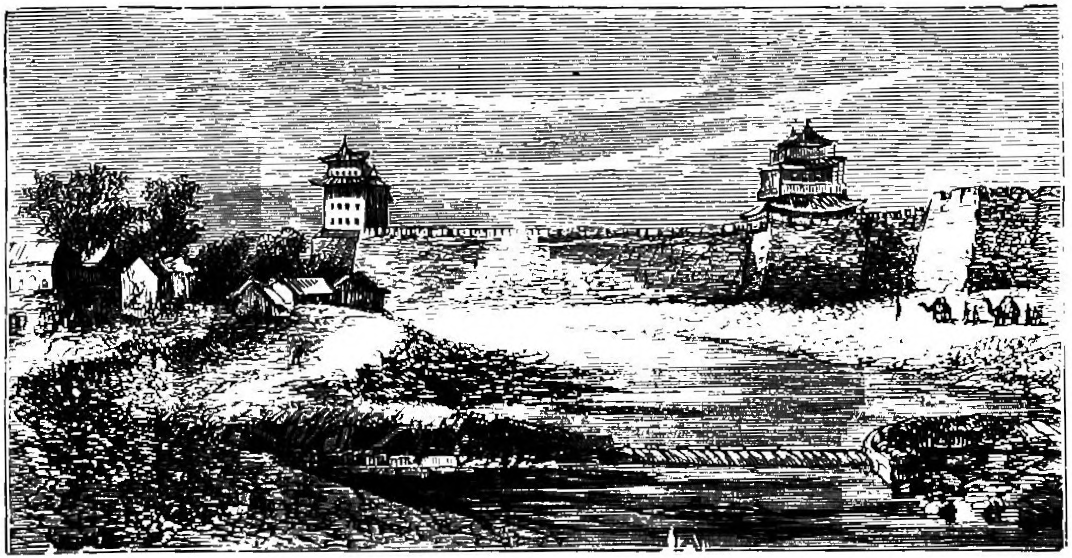
The city wall in the 1880s

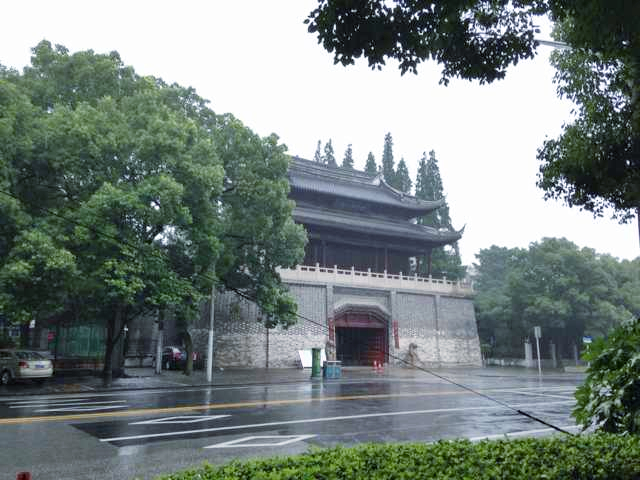
Restored gatehouse from the Ming-era city wall

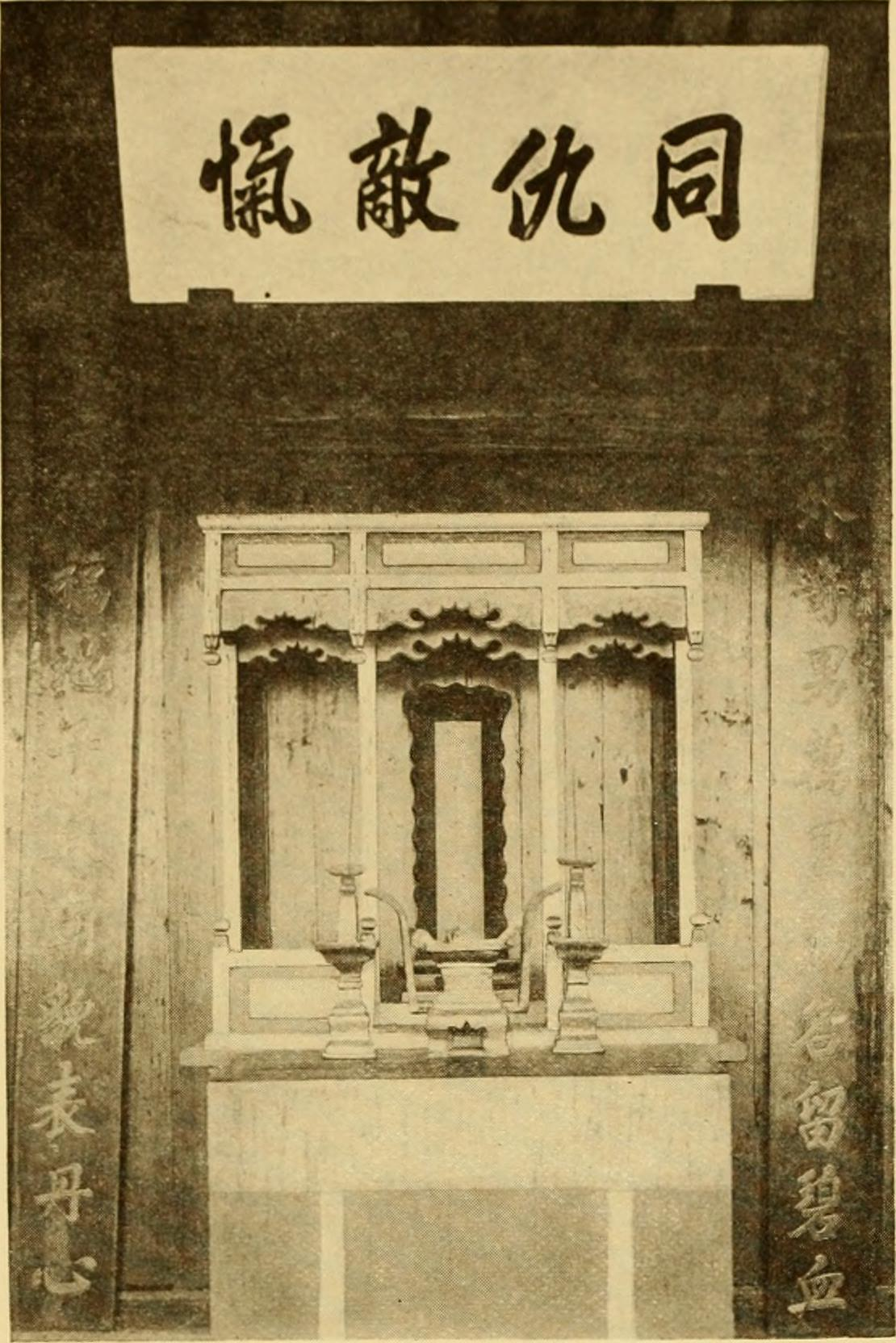
Shrine to Frederick Townsend Ward

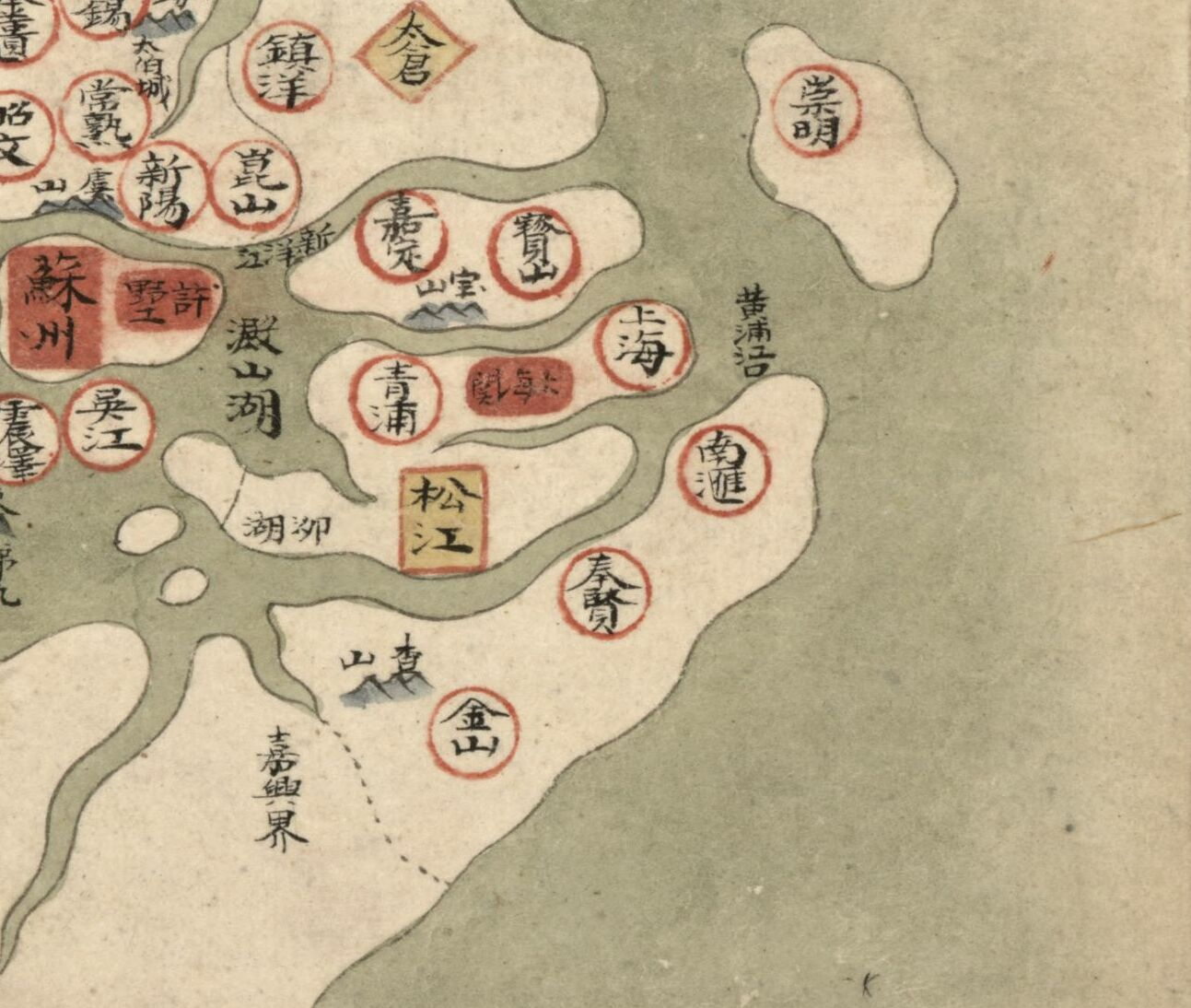
Counties of Songjiang Prefecture under the Qing

Following the collapse of the Southern Ming Hongguang regime in 1645, Qing forces under defected commander Li Chengdong (李成棟) occupied Songjiang Prefecture and suppressed gentry-led local resistance. In 1647, Chen conspired with Qing garrison commander Wu Shengzhao (吳勝兆) in a mutiny backed by coastal loyalist forces. The plot was exposed and the mutiny failed; Wu was executed, and Chen drowned himself while being escorted under arrest.

Songjiang was typically romanized as Sungkiang. It continued to serve as the prefectural capital under the "Right" Governor of Jiangnan based in Suzhou and then later under the governor of Jiangsu at Jiangning (now Nanjing). Unlike the foreign-held area of Shanghai, however, it fell to rebels during the Taiping Rebellion's Eastern Expedition. About a hundred Europeans under Frederick Townsend Ward failed to retake the town in June 1860. After gathering more Westerners, over 80 Philippine "Manilamen", and several pieces of artillery, a second assault in July 1860 retook the town with heavy losses. Out of about 250 men, 62 were killed and about 100 wounded, including Ward. Songjiang was then used by Ward, Henry Andres Burgevine, their Ever-Victorious Army, and Cheng Xueqi's division of the Huai Army as a base for raids and attacks on other Taiping positions under Li Xiucheng throughout the "Battle of Shanghai".

Following the 1912 abolition of prefectures, Lou County was merged into Huating, which was renamed Songjiang in 1914 to avoid duplication with its namesake in Gansu. In the early 1930s, the Jiangsu provincial government established the Songjiang Administrative Inspection District (initially the Fourth District), with Songjiang as its seat, administering the surrounding counties of Qingpu, Jinshan, and Fengxian. Following subsequent administrative reorganizations, it was redesignated as the Third District, expanding its jurisdiction to include Nanhui, Chuansha, and Shanghai counties while retaining its seat at Songjiang, before Baoshan, Jiading, and Chongming counties (which then included the Shengsi Islands) were further incorporated in 1945.

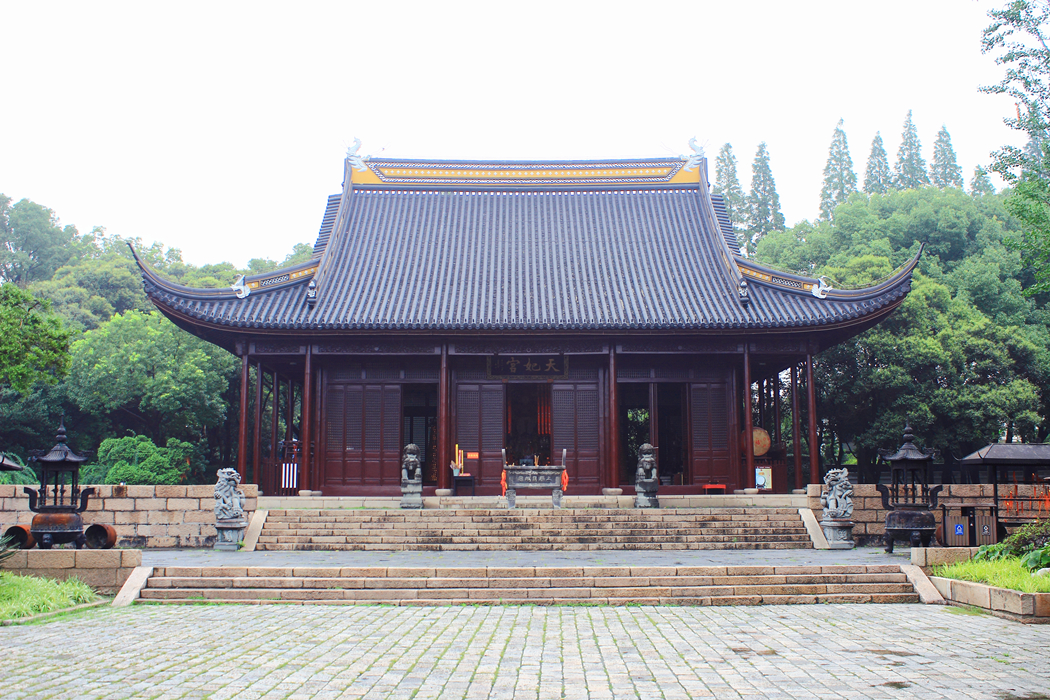
Tianfei Palace, an 1883 Chinese temple to the sea goddess Mazu, in Fangta Park, Songjiang

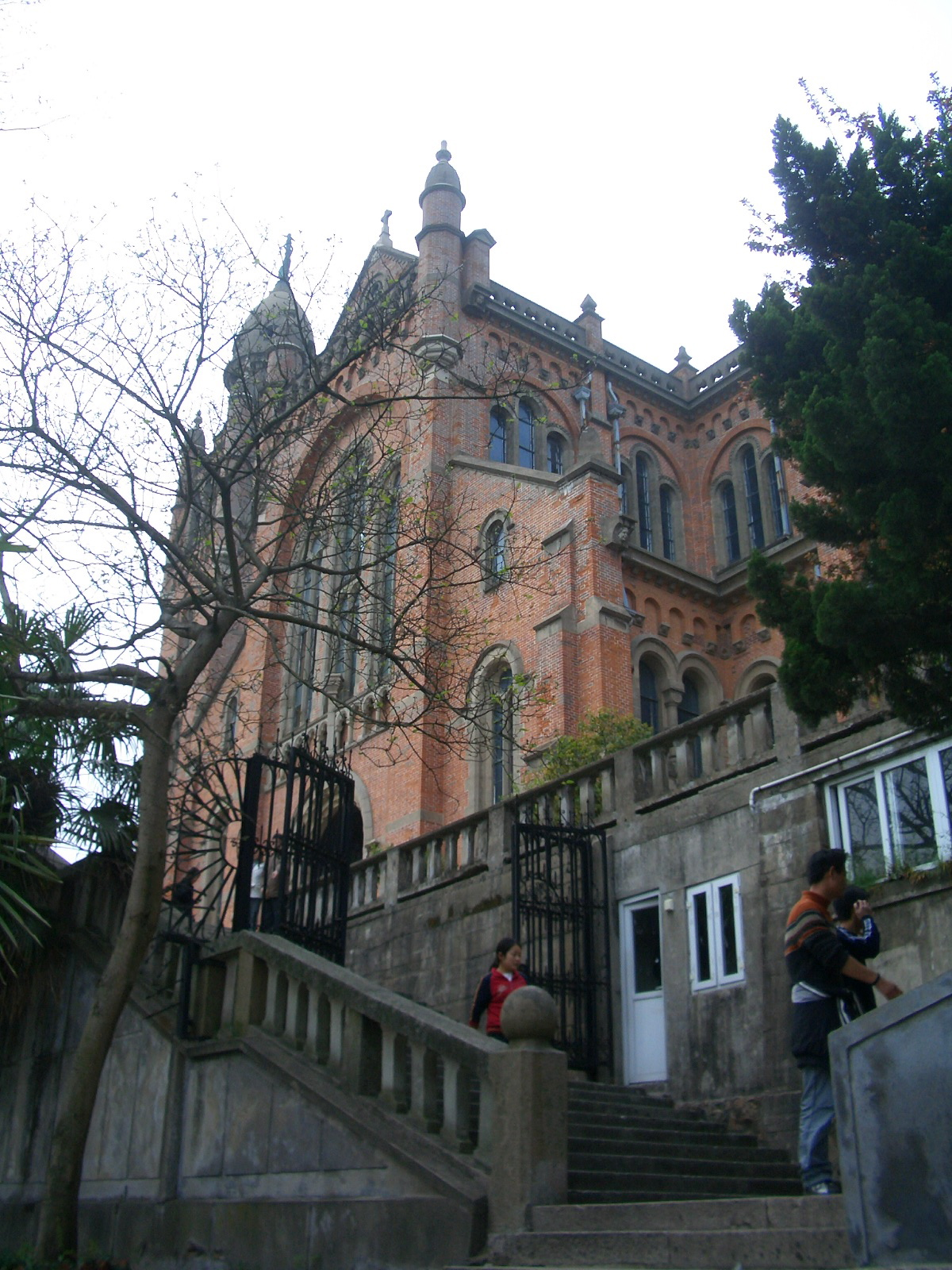
Sheshan Basilica, constructed from 1924 to 1935 on She Hill

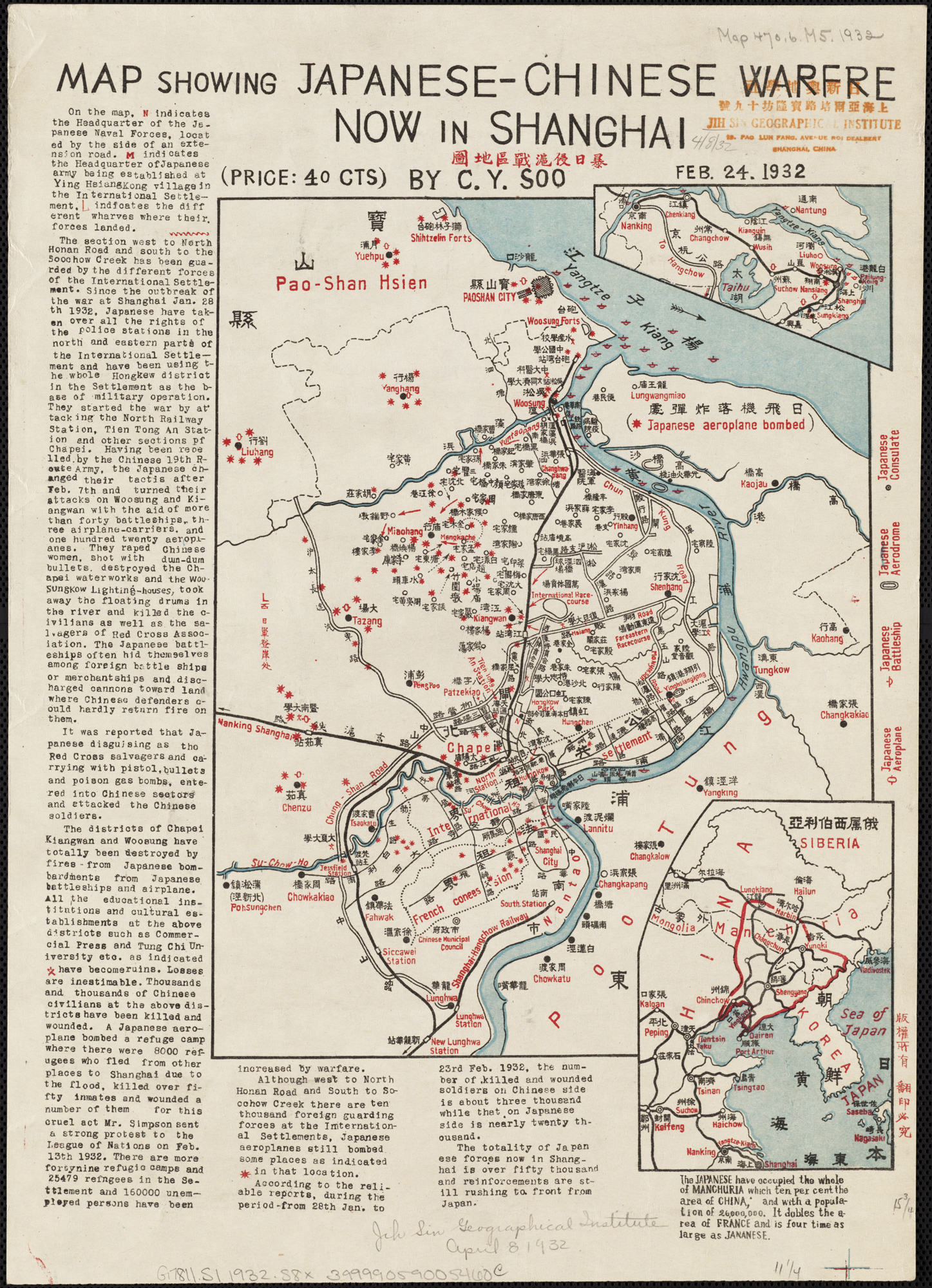
A 1932 map showing Sungkiang on Shanghai's southern railway

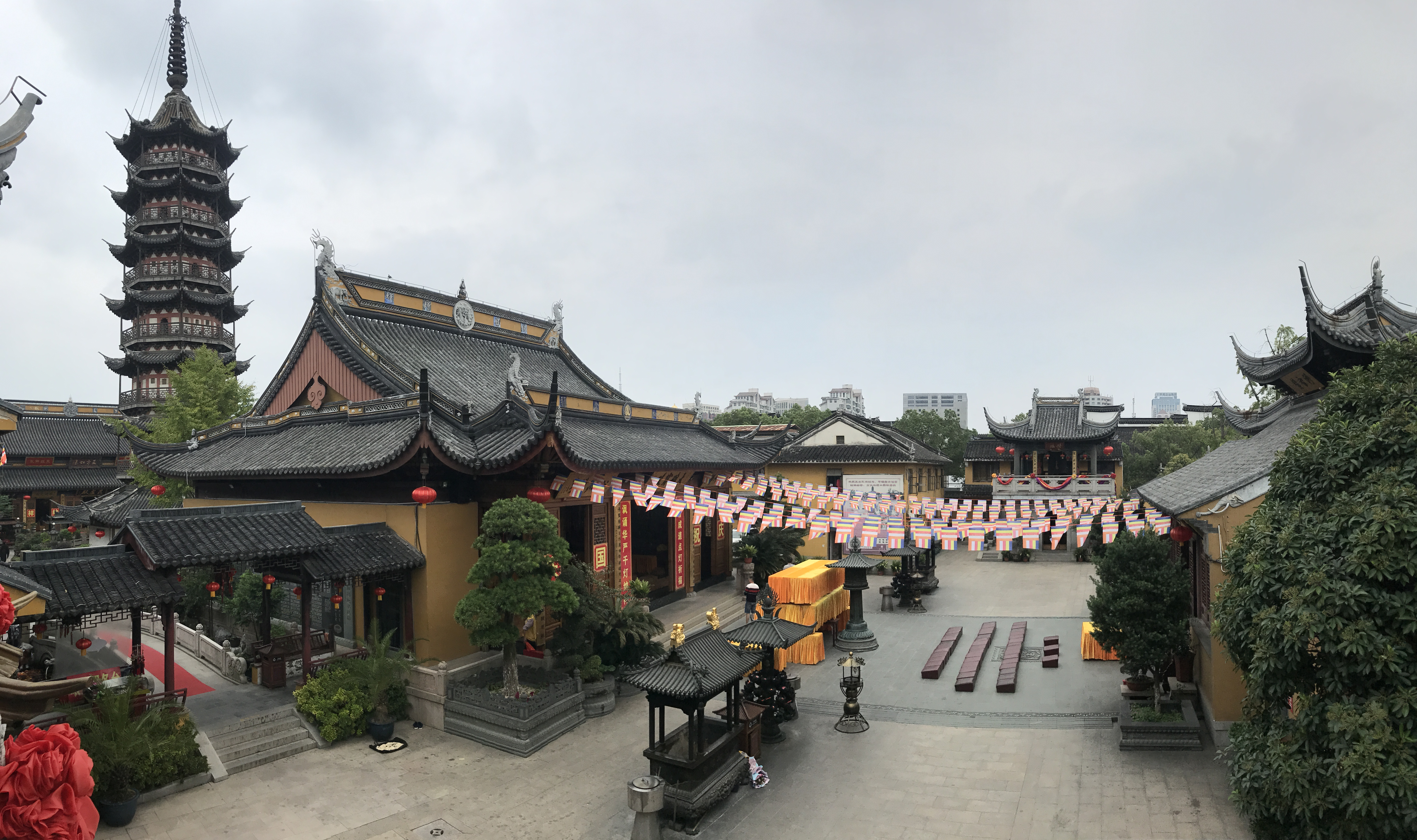
Xilin Temple after its 1980s reconstruction

During World War II, Japan occupied Songjiang from 9 November 1937 until 1945. Afterwards, both the Nationalist and Communist regional government was moved to Shanghai proper, leaving Songjiang a comparatively rural county. The city's many ancient religious structures and examples of traditional architecture were seriously damaged during the 1960s and 1970s amid the Cultural Revolution. Following the PRC's Opening Up Policy, Songjiang restored its more important religious buildings and developed into a college town hosting several large universities. In 1998, it was elevated to its current status as an urban district.

== Significant features ==
Some of the notable features in Songjiang District include:

- Songjiang New City is a major new-town development located within Songjiang District. It was developed as part of Shanghai's One City, Nine Towns plan. The New City will encompass an area of 60 square kilometers (23 sq mi) when completed, and will have a total population of 500,000 residents. The New City reflects Garden City design principles, with a large proportion of land allocated to green-space and parks.
- Thames Town is a residential and commercial development located within the Songjiang New City that both imitates and is influenced by classic English market town styles. Some of the architecture has been directly copied from buildings found in England.
- Songjiang University Town is a major higher education sector located in the district. It is the largest higher education sector in mainland China.
- Shanghai First People's Hospital has a campus located within the Songjiang New City.
- Shanghai Film Studios are located in Songjiang District.
- InterContinental Hotel Shanghai Wonderland is built against the walls of a former quarry, and partly underwater: it claims to be the world's first underground five-star resort.

Cultural sights in Songjiang include:

- Sheshan Hill with Sheshan Basilica
- Fangta Park, one of the first celebrations of traditional Chinese architecture following the Cultural Revolution, including the city's Square Pagoda and Mazu Temple
- Huzhu Pagoda on Tianmashan

== Government and infrastructure ==
The People's Government of Songjiang, Shanghai is located on No. 1 Yuanzhong Road.

The Shanghai Women's Prison is in Songjiang District.

== Transport ==
Songjiang District is located approximately 25 kilometers (16 mi) from Hongqiao International Airport and 70 kilometers (43 mi) from Pudong International Airport. Songjiang is currently served by one metro line operated by Shanghai Metro, one suburban line operated by China Railway, and two tram lines.

=== Metro ===
- Line 9 - Songjiang South Railway Station, Zuibaichi Park, Songjiang Sports Center, Songjiang Xincheng, Songjiang University Town, Dongjing, Sheshan, Sijing, Jiuting
- Line 12 extension (under construction)
- Line 23 extension (planned)

=== Suburban rail ===
- Jinshan Railway - Chunshen, Xinqiao, Chedun, Yexie

=== Railway stations ===
- Shanghai Songjiang railway station
- Songjiang North railway station (closed)

=== Songjiang tram ===
- Line T1
- Line T2

=== Buses ===
- Songjiang Bus

=== Highways ===
- Shanghai-Kunming highway

== Subdistricts and towns ==
Songjiang District has six subdistricts, eleven towns and three special township-level divisions.

Name	Chinese (S)	Hanyu Pinyin	Shanghainese Romanization	Population (2010)	Area (km^{2})
Yueyang Subdistrict	岳阳街道	Yuèyáng Jiēdào	ngoq yan ka do	112,671	5.65
Yongfeng Subdistrict	永丰街道	Yǒngfēng Jiēdào	ion fon ka do	93,330	24.53
Zhongshan Subdistrict	中山街道	Zhōngshān Jiēdào	tzon se ka do	98,888	26.34
Fangsong Subdistrict	方松街道	Fāngsōng Jiēdào	faon son ka do	414,548	14.76
Guangfulin Subdistrict	广富林街道	Guǎngfùlín Jiēdào	kuaon fu lin ka do	414,548	19.05
Jiuliting Subdistrict	九里亭街道	Jiǔlǐtíng Jiēdào	cioe lij din ka do	414,548	6.79
Chedun town	车墩镇	Chēdūn Zhèn	tsau ten tzen	167,687	45.30
Dongjing town	洞泾镇	Dòngjīng Zhèn	don cin tzen	57,861	24.51
Jiuting town	九亭镇	Jiǔtíng Zhèn	cioe din tzen	147,398	26.13
Maogang town	泖港镇	Mǎogǎng Zhèn	mo kaon tzen	41,626	57.62
Sheshan town	佘山镇	Shéshān Zhèn	sau se tzen	32,295	55.70
Shihudang town	石湖荡镇	Shíhúdàng Zhèn	zaq wu daon tzen	44,011	44.28
Sijing town	泗泾镇	Sìjīng Zhèn	sy cin tzen	94,279	23.98
Xiaokunshan town	小昆山镇	Xiǎokūnshān Zhèn	sio khuen se tzen	51,606	30.52
Xinbang town	新浜镇	Xīnbāng Zhèn	sin pan tzen	33,627	44.75
Xinqiao town	新桥镇	Xīnqiáo Zhèn	sin djio tzen	155,856	31.43
Yexie town	叶榭镇	Yèxiè Zhèn	yiq zia tzen	80,104	72.49
Sheshan Resort	佘山度假区	Shéshān Dùjiàqū	sau se du ka chiu	42,583	64.08
Shanghai Songjiang Export Processing Zone	上海松江出口加工区	Shànghǎi Sōngjiāng Chūkǒu Jiāgōngqū	zaon he son kaon tseq khoe ka kon chiu	60,797	2.98
Songjiang Industrial Zone	松江工业区	Sōngjiāng Gōngyèqū	son kaon kon gniq chiu	60,797	43.69

== Climate ==
Climate data for Songjiang District, elevation 8 m (26 ft), (1991–2020 normals, extremes 1951–present)
Month	Jan	Feb	Mar	Apr	May	Jun	Jul	Aug	Sep	Oct	Nov	Dec	Year
Record high °C (°F)	23.3 (73.9)	27.0 (80.6)	31.8 (89.2)	33.1 (91.6)	37.9 (100.2)	37.6 (99.7)	40.3 (104.5)	41.2 (106.2)	37.0 (98.6)	36.0 (96.8)	29.7 (85.5)	24.0 (75.2)	41.2 (106.2)
Mean daily maximum °C (°F)	8.5 (47.3)	10.7 (51.3)	15.5 (59.9)	21.3 (70.3)	26.0 (78.8)	28.6 (83.5)	33.5 (92.3)	33.0 (91.4)	28.8 (83.8)	23.8 (74.8)	18.1 (64.6)	11.3 (52.3)	21.6 (70.9)
Daily mean °C (°F)	4.9 (40.8)	6.7 (44.1)	10.8 (51.4)	16.2 (61.2)	21.4 (70.5)	24.7 (76.5)	29.3 (84.7)	29.1 (84.4)	24.9 (76.8)	19.7 (67.5)	14.0 (57.2)	7.2 (45.0)	17.4 (63.3)
Mean daily minimum °C (°F)	2.0 (35.6)	3.5 (38.3)	7.2 (45.0)	12.3 (54.1)	17.7 (63.9)	21.9 (71.4)	26.2 (79.2)	26.3 (79.3)	22.0 (71.6)	16.2 (61.2)	10.6 (51.1)	3.9 (39.0)	14.2 (57.5)
Record low °C (°F)	−10.5 (13.1)	−9.0 (15.8)	−5.2 (22.6)	−1.5 (29.3)	5.8 (42.4)	12.0 (53.6)	17.0 (62.6)	17.8 (64.0)	10.2 (50.4)	1.0 (33.8)	−3.6 (25.5)	−8.7 (16.3)	−10.5 (13.1)
Average precipitation mm (inches)	70.4 (2.77)	66.2 (2.61)	96.5 (3.80)	85.1 (3.35)	94.9 (3.74)	206.4 (8.13)	135.7 (5.34)	171.9 (6.77)	107.8 (4.24)	66.0 (2.60)	58.2 (2.29)	50.8 (2.00)	1,209.9 (47.64)
Average precipitation days (≥ 0.1 mm)	11.1	10.5	13.2	11.9	11.8	14.5	11.4	12.3	10.2	7.4	9.1	8.5	131.9
Average snowy days	2.1	1.7	0.6	0	0	0	0	0	0	0	0.2	0.7	5.3
Average relative humidity (%)	76	75	74	73	75	81	79	79	78	75	76	73	76
Mean monthly sunshine hours	109.3	112.8	138.6	162.5	168.6	123.0	204.8	200.7	159.7	154.7	127.2	123.6	1,785.5
Percentage possible sunshine	34	36	37	42	40	29	48	49	43	44	40	39	40
Source: China Meteorological Administration all-time September Record High All-time October high

== Attractions ==
Xilin Chan Temple is a Buddhist temple in Yueyang Subdistrict, which is also a famous tourist attraction.

Zuibaichi is one of the five ancient Chinese gardens in Shanghai that dates back to the Song dynasty.

The Songjiang Mosque is the oldest mosque in Shanghai with its latest rebuild in 1391.

Songjiang's emblematic tower is the 9-story Fangta Pagoda, or Songjiang Square Pagoda.

Dacang Bridge is a historic stone arch bridge over the Old City River in the district.

Songjiang Tangjing Building is located in the Zhongshan Primary School, Songjiang District and it is the oldest surviving above-ground relic in Shanghai built in 859 AD.

Sheshan Basilica is a Roman Catholic church built on Sheshan Hill in the Romanesque architectural style. Originally constructed in 1863, the current church was finished in 1935.

== Notable people ==
- Han Bangqing, author of The Sing-song Girls of Shanghai (Lou County)
- Hou Shaoqiu, Jiang Huilin, Xia Yunyi, Chen Zilong, Xia Wanchun, heroes
- Gu Yong, Lu Xun (Eastern Wu general), Xu Jie, statesmen
- Lu Ji, Lu Yun, Chen Jiru, Tao Zongyi, Qian Fu, Gu Qing, writers
- Shen Du, Dong Qichang, Zhang Nanheng, Zhang Zhao, Shi Zhecun, Cheng Shifa, calligraphers
- Zhu Kerou, Huang Daopo, Ding Niangzi, craftspeople
- Zhu Shunshui, Chen Yongkang, experts
- He Dong, Ping Hailan, Ma Xiangru, educator
