= Songjiang Mosque =

Mosque in Songjiang, Shanghai, China

- 松江清真寺
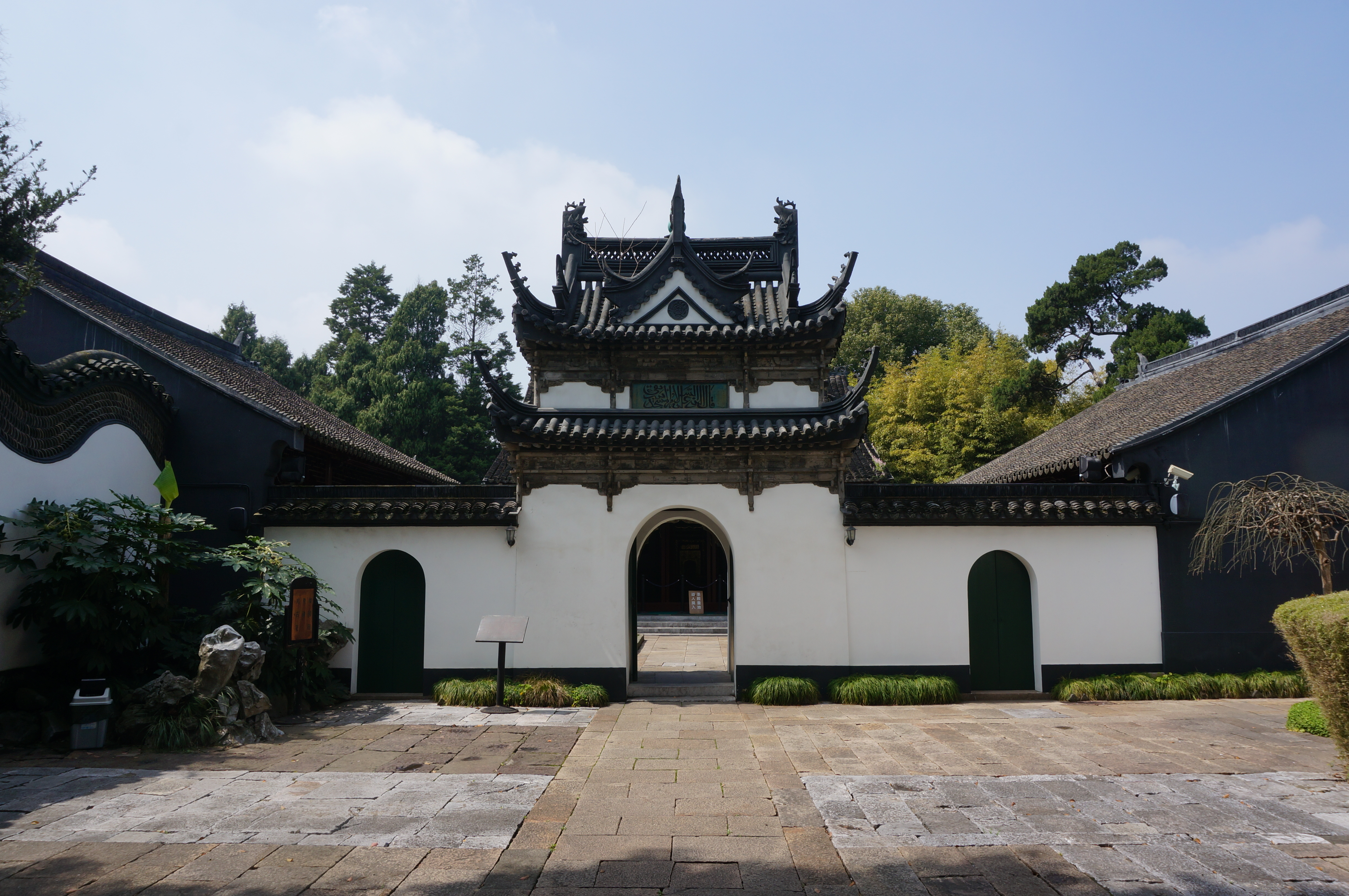

- Location of the mosque in Shanghai

Religion
- Affiliation: Islam
- Branch/tradition: Sunni
- Ecclesiastical or organizational status: mosque
- Status: Active

Location
- Location: 75 Gangbeng Alley, Songjiang, Shanghai
- Country: China
- Interactive map of Songjiang Mosque
- Coordinates: 31°00′29″N 121°13′21″E

Architecture
- Type: mosque
- Style: Chinese
- Established: c. 1368
- Completed: 1391
- Interior area: 4,900 m^{2} (53,000 sq ft)

The Songjiang Mosque (Chinese: 松江清真寺; pinyin: Sōngjiāng Qīngzhēnsì), formerly called the Real Religion Mosque, is a mosque in Songjiang District, Shanghai, China; and is the oldest mosque in Shanghai.

== History ==
The mosque was constructed during the Toghon Temür (r. 1333–1368) reign of the Yuan dynasty. It was rebuilt in 1391 and expanded three times during the Ming dynasty. The mosque then went through four renovations during the Qing dynasty. On 26 August 1908, the Shanghai municipal government listed the mosque as an item of cultural heritage. The mosque underwent renovation again in 1985.

== Architecture ==
The mosque covers an area of 4,900 square metres (53,000 sq ft). It was constructed in traditional Hui Muslim Chinese palace architecture with Arabic calligraphy. The mosque consists of the mail hall, prayer niche, corridor, two sermon halls and a bathroom. In the east of the mosque lies the Bunker Gate Tower for Muslims to do prayer. The prayer hall is located in the opposite of the tower in the west of the mosque. It is divided into the front and the back hall, with characteristics of Ming and Yuan architecture respectively.

== Transportation ==
The mosque is accessible within walking distance north of Zuibaichi Park station of Shanghai Metro.

== See also ==
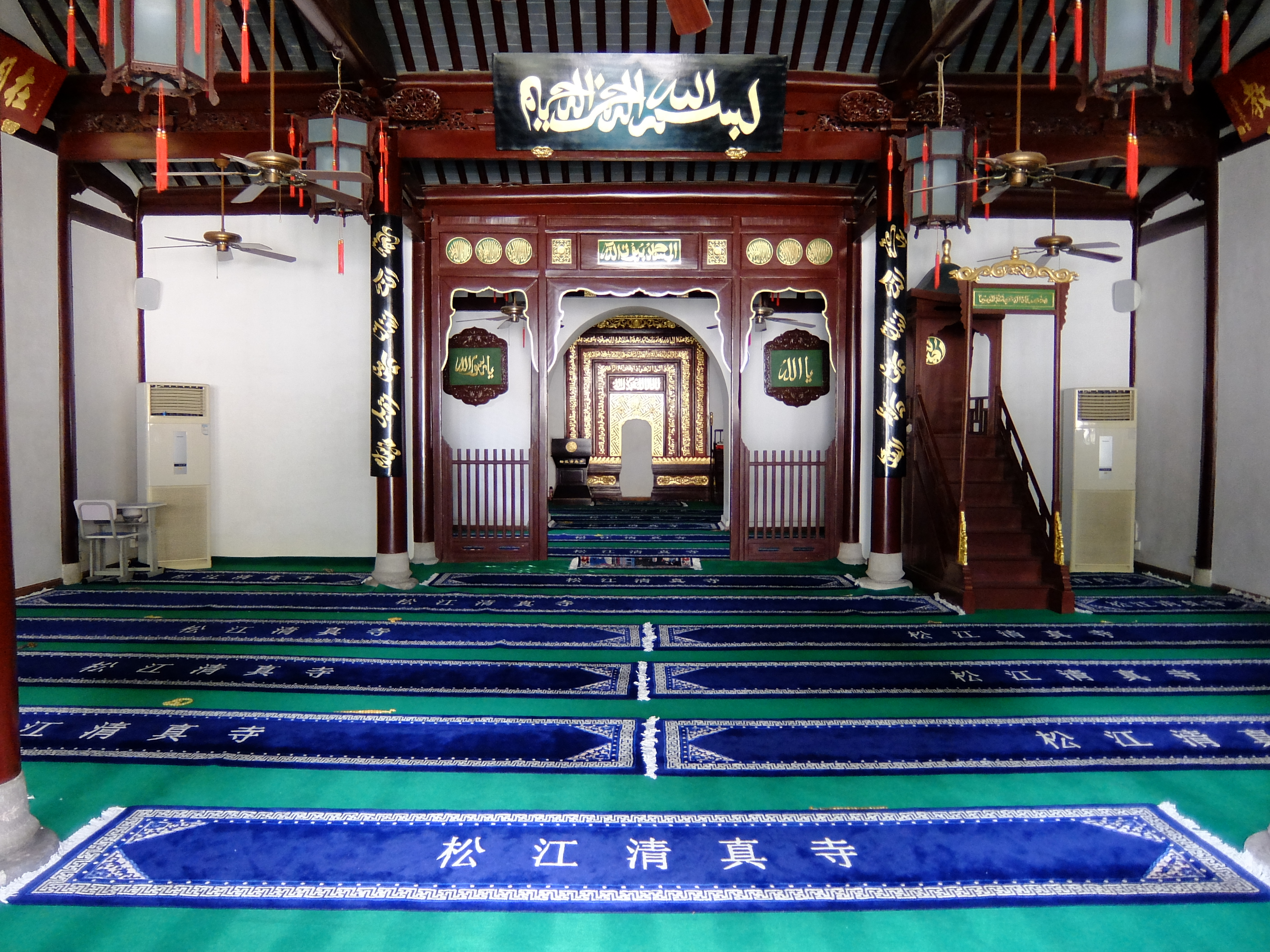
The mosque prayer hall

- Islam in China
- List of mosques in China
