= Guangfulin =

Archaeological site in Shanghai, China

Coordinates: 31°3′49.86″N 121°11′37.82″E

Guangfulin is an archaeological site in Songjiang District, Shanghai, China. It is estimated to be over 5,000 years old. Artifacts from the Zhou dynasty have also been unearthed at the site. The site covers 250 square kilometers (c.97 square miles). It was announced to be the Shanghai Cultural Relics Protection Site in December 1977, and was approved by the state council as one of the seventh batch of National Key Cultural Relics Protection Units in May 2013. The Guangfulin Relics Park is under construction.

== Discovery ==
In 1958, local residents discovered Guangfulin Relics which were followed by a four archaeological excavation afterwards.

In 1961, archaeologists confirmed that Guangfulin Relics belonged to Liangzhu Cultural Relics, which formed between the period of Maqiao Relics and that of Songze Relics.

From 1999 to 2001, archaeologists began their second and third excavation. Large architecture artifacts in Han dynasty were unearthed . Later, different kinds of new artifacts in Liangzhu characteristics were also known to the public, due to which Guangfulin Relics gained its name.

In 2008, eight Guangfulin cultural graves were found. Many bronze sacrificial vessels of Spring and Autumn period were uncovered. Rice, deer horns and pig bones found depicted the original life of the residents living a long time ago.

== Significance ==
At the beginning of the 21st century, discoveries in Songjiang Guangfulin Cultural Relics made great contribution to archaeology. Firstly, it clearly divided the primitive society into types like Songze Cultural, Liangzhu Cultural and Guangfulin Cultural, which was considered to be the cultural relics of New Stone Era in Taihu area; secondly, immigrants from the Yellow River were confirmed to be the first group of immigrants coming Shanghai; thirdly, there were towns in Shanghai dating back to as far as Zhou dynasty; fourthly, two unique types of houses in primitive society were found: stilt house and ground house.

== Guangfulin Relics Park ==
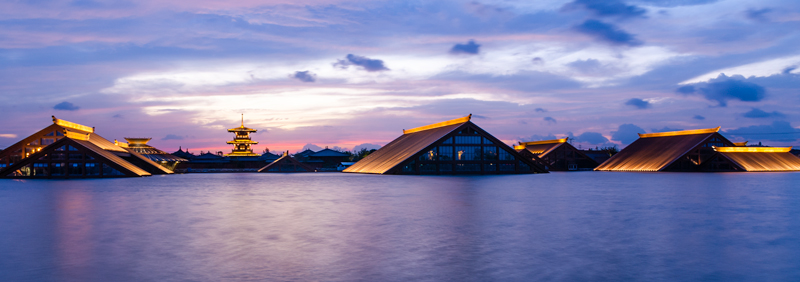
Guangfulin Relics Park

As of 2014, the Guangfulin Relics Park was under construction now, and was expected to open to the public in 2016. There are more than 20 attractive sites in it, such as museums like Gangfang in Ming dynasty and Yao Shun Yu Museum, a communication center, a scroll Room, Fulin Tower, an art exhibition area, a music fountain, Zhiye Temple, a play center and restaurants. In addition, by 2019, folk art exhibition halls and a religious cultural display center will be featured in the park.

=== Zhiye Temple ===
Zhiye Temple was named by a monk, Dazhi, during the Tang dynasty. Legend has it that, when Dazhi toured here from Luoyang, he was greatly attracted by the beautiful local scenery, so he decided to build a temple here to promote Buddhism and help local residents. After ten years, he completed his work, and named it Zhiye Temple. The temple is famous in Songjiang, and attracts many Buddhists.

=== Chen Zilong's tomb ===
Chen Zilong, a famous poet in the late Ming dynasty was buried here. The tombstone was established in order to memorize Chen Zilong, who had struggled to death against the Qing dynasty. He made great achievements in literature and poetry and composed many masterpieces, including Selected Huangming poems.
