= Gu Zhengyi =

Gu Zhengyi (simplified Chinese: 顾正谊; traditional Chinese: 顧正誼; pinyin: Gù Zhèngyì; Wade–Giles: Ku Cheng-i) was a famed Chinese painter active during the late Ming Dynasty and the early Qing Dynasty. His birth and death years are unknown. His style name was 'Zhongfan' (仲方) and his pseudonym was Tinglin (亭林). He was known for his literati paintings/ink wash paintings. He was a native Huating (now Songjiang, Shanghai). His style followed Huang Gongwang, and he was close with Song Xu and Sun Kehong.
