= Huzhu Pagoda =

Pagoda in Shanghai, China

Coordinates: 31.0762°N 121.1458°E

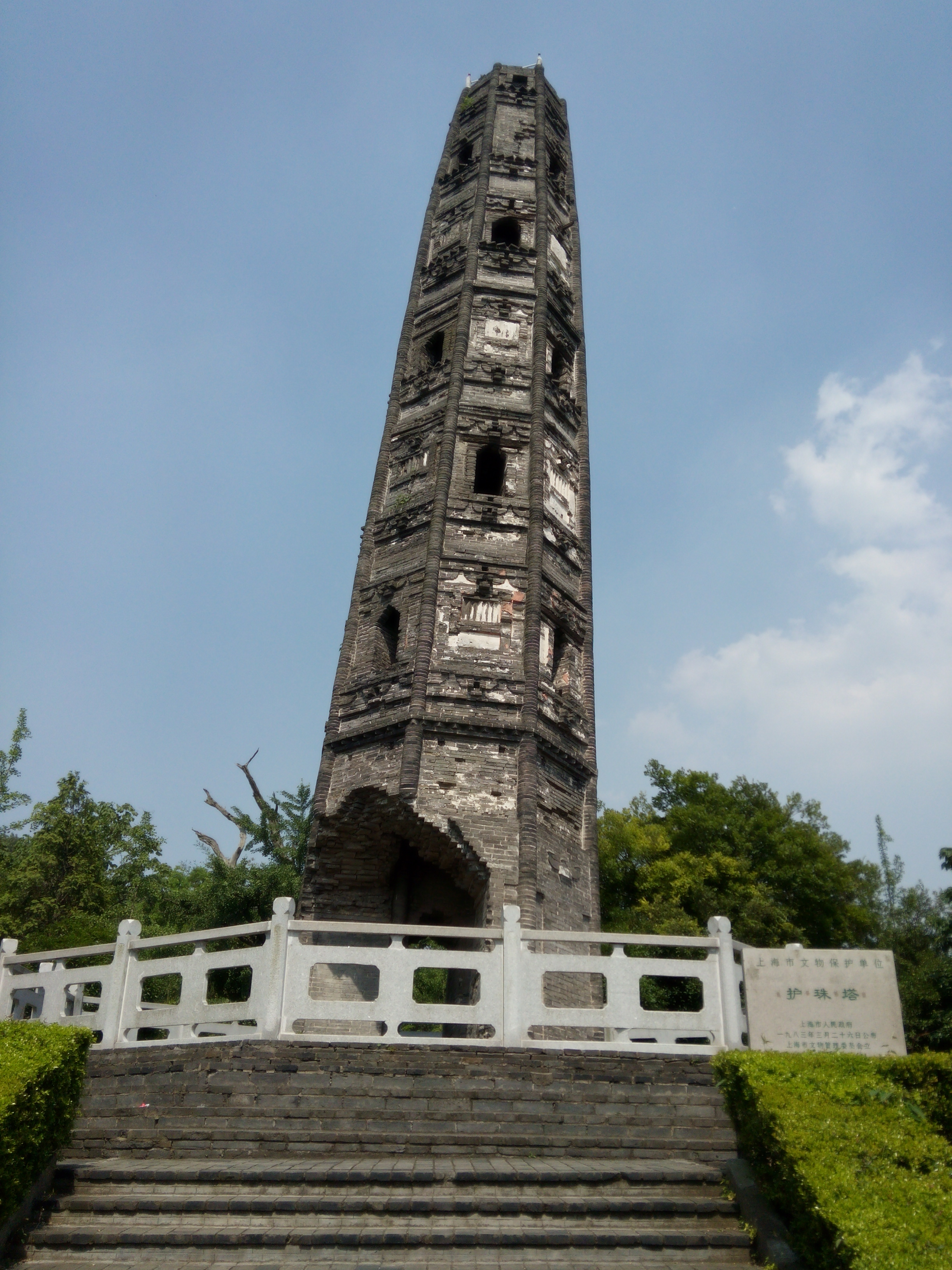
Huzhu Pagoda

Huzhu Pagoda (simplified Chinese: 护珠塔; traditional Chinese: 護珠塔; pinyin: Hùzhūtǎ) is a Chinese pagoda located on Tianmashan Hill in the Songjiang District of Shanghai. It is known for its leaning angle, surpassing that of the Leaning Tower of Pisa.

== History ==
The tower was built in 1079 during the Northern Song dynasty. Originally part of a building complex that was used to store Buddhist relics, a series of damaging fires left only the tower standing. It was named a cultural relic by the Shanghai government in 1983.

== Structure ==
The pagoda is an octahedral tower with seven levels and a height of around 20 meters. The tower leaned to the southeast at an angle of 6.51 degrees in 1982 and has since then tilted even further to an angle of 7.10 degrees. The top of the tower is displaced 2.27 meters from the position it would have if the structure was aligned perfectly. The leaning is most likely caused by the tower being built on two different surfaces, with one side on the mountain's bedrock and the other on stone ballast.

== See also ==
- Tiger Hill Pagoda
