= Xia Wanchun =

Ming dynasty poet and soldier

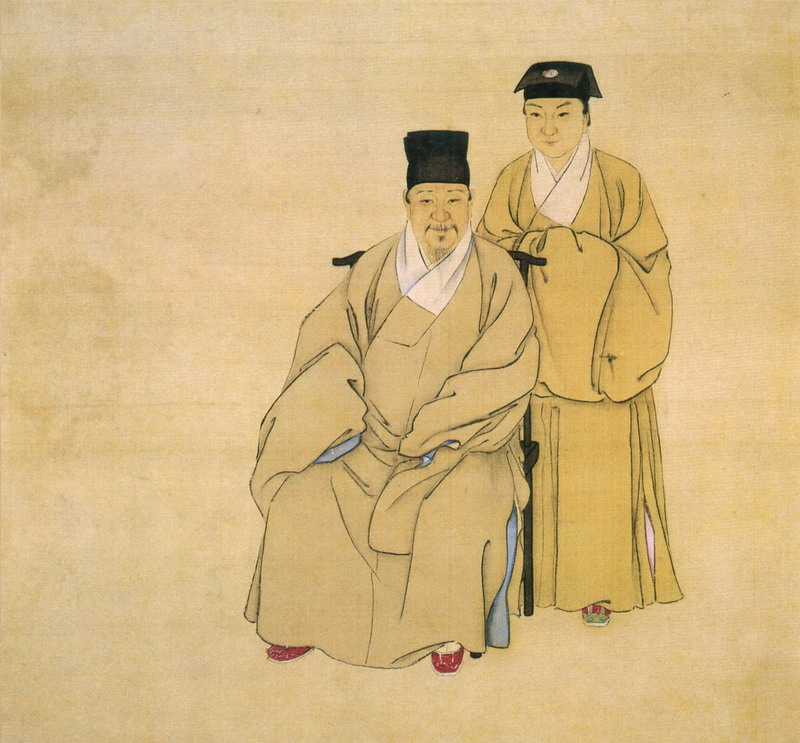
Xia Wanchun with his father, Xia Yunyi.

Xia Wanchun (Chinese: 夏完淳; pinyin: Xià Wánchun; 4 October 1631 – 16 October 1647) was a Ming dynasty poet and soldier. The son of Xia Yunyi and a child prodigy, Xia began writing poetry at a young age and died aged 17 while resisting the Manchu invaders.

== Biography ==
Xia Wanchun established himself as a prodigious poet from a young age. He began writing poetry at age seven and was a disciple of Chen Zilong. At age nine, Xia could already produce fu verses in the ancient style. Xia's ci poems are noted for their "enthusiasm and pathos", with one such poem titled "Plucking Mulberries" reading:

Willow catkins are swept up by wind and rain
Down on the ground, they roll like blobs of cotton
Down on the ground, they roll like blobs of cotton,
Revealing the spring breeze's weakness at the pavilion.
Privately I relate my painful memory of a lost country
To the Yangtze River that flows to the east
Its whole length being filled with my grief.

— Translation by Yuan Singpei

At age 15, alongside his father, Xia joined the army in its anti-Qing campaign. He wrote of the fallen Ming soldiers: "Men of wisdom are dispersed like clouds, the state lies in ruins, alas! I have written eighteen jueju poems, and the pathos of these short songs exceeds that of any long lament. Only those endowed with qing are able to speak like this!" Like his father, Xia was killed by Manchu soldiers.
