= Dacang Bridge =

Bridge in Songjiang, Shanghai, China

Dacang Bridge 大仓桥
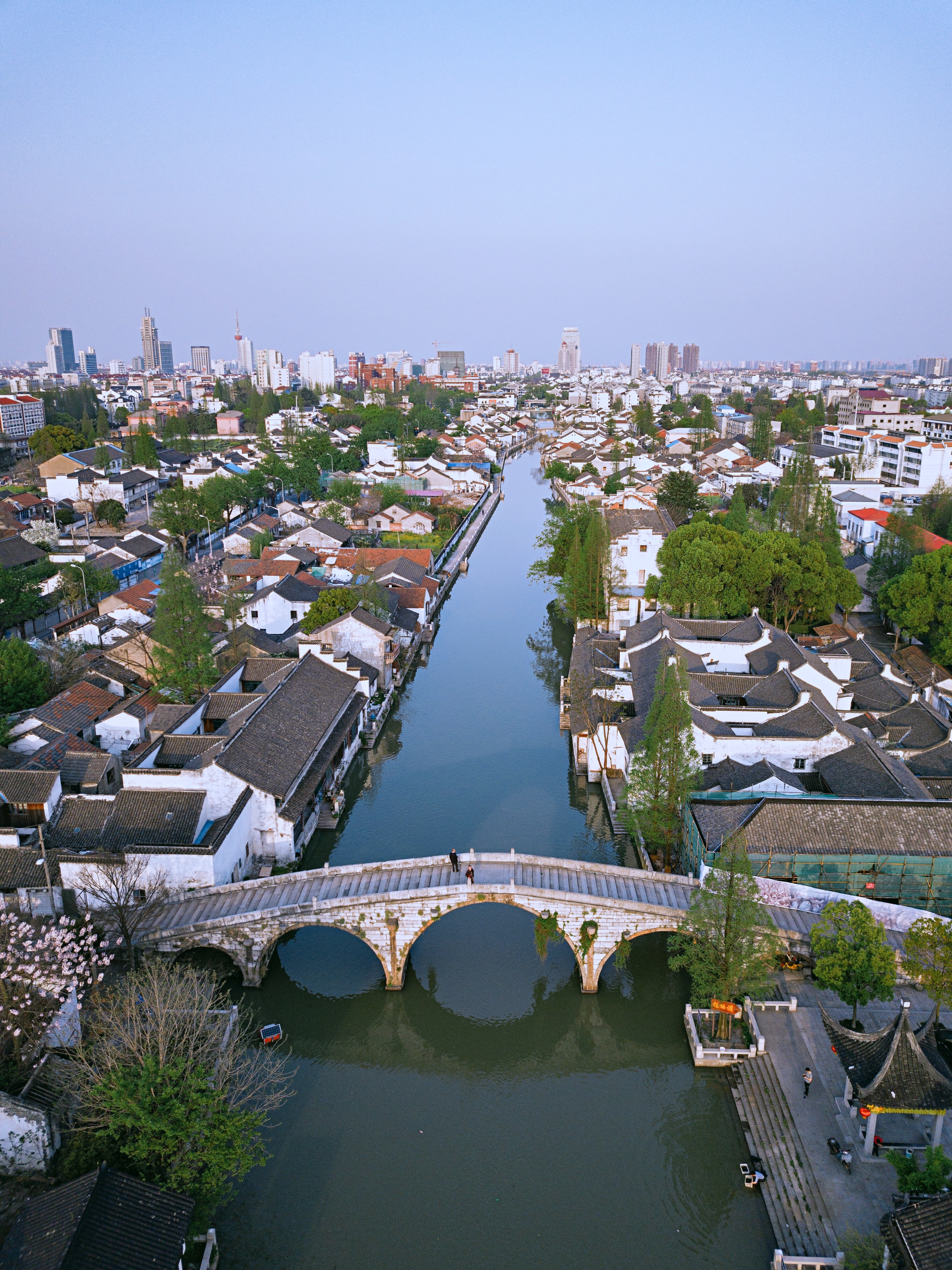
- Dacang Bridge in April 2019
- Coordinates: 31°00′27.61″N 121°12′17.38″E
- Carries: Pedestrians and bicycles
- Crosses: Old City River
- Locale: Songjiang District of Shanghai, China

Characteristics
- Design: Arch bridge
- Material: Stone
- Total length: 50 metres (160 ft)
- Width: 5 metres (16 ft)
- Height: 8 metres (26 ft)

History
- Construction end: 1626

Location
- Interactive map of Dacang Bridge

The Dacang Bridge (simplified Chinese: 大仓桥; traditional Chinese: 大倉橋; pinyin: Dàcāng Qiáo) is a historic stone arch bridge over the Old City River in Songjiang District of Shanghai, China.

== History ==
Dacang Bridge was built in 1626 during the late Ming dynasty (1368–1644). In April 2014, it has been classified as a municipal-level cultural heritage site by the Government of Shanghai.

== Gallery ==
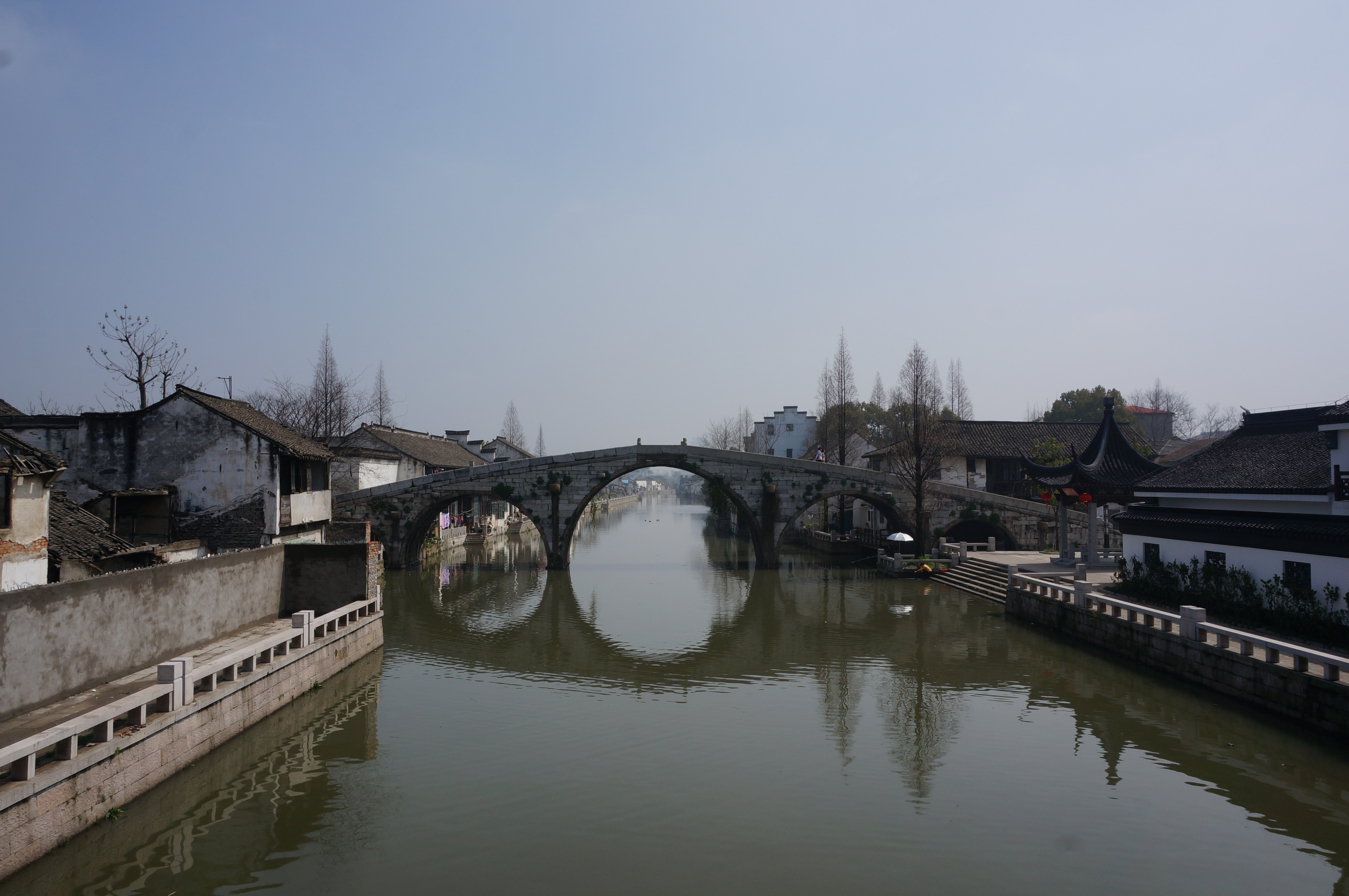
Dacang Bridge in March 2015

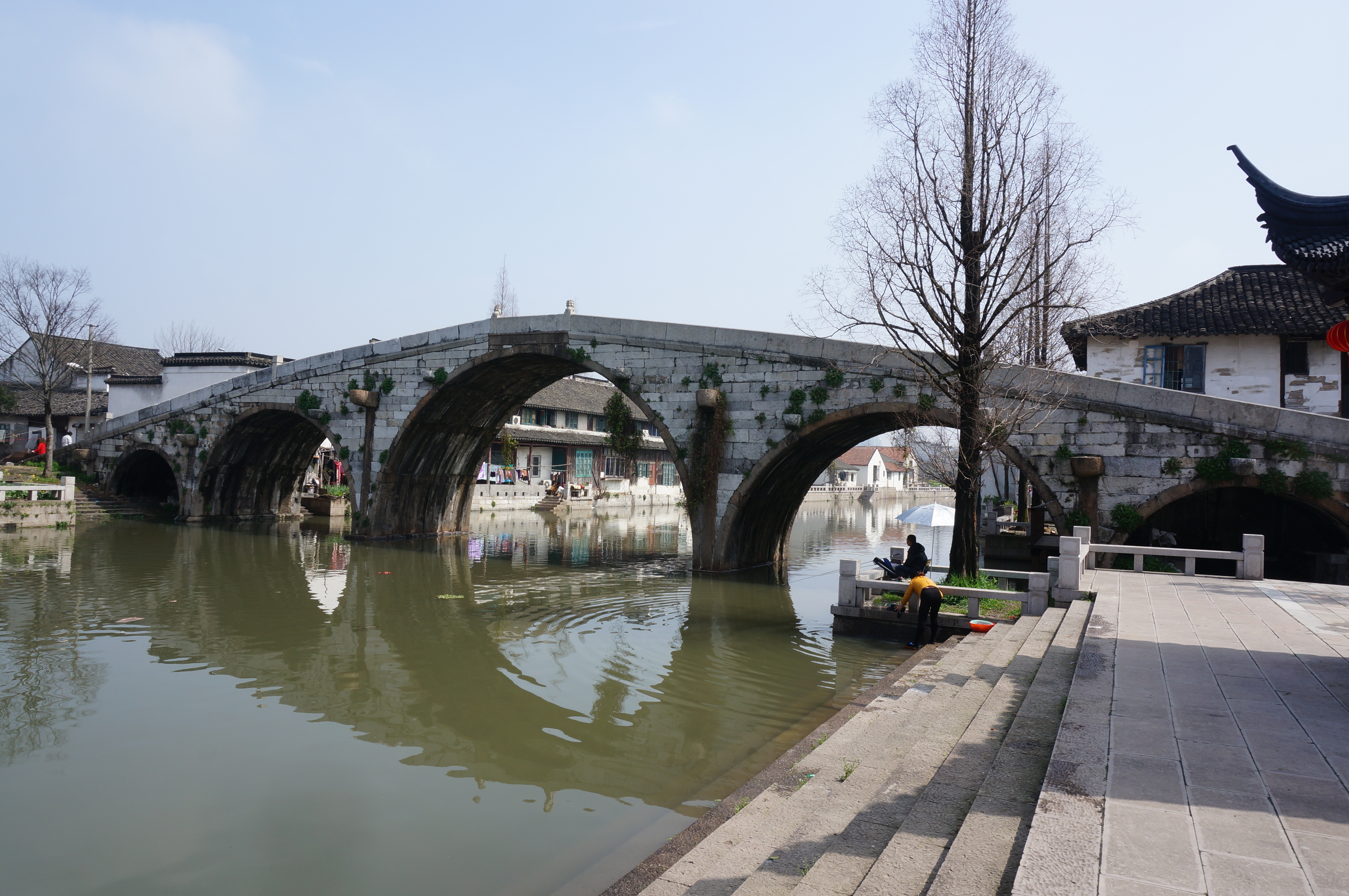
Dacang Bridge in March 2015

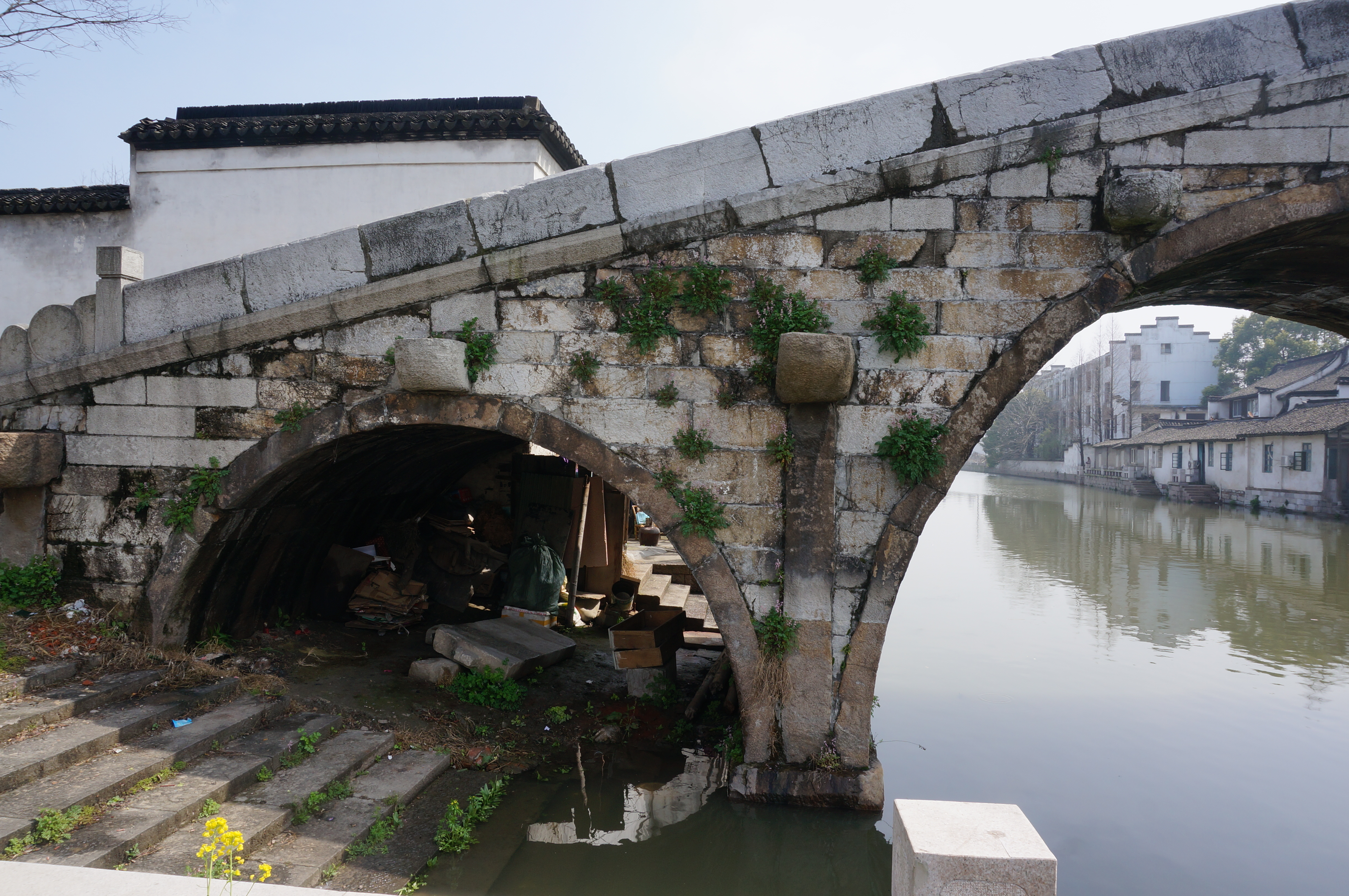
Dacang Bridge in March 2015

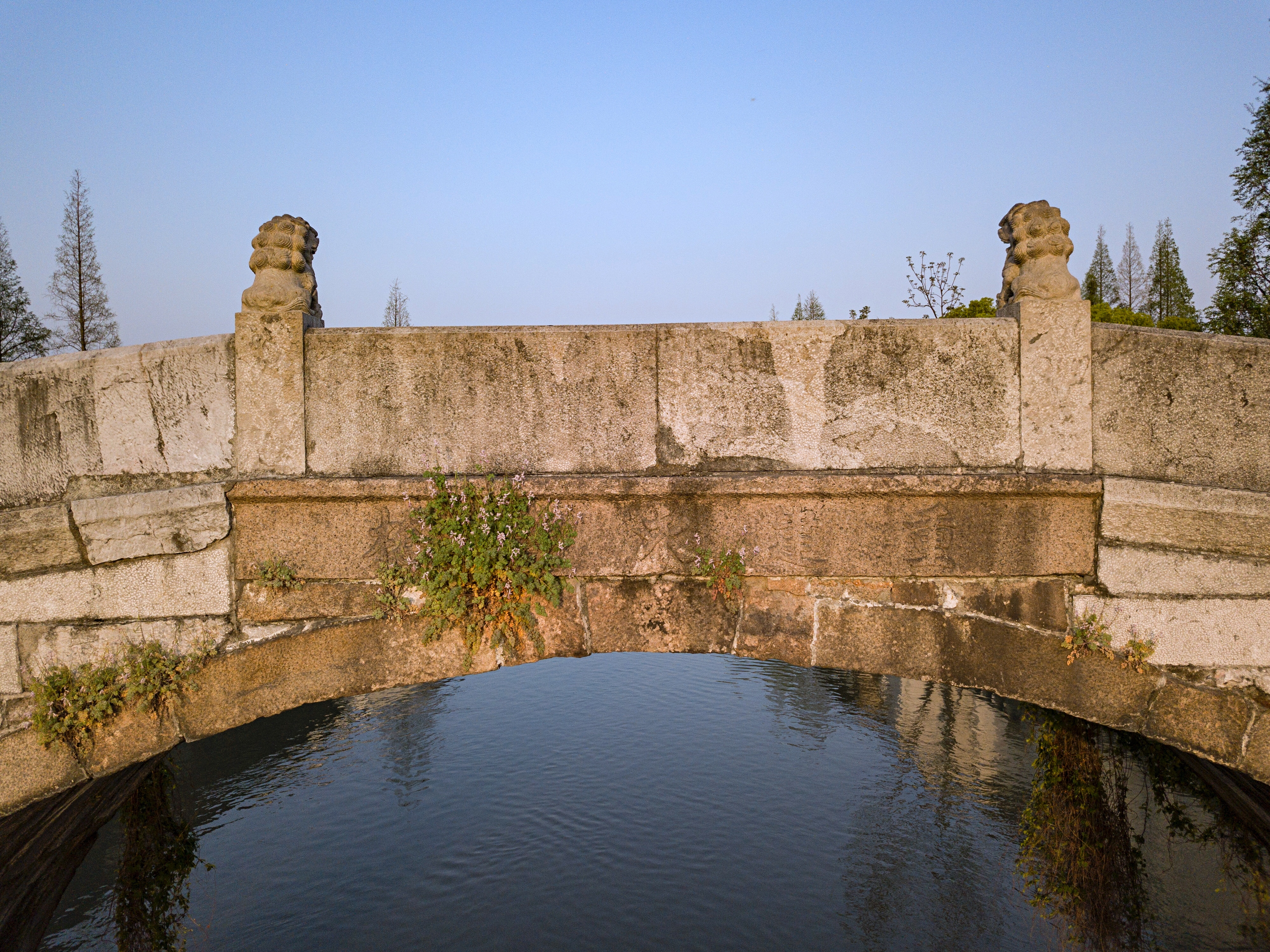
Dacang Bridge in March 2015

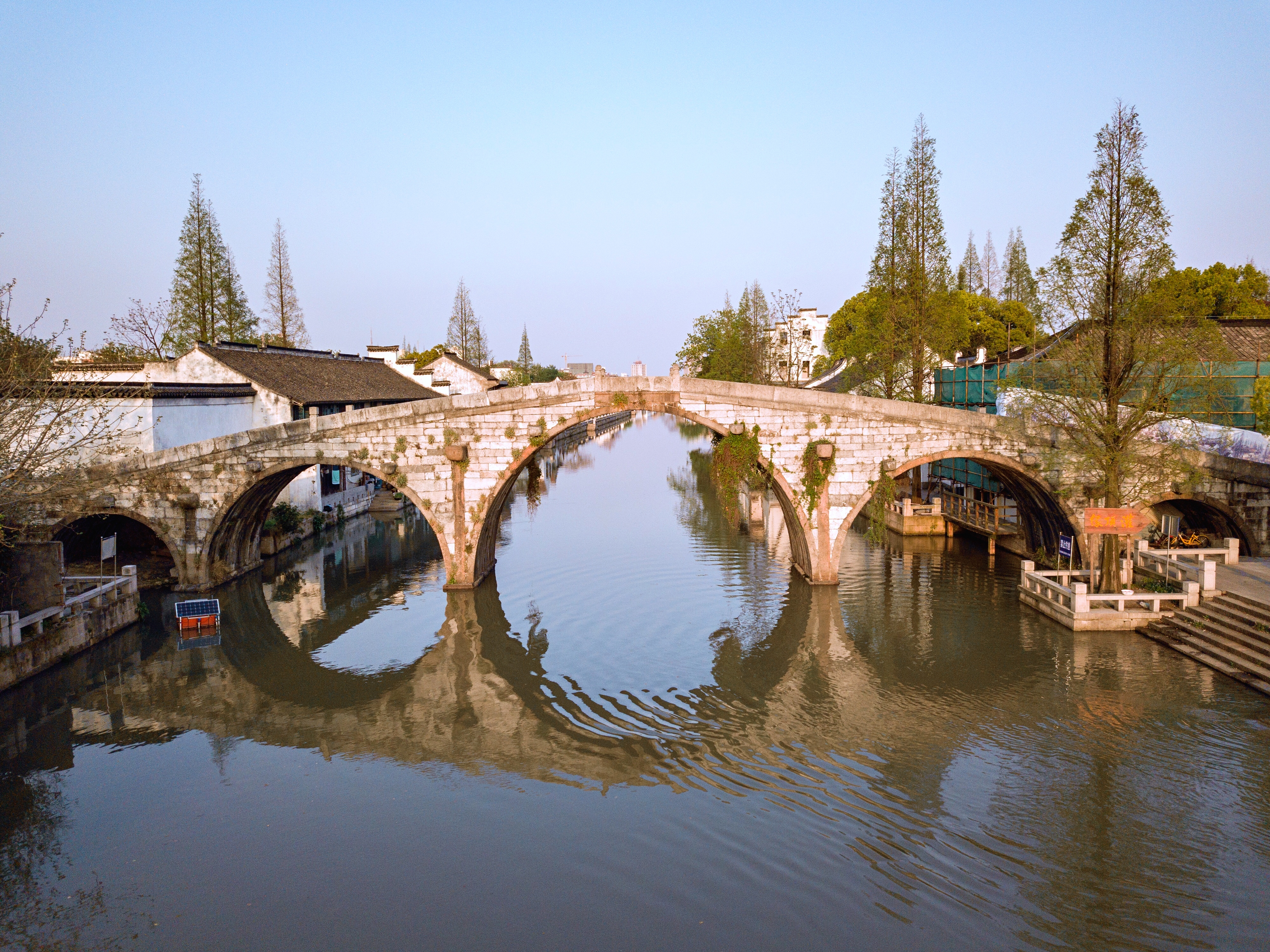
Dacang Bridge in March 2015
