= Zhao Zuo =

Chinese painter

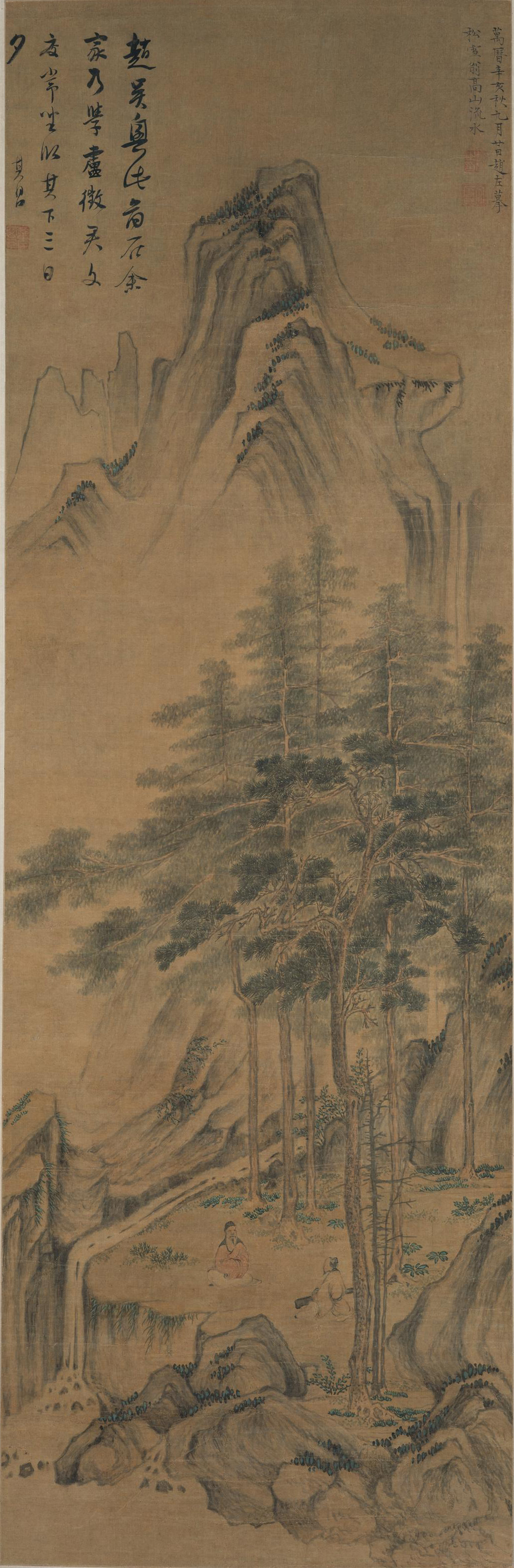
Zhao Zuo, Landscape of Quick Water from High Mountain, Shanghai Museum, 1611

Zhao Zuo (simplified Chinese: 赵左; traditional Chinese: 趙左; pinyin: Zhào Zuǒ; Wade–Giles: Chao Tso), a native of Huating (华亭, now Songjiang, Shanghai) was a noted Chinese painter in Ming dynasty. His birth and death years are unknown. His style name was 'Wendu' (文度).

Zhao specialized in painting landscapes with a rich and pure brushstroke style. He followed Song Xu and was one of the representative painters of "The Su Song Style" (苏松派).
