= Xia Yunyi =

Ming dynasty poet

Xia Yunyi (Chinese: 夏允彝) (1596–1645) was a Ming dynasty poet. He was born in Songjiang (now a district in Shanghai). He was magistrate of Changle County. An opponent of the Qing dynasty, he supported the Southern Ming dynasty. He committed suicide.
