= Dongling =

Dongling may refer to:

- Eastern Qing tombs, or Dongling of Hebei
- Fuling Tomb, also known as Eastern Tomb (Dongling), Shenyang
- Hunnan District, formerly Dongling (named after Eastern Tomb), Shenyang, China
- Dongling, Hui'an County (东岭镇), town in Hui'an County, Fujian, China
- Dongling Group (东岭集团)
- Dongling Vibration (东菱振动), Chinese manufacturing company

== See also ==
- Donglin (disambiguation)
