= Shanghai Rail Transit =

Rail transit lines operating in Shanghai

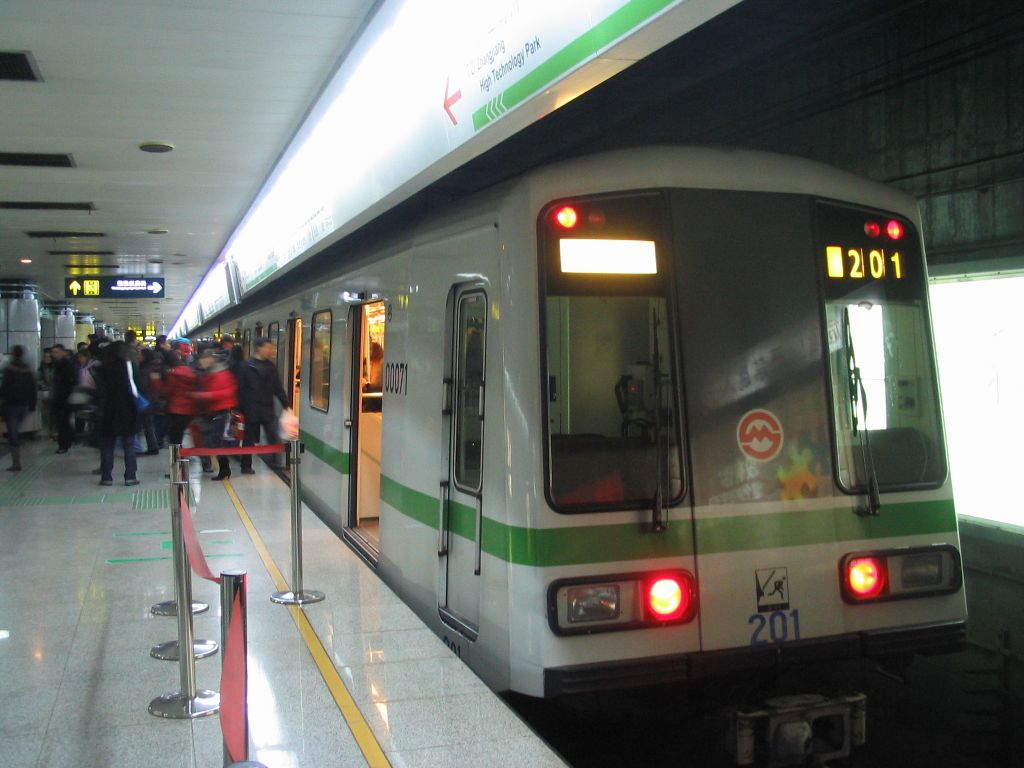
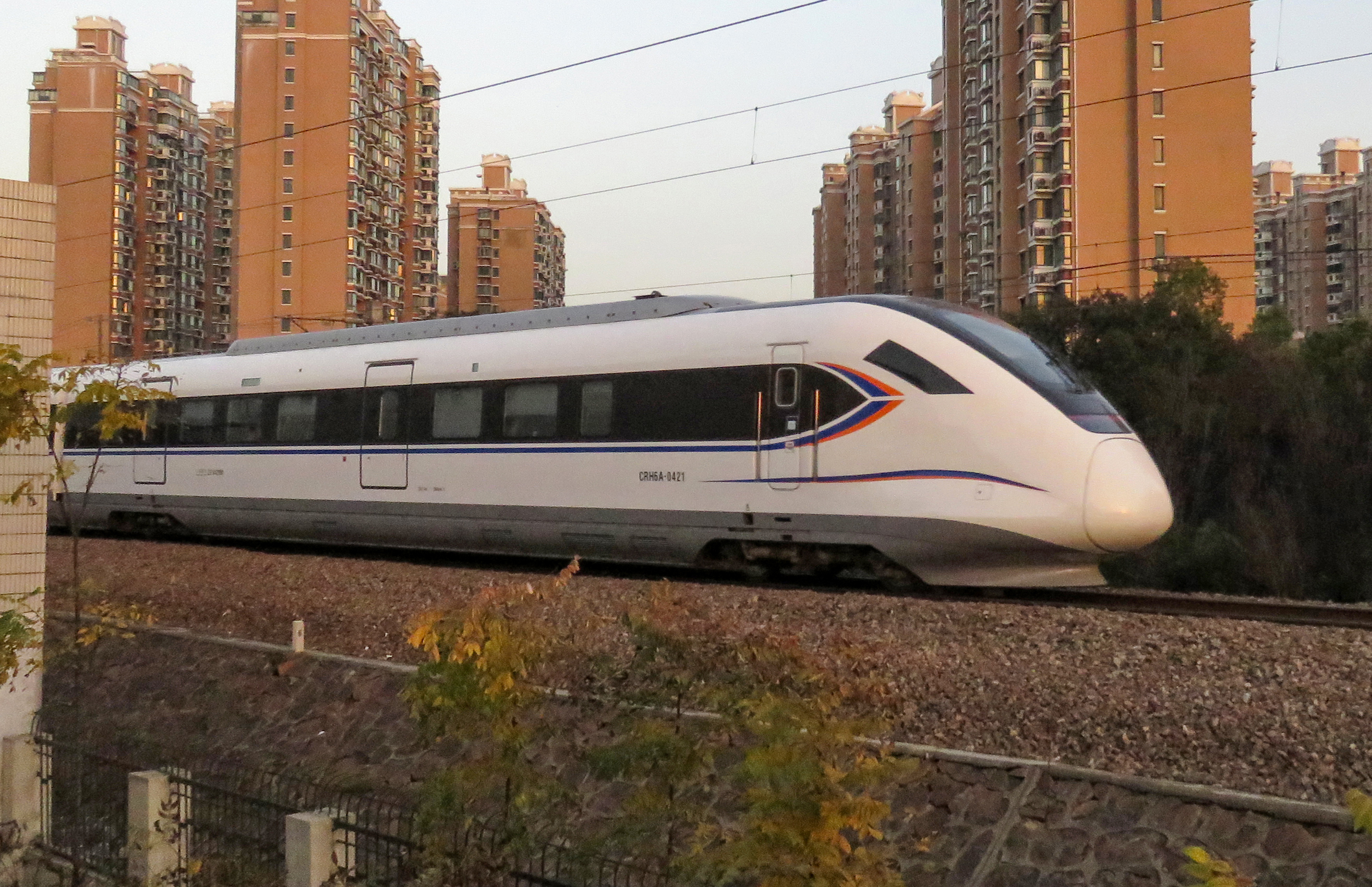
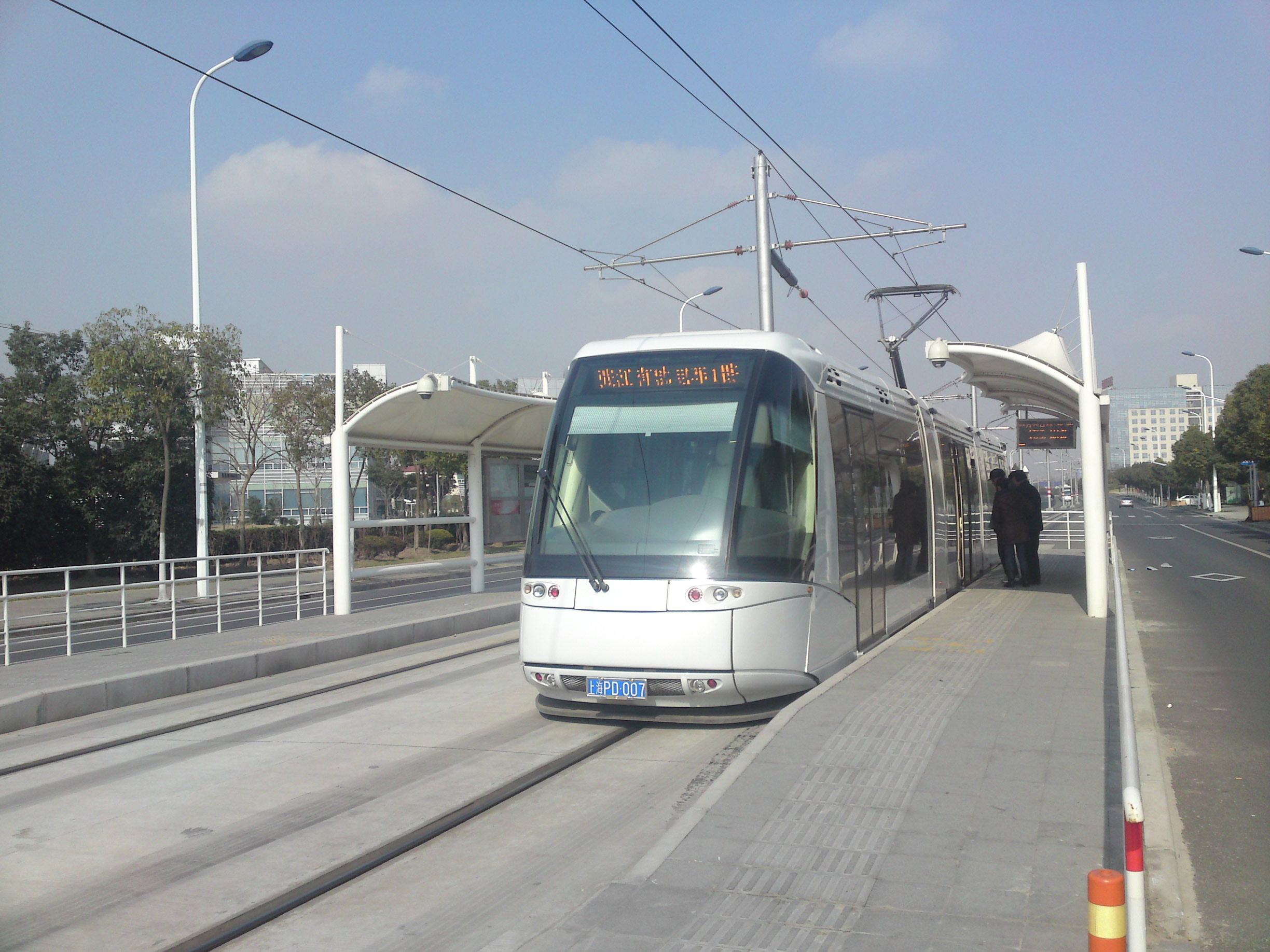
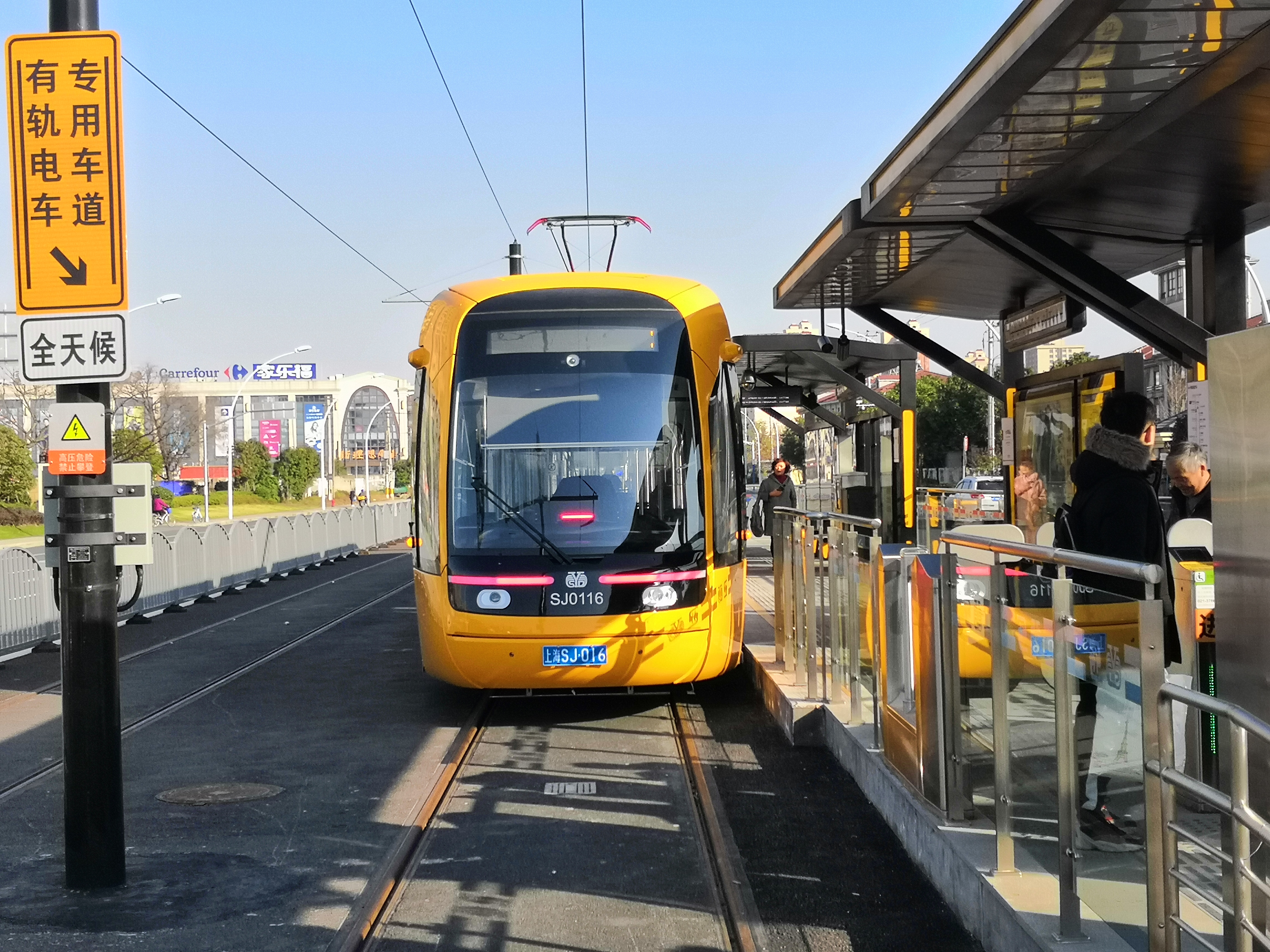
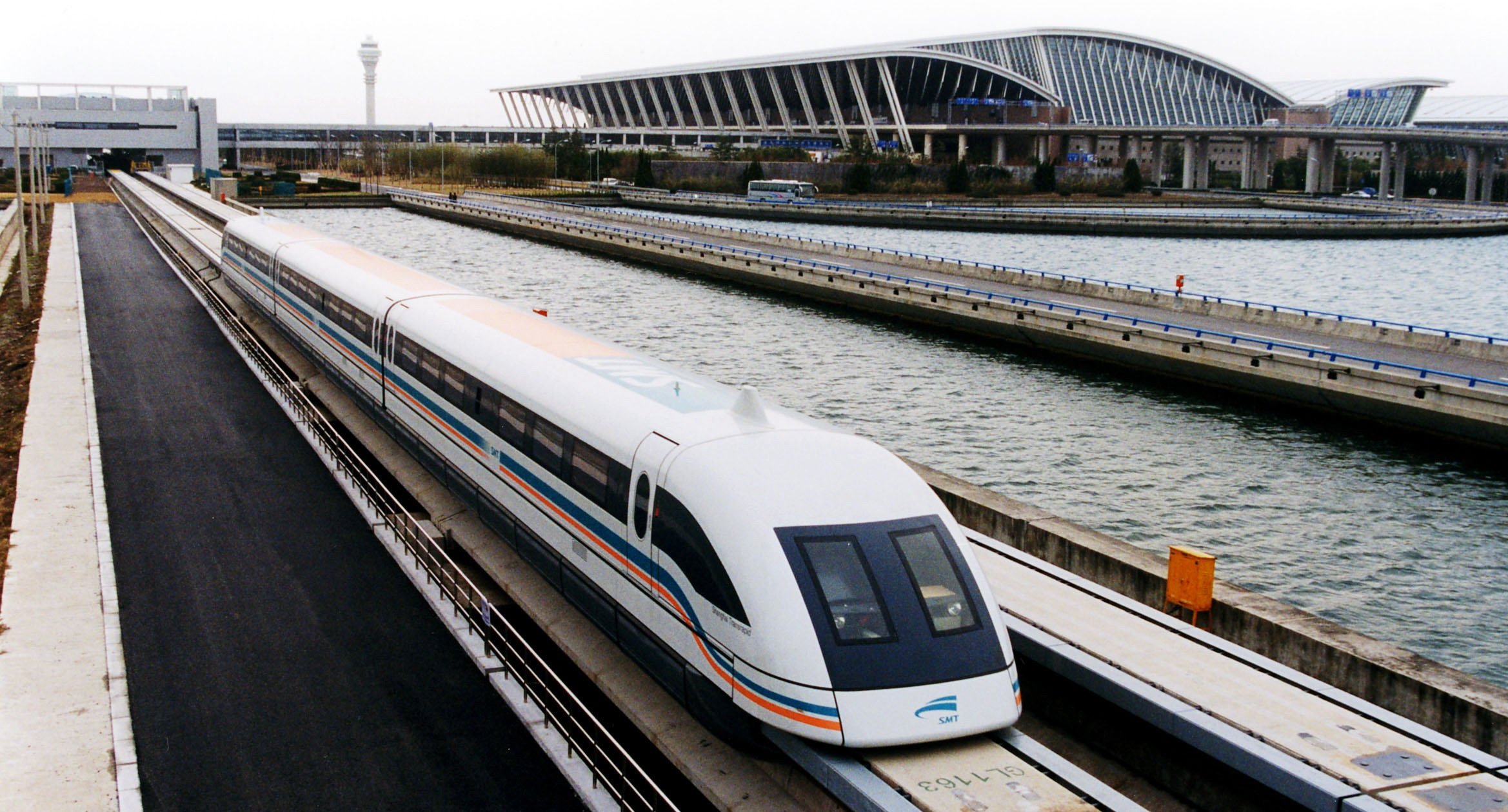
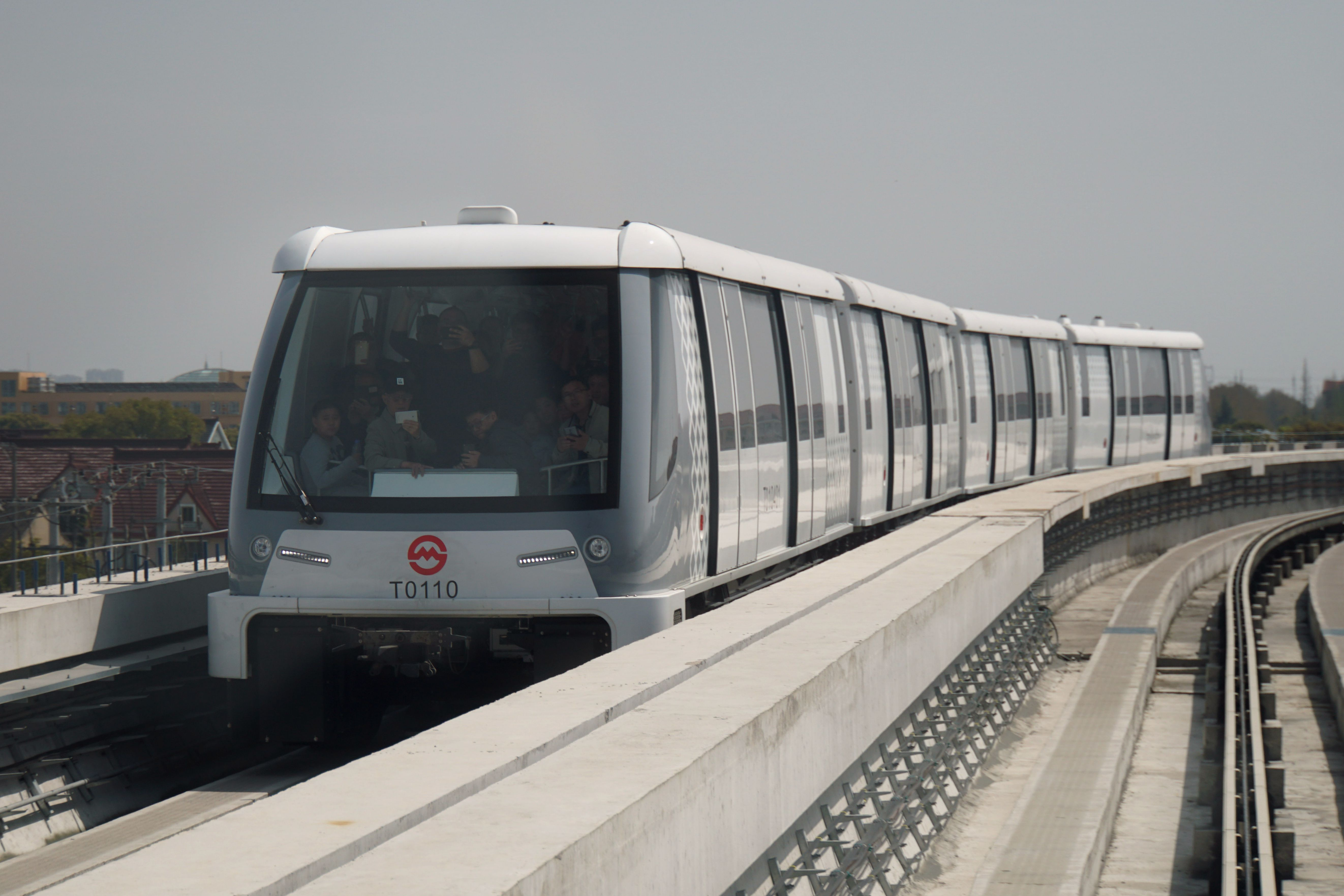
- Clockwise from top left: Shanghai Metro Line 2 train passes through People's Square station; CRH6A train running on Jinshan Railway; Songjiang Tram line 1 vehicle passes through Canghua Road Station; Pujiang line during operation; Shanghai maglev train leaves Shanghai Pudong International Airport; Zhangjiang Tram enters station

Overview
- Locale: Shanghai, China
- Transit type: Urban rail transit
- Number of lines: 26 (Note: Shanghai Metro lines 1–13 and 15–18, Jinshan Line, Songjiang Tram lines 1 and 2, PVG People Mover east and west lines, Shanghai Maglev Line, and Pujiang Line.)

Operation
- Began operation: May 28, 1993; 33 years ago (Note: Shanghai Metro Line 1.)
- Operators: Shanghai Shentong Metro Group Co., Ltd.; Kunshan Rail Transit; China Railway Shanghai Group; Shanghai Pudong Modern Rail Transit Co., Ltd.; Shanghai Songjiang Tram Investment and Operation Co., Ltd.; Shanghai Keolis, and Shanghai Maglev Transportation Development Co., Ltd.
System map
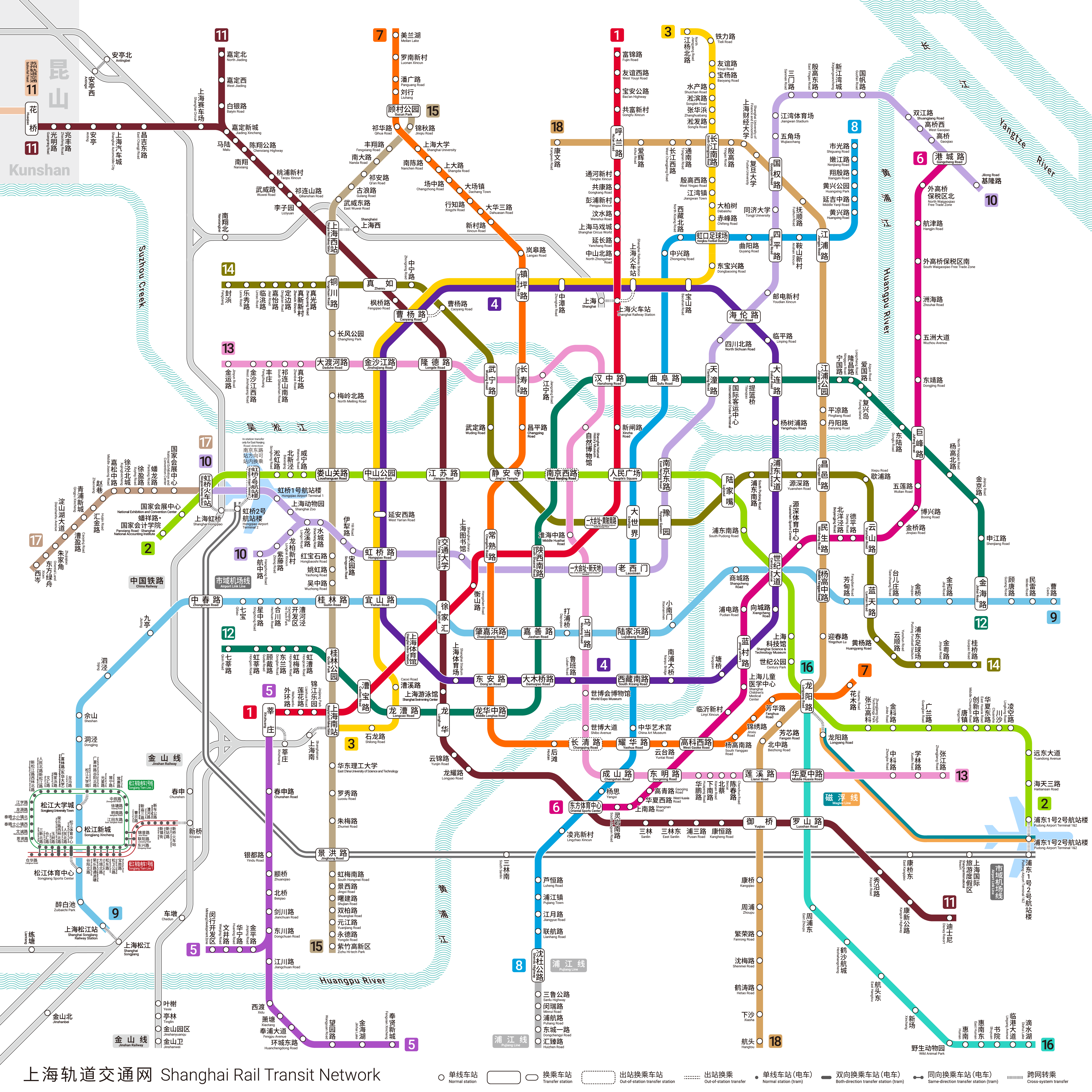

Shanghai Rail Transit includes all rail transit lines operating in Shanghai, mainly composed of High-volume railway system, Low-to-medium-volume railway system and Maglev system. The system was established on May 28, 1993, when Shanghai Metro Line 1 opened.

== Overview ==
The Shanghai Metro is the biggest component of the Shanghai metropolitan rail transit network, together with the Shanghai maglev train, the Songjiang Tram, the Shanghai Pudong Airport APM, and the commuter rail Jinshan railway operated by China Railway Shanghai Group.

Shanghai metropolitan rail transit network	Commencement	Latest extension	Number of lines	System length	Number of stations
Shanghai Suburban Railway	2012	Ongoing	2	115 km (71.5 mi)	15
Shanghai maglev train	2002	Ongoing	1	29.5 km (18.3 mi)	2
Shanghai Metro	1993	2025	19	816 km (507.0 mi)	513
Songjiang Tram	2018	2019	2	39.4 km (24.5 mi)	42
Shanghai Pudong Airport APM	2019	Ongoing	2	7.8 km (4.8 mi)	4
Total			26	1,007.7 km (626.2 mi)	576

== High-volume railway system ==
=== Shanghai Metro ===
Shanghai Metro was opened on May 28, 1993 and is one of the busiest urban rail transit systems in the world, providing public transport services to 14 municipal districts (Note: Huangpu, Xuhui, Changning, Jing’an, Putuo, Hongkou, Yangpu, Minhang, Baoshan, Jiading, Pudong New Area, Songjiang, Qingpu, and Fengxian.) in Shanghai and Kunshan City in Jiangsu Province. Except the Shanghai maglev train and the Pujiang Line, the other seventeen lines (737 km (458.0 mi)) of the Shanghai Metro are all heavy rails. These lines are operated by Shanghai Shentong Metro Group Co., Ltd., except the Huaqiao section of Line 11, which is operated by Kunshan Rail Transit Co., Ltd. The daily operating hours of Shanghai Metro are approximately from 5:00 to 24:00. (Note: There are certain differences in each line.)

==== Rubber-tyred system ====
Pujiang Line was opened on March 31, 2018, with a total length of 6.69 km (4.16 mi) and 6 stations. It is operated by Shanghai Keolis, with daily service hours from 5:40 (Note: Depart from Huizhen Road Station.) to 22:30. (Note: Depart from Shendu Highway Station.)

=== Shanghai Suburban Railway ===
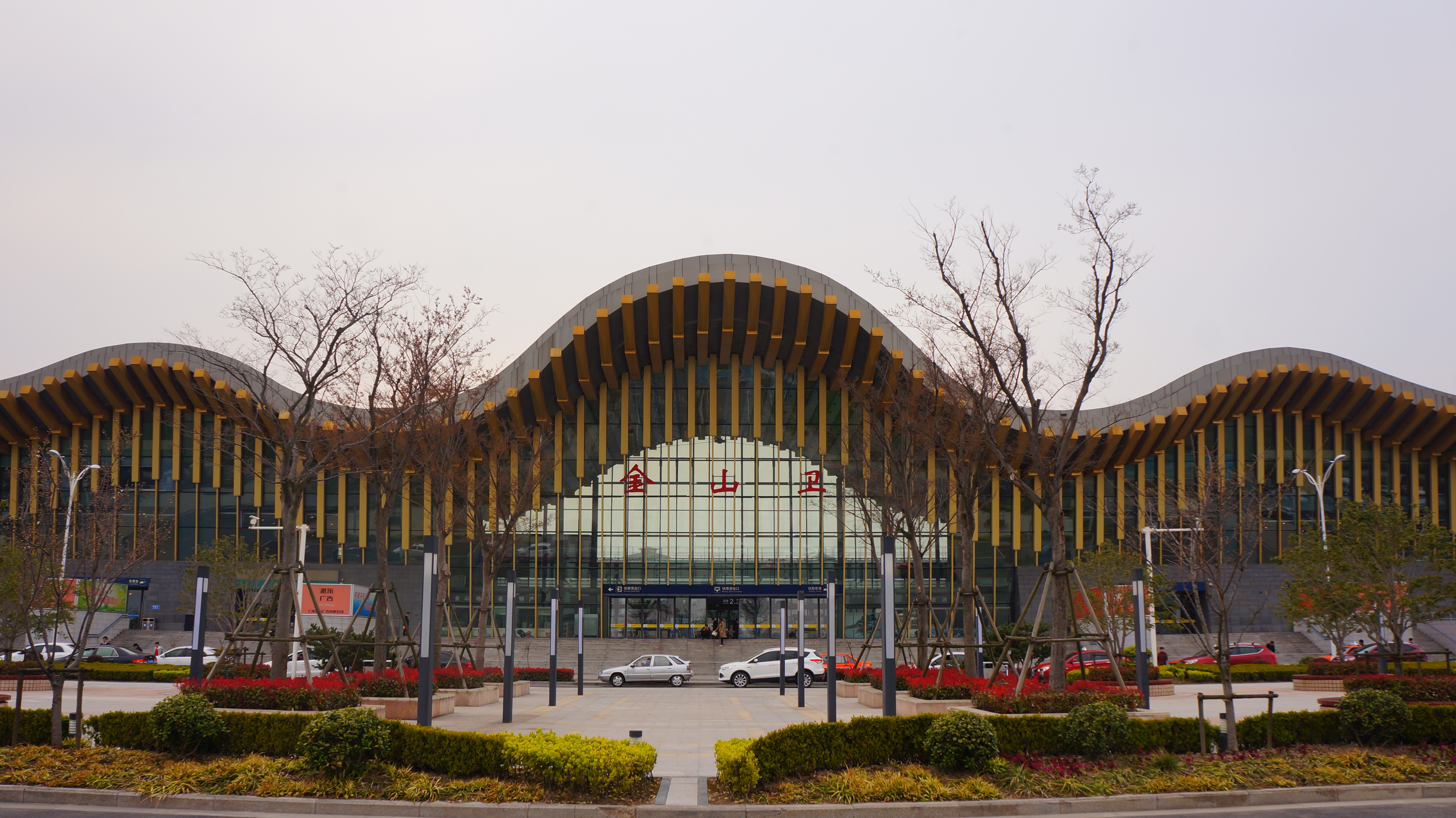
South Hall of Jinshanwei railway station

Shanghai Metropolitan Area Intercity Railway currently consists of the Jinshan Railway, also known as Jinshan Line passing through Xuhui, Minhang, Songjiang and Jinshan districts, and the Airport Link Line running between Hongqiao Airport Terminal 2 and the Shanghai Pudong International Airport, thereby connecting the city's two airports.

The Jinshan Line is operated by the China Railway Shanghai Group. The daily operating time is from 6:00 (Note: Depart from Jinshanwei Station and stop at each station.) to 21:55. (Note: Depart from Jinshanwei Station without stopping midway.) On weekdays, there is another direct train from Shanghai South Station at 5:30. It takes 32 to 60 minutes from the starting station, Jinshanwei Station, to the final station, Shanghai South Station, depending on the number of stops on the way. The starting fare is 3 yuan, and the full fare is 10 yuan. Jinshan Line is one of the Shanghai suburban railway lines.

In addition to paper tickets, passengers can also use Shanghai Public Transport Card, (Note: Physical or virtual card.) near-field communication (NFC), and mobile phone boarding code (Note: Through apps from Shanghai Public Transport Card, QuickPass, WeChat, Alipay, etc.) to enter the station. The transfer discount policy for Shanghai public transport service is applicable in this line. Four lines are under construction as of 2026.

== Low-to-medium-volume railway system ==
=== Songjiang Tram ===
Songjiang Tram Line 2 vehicles approaching Ronghui Road Station

Songjiang Tram was opened on December 26, 2018, passing through the Songjiang and Minhang districts of Shanghai. It has two lines operated by Shanghai Songjiang Tram Investment Operation Co., Ltd., and Shanghai Keolis, with a total length of about 30 km (19 mi). Songjiang tram uses the French Alstom Citadis 302 tramcar, with five carriages and a maximum capacity of about 300 passengers. Chengdu Tram Line 2 uses the same vehicle model. The fare for 10 km or less is 2 yuan. For more than 10 km (6.2 mi), the fare increases by 1 yuan for every 10 km (6.2 mi). The transfer discount policy for Shanghai public transport service is applicable in this line.

=== Shanghai Pudong Airport APM ===
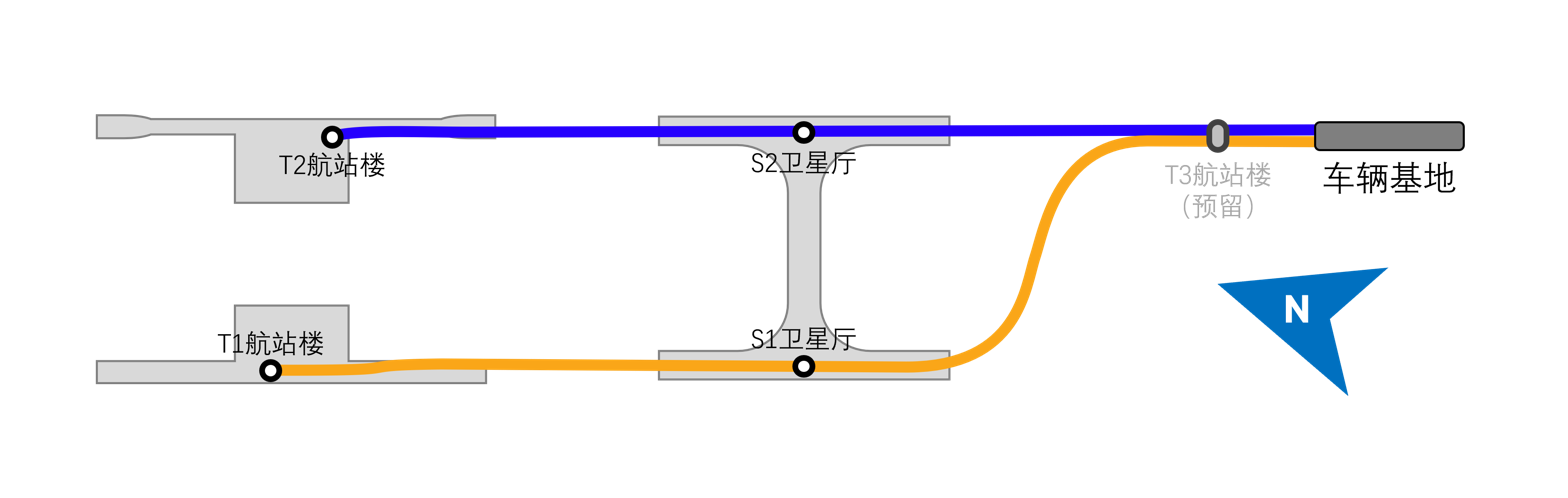
Route map of Shanghai Pudong Airport APM

Shanghai Pudong Airport APM is a People Mover opened on September 16, 2019, using A-type metro train system with four cars, runs inside Shanghai Pudong International Airport, including the East Line and the West Line. The operating section of the East Line is 1.65 km (1.03 mi) long, connecting Terminal 2 and Satellite 2, and the operating section of the West Line is 1.86 km (1.16 mi) long, connecting Terminal 1 and Satellite 1. Shanghai Keolis operates this transit system.

== Maglev system ==
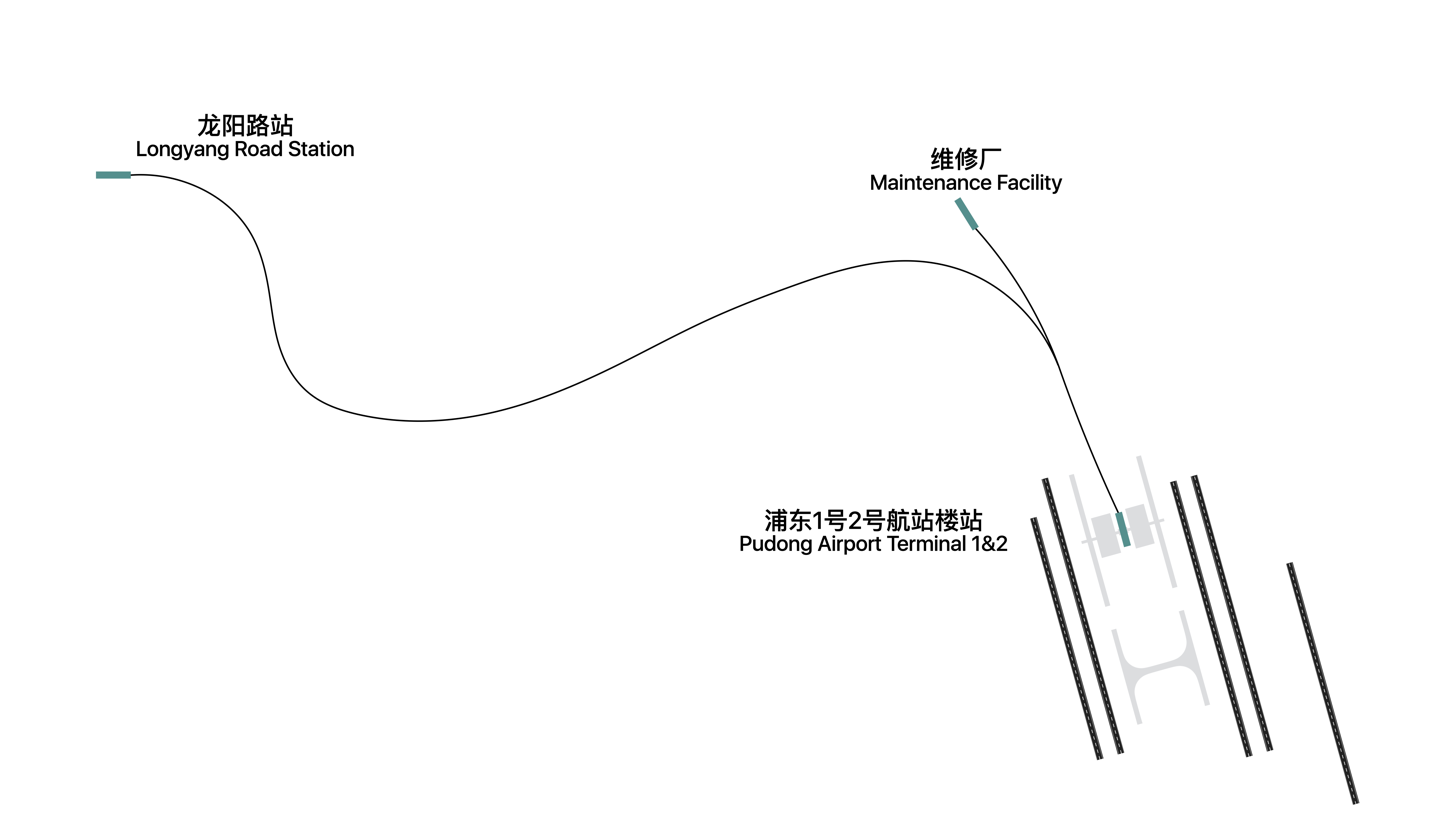
Route map of Shanghai Maglev Line

Shanghai Maglev Line was opened on December 31, 2002, with a total length of 30.5 km (19.0 mi) and two stations. It is operated by Shanghai Maglev Transportation Development Co., Ltd., and its daily service hours are from 6:40 (Note: Depart from Longyang Road Station.) to 21:42. (Note: Depart from Pudong International Airport Station.) Except for the 15-minute interval between the first two trains from Longyang Road Station, the interval for other trains is 20 minutes. An ordinary one-way ticket is 50 yuan, and the passenger holding an air ticket or Shanghai Public Transport Card can enjoy a 20% discount (40 yuan).

== Closed Lines ==
=== Zhangjiang Tram ===
Schematic diagram of Translohr tram wheel and rail structure

Zhangjiang Tram was opened on December 31, 2009. The whole line is located in Shanghai’s Pudong New Area. It is about 10 km (6.2 mi) long and has 15 stations. Zhangjiang tram adopts the French Translohr tram system, with low floor, monorail guidance, rubber wheels, three carriages, and a maximum capacity of about 167 passengers. TEDA Modern Guided Rail Tram in Tianjin uses the same transit system. The line is operated by Shanghai Pudong Modern Rail Transit Co., Ltd., with daily operating hours from 5:45 to 23:00, and a full fare of 2 yuan for the whole line. The transfer discount policy for Shanghai public transport service is applicable in this line. The Zhangjiang Tram closed in 2023 due to lack of demand and oversaturation of metro networks in Zhangjiang.

== See also ==
- List of airports in Shanghai
- List of metro systems
- List of tram and light rail transit systems
