= Tinglin railway station =

Railway station in Shanghai, China

Coordinates: 30°53′41″N 121°21′31″E

Tinglin 亭林
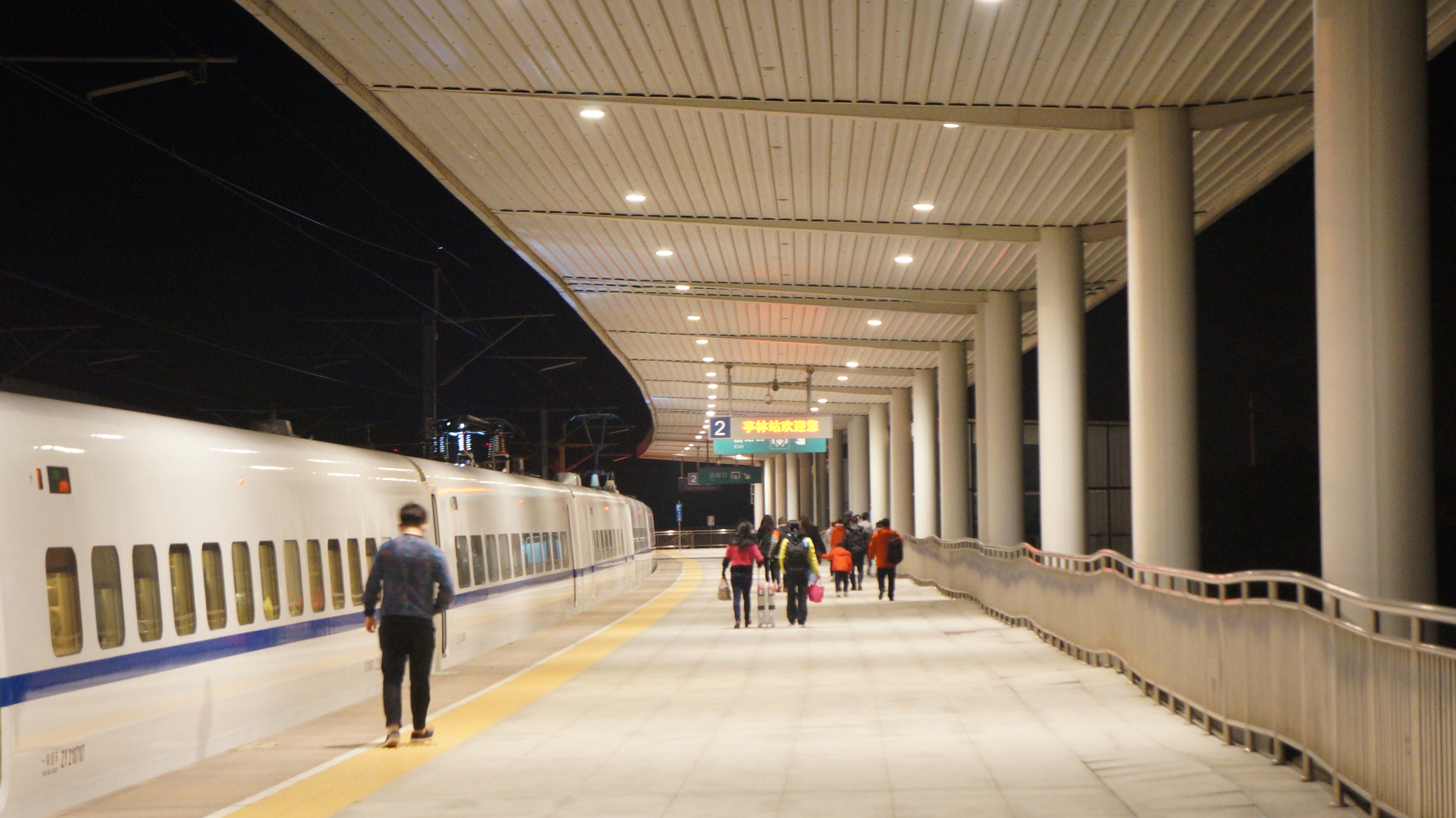
- Platform 2 at night

General information
- Location: Jinshan District, Shanghai; China
- Line: Jinshan Railway

History
- Opened: September 28, 2012

Services
Preceding station	China Railway	Following station
Yexie towards Shanghai South	Jinshan railway	Jinshan Industrial Park towards Jinshanwei
Location
- Location within Shanghai

Tinglin (Chinese: 亭林; pinyin: Tínglín) is a railway station on the Jinshan railway in Jinshan District, Shanghai. It opened for intercity passenger service on September 28, 2012.
