= Chedun railway station =

Railway station in Shanghai, China

Coordinates: 31°00′19″N 121°19′15″E

Chedun 车墩
- Station exterior

General information
- Location: Songjiang District, Shanghai; China
- Line: Jinshan Railway

History
- Opened: September 28, 2012

Services
Preceding station	China Railway	Following station
Xinqiao towards Shanghai South	Jinshan railway	Yexie towards Jinshanwei
Location
- Location within Shanghai

Chedun (simplified Chinese: 车墩; traditional Chinese: 車墩; pinyin: Chēdūn) is a railway station on the Jinshan railway in Songjiang District, Shanghai. It opened for intercity passenger service on September 28, 2012.
