= Jinshan Railway =

Jinshan Railway 金山铁路
- Jinshan
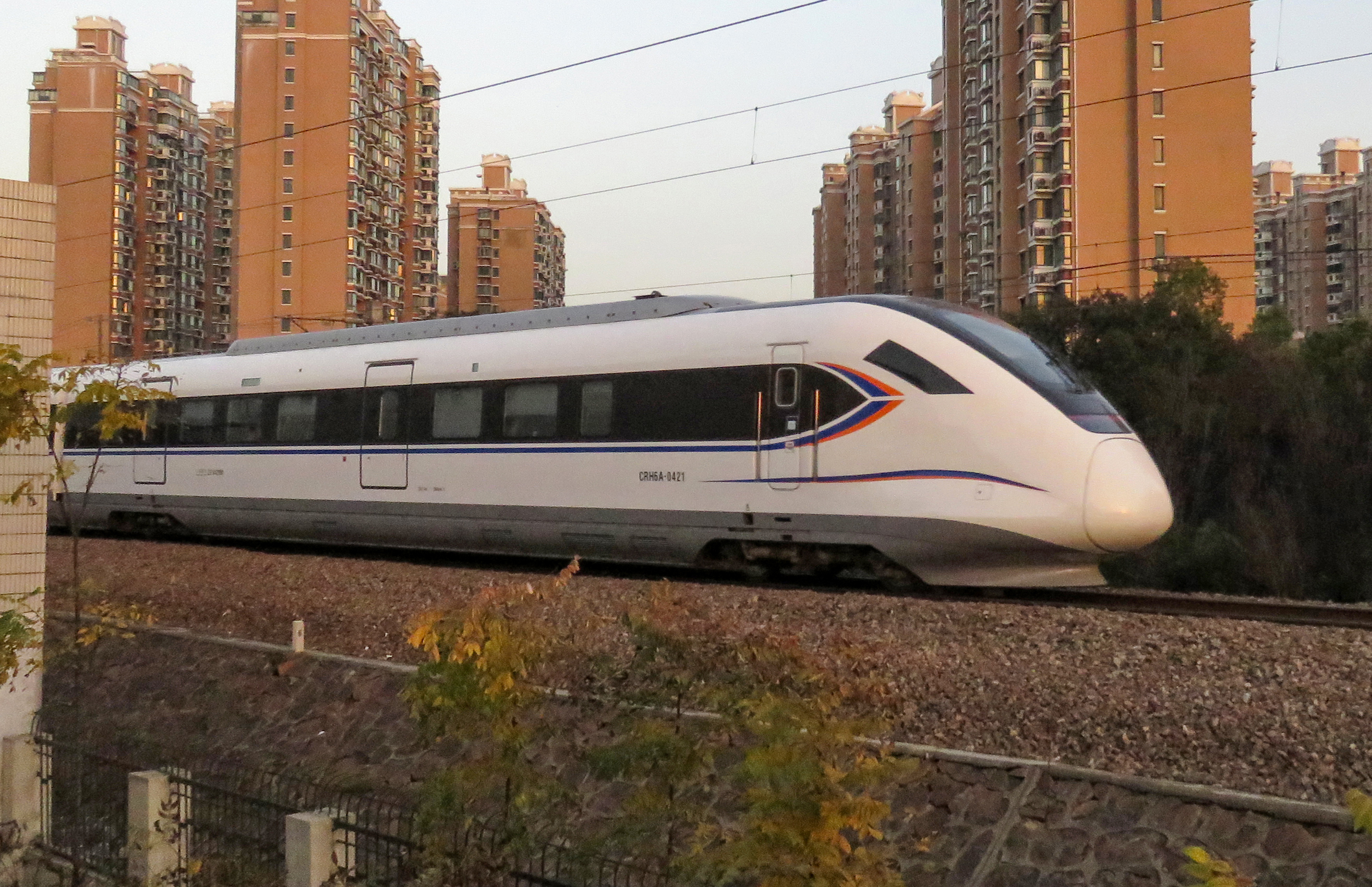
- A CRH6A train on Jinshan Railway service, seen on nearby Lianhua Road Station

Overview
- Other name: Line 22 (planned name)
- Status: Operational
- Locale: Xuhui, Minhang, Songjiang, and Jinshan districts Shanghai
- Termini: Shanghai South; Jinshanwei
- Connecting lines: 1 3 5 15 T1
- Stations: 8 (excluding Xinzhuang)

Service
- Type: Heavy rail/Higher-speed rail/Commuter rail
- System: Shanghai Suburban Railway
- Services: Express, Holiday, and Local
- Operator: China Railway Shanghai Group
- Depot: Shanghai South EMU
- Rolling stock: CRH2A, CRH6A, and CRH6F 8 car trains

History
- Opened: 1975; 51 years ago (original line); September 28, 2012; 14 years ago (high-speed commuter rail)

Technical
- Line length: 56.4 km (35.0 mi)
- Num of tracks: 2
- Character: At grade
- Track gauge: 1,435 mm (4 ft 8 1/2 in)
- Electrification: Overhead lines (AC 25 kV)
- Operating speed: 160 km/h (100 mph)
Route map
Geographic map
Part of a series on
Transport in Shanghai
- Roads
- Long Distance Rail
- Commuter Rail
- Maglev
- Metro
- Tram
- Trolleybus
- Bus
- Ferry
Long Distance
- Airports
  - SHA
  - PVG
- HSR
  - Huning
  - Jinghu
  - Coastal
  - Yangtze
  - Hukun
  - HuSuHu
  - HuSuTong
- Conventional Rail
  - Jinghu
  - Hukun
- Railway stations
  - Shanghai
  - Hongqiao
  - Shanghainan
  - Shanghaixi
  - Songjiang
Shanghai Suburban Railway
- Jinshan railway
- Airport Link line
Shanghai Metro
- 1 2 3 4 5 6 7 8 9 10 11 12
13 14 15 16 17 18 Pujiang
- Miscellanea
  - Trains
  - Stations
  - Timeline
Trams in Shanghai
- 1908-75
- Zhangjiang (Closed)
- Songjiang (T1
- T2)
Roads
- Municipal express roads
- Provincial expressways
- National expressways
- Yangtze River fixed crossing
Shanghai Public Transport Card

The Jinshan Railway (Chinese: 金山铁路; pinyin: Jīnshān Tiělù) or Jinshan Line is a commuter rail line in Shanghai, part of the Shanghai Suburban Railway. It runs from Shanghai South in Xuhui District via Xinzhuang in Minhang District to Jinshanwei in Jinshan District, crossing the Huangpu River on a dedicated railway bridge. Passengers can transfer to Lines 1, 3, 5 and 15. Originally built in 1975 as a suburban branch, it has since been upgraded into a high-speed commuter rail line which opened on 28 September 2012. The line was branded as Line 22 before opening. However, there is another Line 22 in early planning.

It is the first line to provide "high speed" commuter rail services, with trains travelling up to 160 km/h (100 mph), compared to 80–100 km/h (50–60 mph) for regular metro service, shortening the 56.4 km (35.0 mi) between Jinshan and downtown to 32 minutes travel time for non-stop express trains, and 60 minutes for other trains,. The Shanghai-Jinshan line is the first local rail system that supports the public transportation card.

Initially daily passenger flow only just 13,000; this had increased to 33,000 per day by 2019. The total ridership for the first seven years of the line’s operation was over 60 million.

== Operation ==
=== Stations ===
Jinshan service
| R - express trains (S10xx); H - semi-express weekend trains (S12xx); L - local trains (S16xx) | | | | | | ● - all trains stop; △ - partial service; ｜ - non-stop; X - no service (closed) | | | |
| Routes | | | Station name | | | Connections | Distance km | | Location District |
| R | H | L | Code | English | Chinese | Connections | Distance km | | Location District |
| ● | ● | ● | SNH | Shanghai South | 上海南 | 1 3 15 Shanghai South Railway Station | 0 | 0 | Xuhui |
| ｜ | ｜ | △ | XZH | Xinzhuang | ~~莘庄~~ | 1 5 Xinzhuang | 6 | 6 | Minhang |
| ｜ | ｜ | ● | CWH | Chunshen | 春申 | | 4 | 10 | Songjiang |
| ｜ | △ | ● | XQH | Xinqiao | 新桥 | T1 | 5 | 15 | Songjiang |
| ｜ | △ | ● | MIH | Chedun | 车墩 | | 7 | 22 | Songjiang |
| ｜ | ｜ | ● | YOH | Yexie | 叶榭 | | 8 | 30 | Songjiang |
| ｜ | ● | ● | TVH | Tinglin | 亭林 | | 6 | 36 | Jinshan |
| ｜ | ｜ | ● | REH | Jinshan Industrial Park | 金山园区 | through operations on Pudong Railway to Luchaogang suspended | 7 | 43 | Jinshan |
| X | X | X | SPH | Sanyang | 山阳 | | | | Jinshan |
| ● | ● | ● | BGH | Jinshanwei | 金山卫 | | 12 | 55 | Jinshan |
| X | X | X | JDH | Jinshanwei East | 金卫东 | | | | Jinshan |

- Weekend service schedule is different from regular service and is provided on weekends and national holidays.

=== Future expansion ===
==== Extension to Shanghai Hongqiao ====
In February 2021, it was stated that a project to increase the capacity of the line would start before the end of the year, and the possibility of services running to Shanghai Hongqiao railway station was being explored.

==== Extension from Shanghai South Railway station ====
A branch line to Sanlin South on the Airport Link line is in the planning. Another branch line to Shanghai Stadium has been planned.

==== Southern extension: Jinshan-Pinghu City Railway ====
There are also plans to extend the line west to Haiyan County via Pinghu. The Jinshan-Pinghu municipal railway is a commuter-oriented, public-transit railway that uses national trunk lines, national-Shanghai joint-venture railway trunks, and municipal railways to share resources. It plans to maintain the technical standards, transportation organization, and operation management model of Jinshan Railway. The construction length of the line is 50.51 kilometres (31.39 mi), including 9.7 kilometres (6.0 mi) in Jinshan section, 24.32 kilometres (15.11 mi) in Pinghu section, 4.7 kilometres (2.9 mi) in Jiaxing Port section, and 11.79 kilometres (7.33 mi) in Haiyan section. The total investment of the project is estimated to be about 17.089 billion yuan. There are eight stations, including one interchange station at Jinshanwei, six new stations (Dushan Port East, Dushan Port West, Zhapu, Pinghu, Haiyan Development Zone, Haiyan East), one future station in Lindai. Average station spacing is 8.4 km (5.2 mi), and the design speed is 160 km/h (100 mph). Including the renovation project of Jinshanwei railway station, and one EMU.

It was expected that the project would be completed between the end of 2023 to the first half of 2024. After the expansion project is completed, Jinshan Railway will expand from the existing 37 pairs to about 60 pairs, which can be further enlarged according to demand.

== Fares ==
Ticket prices range from 3 to 10 yuan. Passengers can swipe the Shanghai transportation card or use the QR code to pass through the ticket gates. Additionally, blue magnetic single-ride paper tickets can be purchased at dedicated Jinshan Railway vending machines using WeChat Pay or Alipay. Passengers do not need ID to buy tickets for this line.

== Technology ==
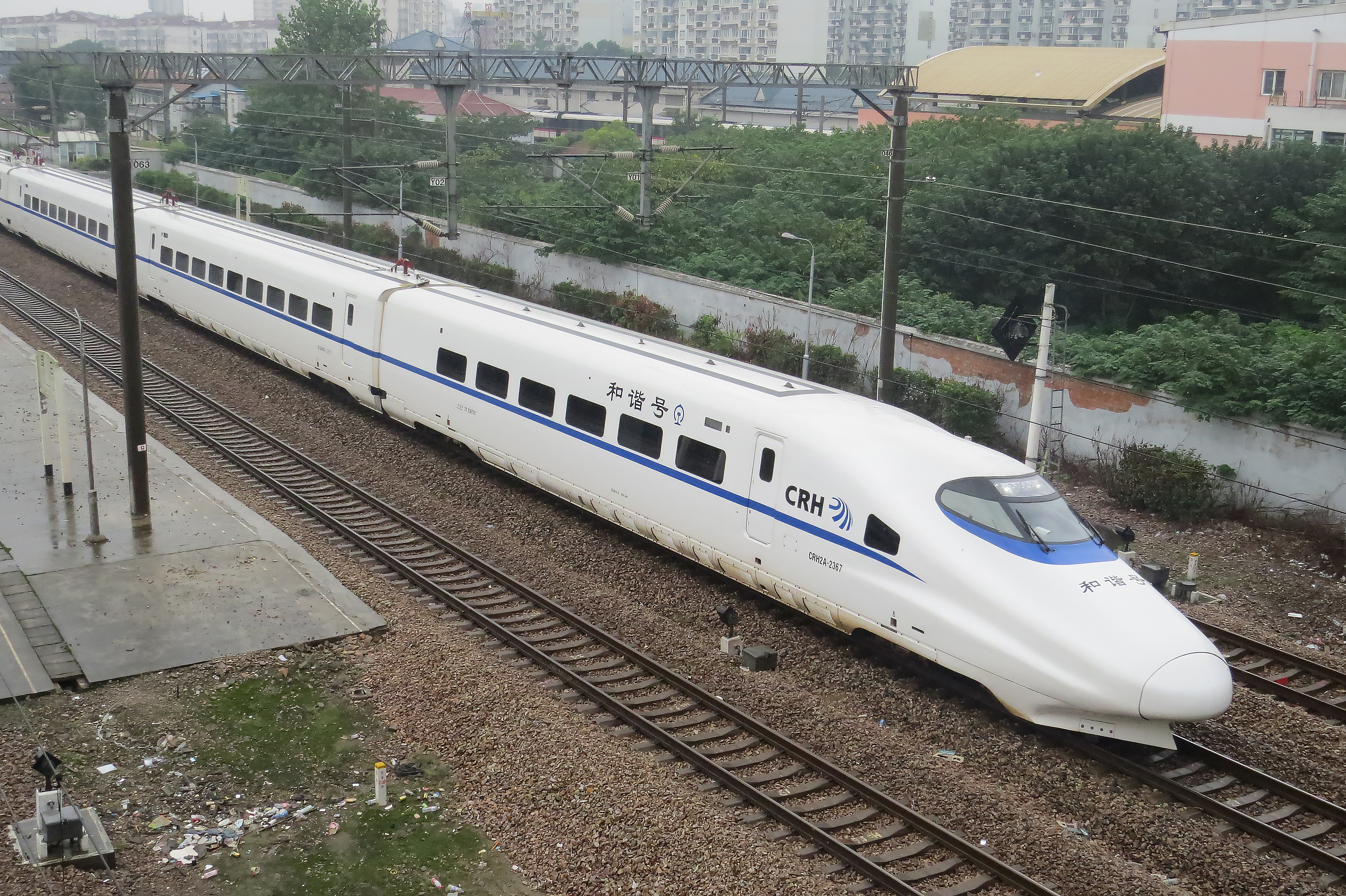
A CRH2A trainset running from Jinshanwei

=== Rolling Stock ===
Jinshan Railway passenger trains include:

- 3 × CRH2A EMU trains (are also used on other long-distance lines)
- 2 × CRH6A EMU trains (dedicated trains for Jinshan)
- 4 × CRH6F EMU trains (dedicated trains for Jinshan); trains with a larger passenger capacity of 1,950. Started operating from 13 December 2019. The previous model could only carry approximately 600 passengers.

== See also ==
- Shanghai Rail Transit
