= Pudong railway =

Freight railway line in Shanghai, China

Pudong Railway

Chinese name
- Simplified Chinese: 浦东铁路
- Traditional Chinese: 浦東鐵路
Transcriptions
Standard Mandarin
- Hanyu Pinyin: Pǔdōng Tiělù
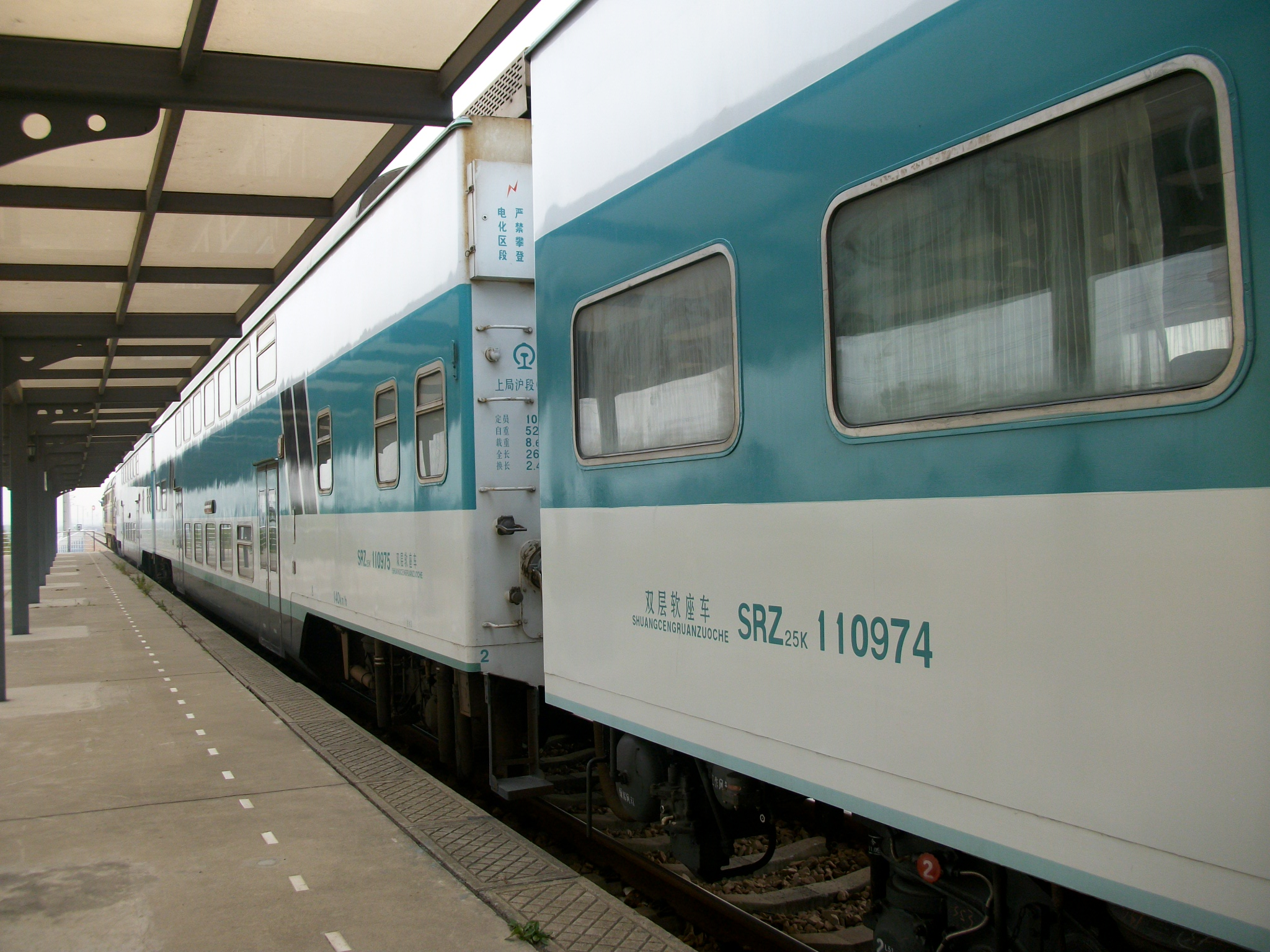
- Train at Haiwan railway station on the Pudong railway

Overview
- Status: Operational (freight only)
- Locale: Jinshan, Fengxian, Pudong; Shanghai
- Termini: Jinshan Industrial Park; Luchaogang
- Stations: 5

Service
- Type: Freight rail
- Services: 1
- Operator(s): China Railway Shanghai Group; Shanghai Pudong Railway Development Co., Ltd. Shanghai Railway Container Central Station Development Co., Ltd.

History
- Commenced: November 2004; 21 years ago
- Opened: December 9, 2005; 20 years ago (freight service); September 1, 2008; 17 years ago (passenger service)
- Closed: August 27, 2015; 10 years ago (passenger service)

Technical
- Line length: 42.87 km (26.64 mi)
- Number of tracks: 1
- Track gauge: 1,435 mm (4 ft 8 1/2 in)
- Electrification: No
- Operating speed: 120 km/h (74.56 mph)
Route map
Part of a series on
Transport in Shanghai
- Roads
- Long Distance Rail
- Commuter Rail
- Maglev
- Metro
- Tram
- Trolleybus
- Bus
- Ferry
Long Distance
- Airports
  - SHA
  - PVG
- HSR
  - Huning
  - Jinghu
  - Coastal
  - Yangtze
  - Hukun
  - HuSuHu
  - HuSuTong
- Conventional Rail
  - Jinghu
  - Hukun
- Railway stations
  - Shanghai
  - Hongqiao
  - Shanghainan
  - Shanghaixi
  - Songjiang
Shanghai Suburban Railway
- Jinshan railway
- Airport Link line
Shanghai Metro
- 1 2 3 4 5 6 7 8 9 10 11 12
13 14 15 16 17 18 Pujiang
- Miscellanea
  - Trains
  - Stations
  - Timeline
Trams in Shanghai
- 1908-75
- Zhangjiang (Closed)
- Songjiang (T1
- T2)
Roads
- Municipal express roads
- Provincial expressways
- National expressways
- Yangtze River fixed crossing
Shanghai Public Transport Card

The Pudong railway (simplified Chinese: 浦东铁路; traditional Chinese: 浦東鐵路; pinyin: Pǔdōng Tiělù) is a railway line operated by China Railway. Located entirely in Shanghai, China, the 42.87-kilometre-long (26.64 mi) railway line is used solely for freight services, although passenger services did operate along the line until 2015. At its western terminus, it branches off from the Jinshan railway at Jinshan Industrial Park in the city's Jinshan District and runs eastward to Luchaogang in Pudong, with three intermediate stations.

Construction of the railway line was completed on 9 December 2005. Passenger service on the line started on 1 September 2008, with trains travelling between Shanghai South and Luchaogang, with an intermediate stop at Haiwan. These trains would use the Jinshan railway between Shanghai South and Jinshan Industrial Park, before switching to the Pudong railway and travelling the entire length of the line.

Passenger service on the line was suspended on 27 August 2015, due to the presence of a hazardous chemicals storage yard near Luchaogang station. This safety measure was taken in response to the 2015 Tianjin explosions.

== History ==
- It was the first suburban line in Shanghai.
- The investment for the line was 1.951 billion yuan.
- The first phase of Pudong Railway was completed on 9 December 2005.
- Passenger trains 5051-5052 and 5053/5054 officially opened on 1 September 2008.
- The passenger train was renamed K8351/8352, K8353/8354 times on 1 April 2009.
- Passenger trains increased two-way stops at Haiwan Station on 15 September.
- The number of individual passengers per train is roughly 50; about 200 people per day (4 trains) which led to a daily occupancy rate of only 35%.
- Passenger trains suspended on 27 August 2015.

== Stations ==
At the time when it was operating, it took 1 hour and 10 minutes for a train trip between Luchaogang Station and Shanghai South Railway Station, and the fare was 17 yuan.

=== Service routes ===
Pudong railway service routes
Currently no passenger services run on the Pudong railway; September 1, 2008 - April 1, 2009: 5051/5052, 5053/5054 passenger trains; April 1, 2009 - August 27, 2015: K8351/8352, K8353/8354 passenger trains
| Routes | Station name | | | Connections | Distance km | | Location |
| | № | English | Chinese | Connections | Distance km | | Location |
| | UCH | Luchaogang | 芦潮港 | | 0 | 0 | Pudong |
| | STH | Situan | 四团 | | 10 | 10 | Fengxian |
| | RWH | Haiwan | 海湾 | | 20 | 30 | Fengxian |
| | CPH | Caojing | 漕泾 | | 15 | 45 | Jinshan |
| | REH | Jinshan Yuanqu (Jinshan Industry Park) | 金山园区 | Through operations on Jinshan to SNH | 6 | 51 | Jinshan |

=== Station name change ===
- On September 28, 2012, Ruanxiang railway station was renamed Jinshan Yuanqu railway station.

== Technology ==
=== Rolling stock ===
There were eight China Railway 25Z passenger cars (body marked 25K) on the bottom of the double-decker passenger train, all of which are soft seats. The K8351/8352 and K8353/8354 trains use a set of bottoms, using 4 square Bombardier RZ25T plus a KD25G / KD25K generator car.
