= Donglin Temple =

Donglin Temple (Chinese: 东林寺; pinyin: Dōnglín Sì; lit. 'East Wood Temple') is a name used for several temples in China:

- Donglin Temple (Jiujiang)
- Donglin Temple (Shanghai)
