= Yexie railway station =

Railway station in Shanghai, China

Yexie 叶榭
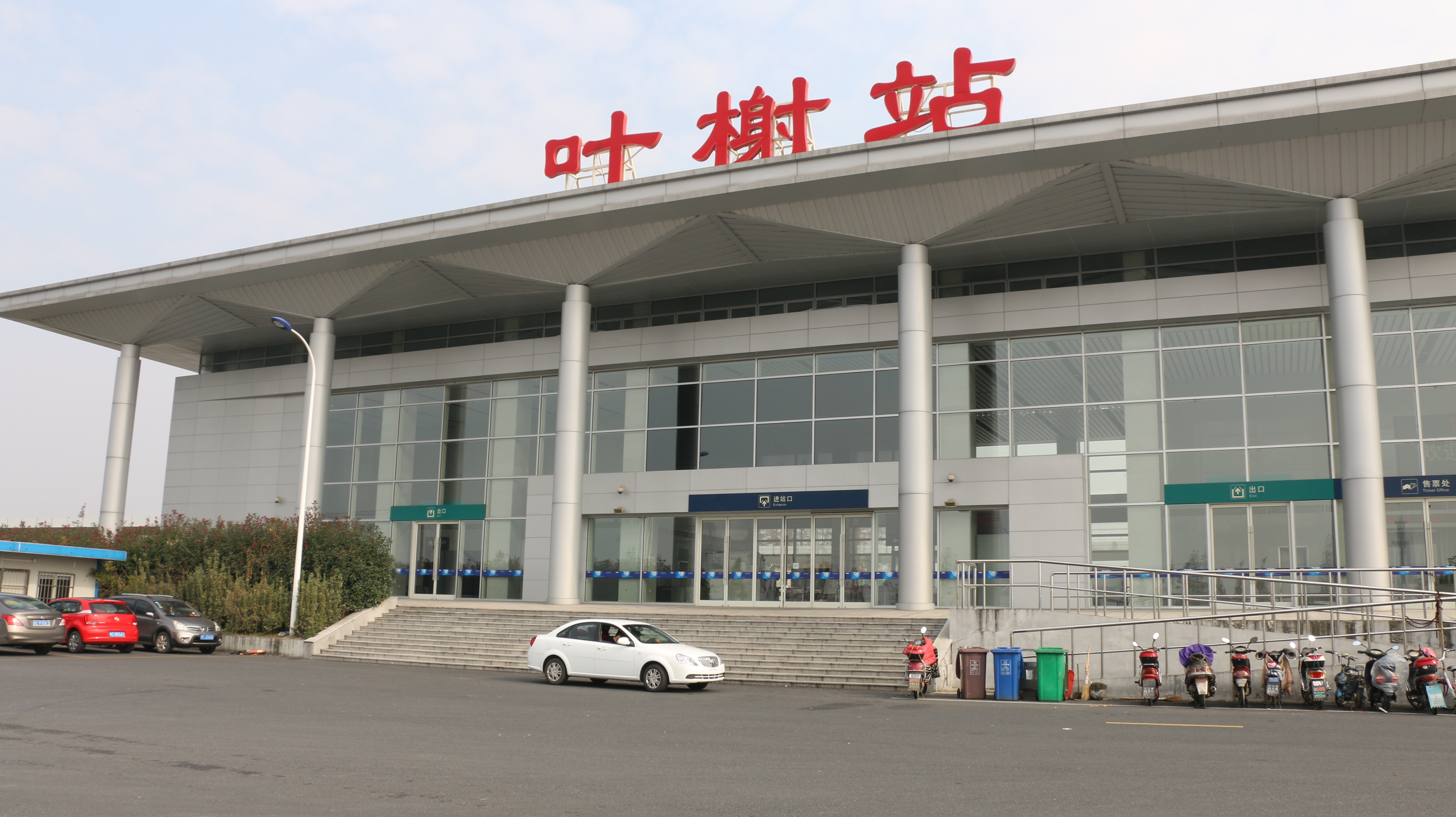
- Station exterior

General information
- Location: Songjiang District, Shanghai; China
- Coordinates: 30°56′32″N 121°19′30″E
- Line: Jinshan Railway

History
- Opened: September 28, 2012

Services
Preceding station	China Railway	Following station
Chedun towards Shanghai South	Jinshan railway	Tinglin towards Jinshanwei
Location
- Location within Shanghai

Yexie (simplified Chinese: 叶榭; traditional Chinese: 葉榭; pinyin: Yèxiè) is a railway station on the Jinshan railway in Songjiang District, Shanghai. It opened for intercity passenger service on September 28, 2012.
