= Shanyang, Shanghai =

Shanyang 山阳镇
- Towns
- Location in Shanghai
- Coordinates: 30°45′48″N 121°21′7″E
- Country: People's Republic of China
- Municipality: Shanghai
- District: Jinshan

Area
  - Total: 42.12 km^{2} (16.26 sq mi)

Population (2010)
  - Total: 84,640
  - Density: 2,009/km^{2} (5,205/sq mi)
- Time zone: UTC+8 (China Standard)

Shanyang is a town in Jinshan District, Shanghai.
