= Donglin =

Donglin may refer to:

- Donglin Academy, academy established in the Northern Song dynasty at present-day Wuxi in China
- Donglin movement, ideological and philosophical movement of the late Ming and early Qing dynasties of China
- Donglin Temple, Buddhist monastery in Jiujiang, Jiangxi, China
- Donglin Temple, Buddhist temple in Jinshan District, Shanghai, China
