= Jinshan Yuanqu railway station =

Railway station in Shanghai, China

Coordinates: 30°49′47″N 121°22′04″E

Jinshan Yuanqu (Jinshan Industrial Park) 金山园区
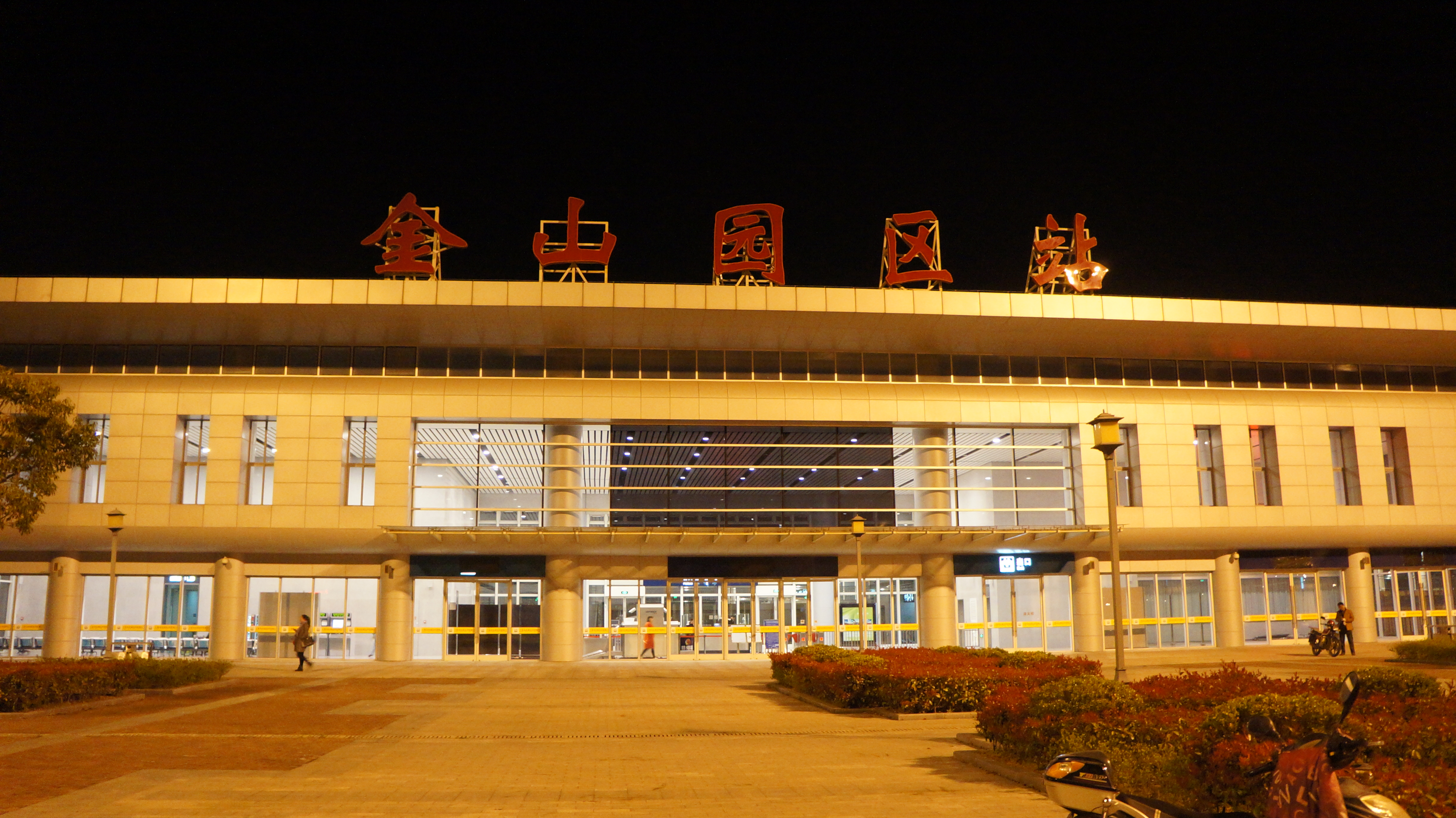
- Station exterior at night

General information
- Location: Jinshan District, Shanghai; China
- Lines: Jinshan Railway; Pudong railway

History
- Opened: December 9, 2005
- Former names: Ruanxiang Railway Station

Services
| Preceding station | China Railway | Following station |
|---|---|---|
| Tinglin towards Shanghai South | Jinshan railway | Jinshanwei Terminus |
| Terminus | Pudong railway | Caojing towards Luchaogang |
Location
- Location within Shanghai

Jinshan Yuanqu (simplified Chinese: 金山园区; traditional Chinese: 金山園區; pinyin: Jīnshān Yuánqū; lit. 'Jinshan Industrial Park') is a railway station on the Jinshan railway in Jinshan District, Shanghai. It opened as a divergence to the newly-built Pudong Railway on December 9, 2005 as Ruanxiang Railway Station. In 2012 it was renamed to Jinshan Yuanqu and started intercity passenger service on September 28, 2012. The station serves Shanghai Jinshan Industrial Park. Only local trains stop at this station.
