= Luchaogang Station =

Railway Station in Shanghai, China

Luchaogang Railway Station 芦潮港站
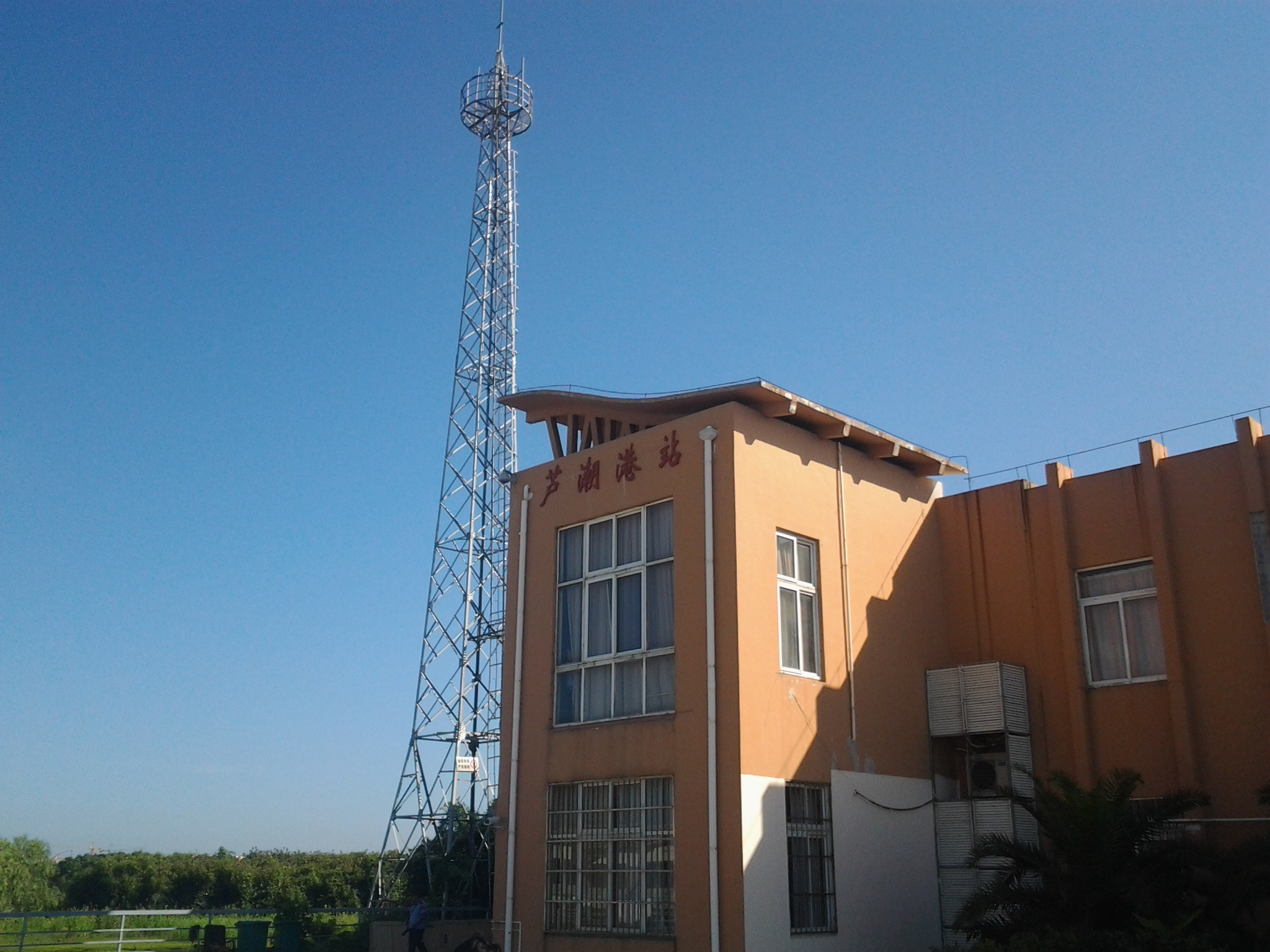
- Luchaogang Station Building，July 2014

General information
- Location: Luchaogang, Pudong New District, Shanghai; China
- Coordinates: 30.8897°N 121.85637°E
- System: Fourth class intermediate station (四等中间站).
- Owner: China Railway
- Operator: CR Shanghai
- Line: Pudong Railway

Construction
- Structure type: At grade

Other information
- Station code: 32348 (TMIS code); UCH (telegraph code); LCG (Pinyin code)

History
- Opened: 2005
Location

Luchaogang Station, also known as the Luchaogang Central Station, is a freight station and a former passenger station on the Pudong Railway (which ceased passenger service on August 27, 2015), and the terminus of the first phase of the Pudong Railway. It is located in the community of Luchaogang Town, Nanhui New City, Pudong New District, Shanghai, People's Republic of China, 32 km away from the Yangshan Deepwater Port, 37 km away from Shanghai Pudong International Airport, and 80 km from Hongqiao International Airport. The station started operation on December 1, 2005, and is the first dedicated railroad container terminal of the PRC. It is within the Bonded Port Supervision Area of Yangshan Customs. The station is a first-class Port of Entry since 2009.

== Operations ==
Luchaogang Station had 2 pairs of passenger trains (K8351/8352, K8353/8354) to/from Shanghai South Railway Station every day before it stopped passenger service. These two trains also called at Haiwan Station, which does not currently operate passenger services either. Due to its main role as a freight center for Yangshan port, and the close proximity to very large hazardous materials warehouses, the passenger service was suspended since 27 August 2015.

Luchaogang Station has scheduled container freight train liners from Shanghai to many destinations in China, including places in its hinterland like Hefei, Nanchang, Suzhou, etc. The serious shortage of freight capacity by China Railway, has resulted in a mere 0.4% of the containers passing Yangshan Deepwater Port being transported by rail. The station is one of the terminals of the Trans-Eurasia Logistics network, meaning it can dispatch boxes all the way to destinations in Europe.

== Public transit ==
Surrounding public transit routes include the Nanlin special line, the Shengang No 3 route, the Xinling special line, the Luchaogang No 1 route, and the Pudong Road No 29 route.

== See also ==
- Pudong Railway
- Jinshan Yuanqu station
- Situan station
- Caojing station
- Haiwan Station
