= Shanghai Pudong Airport APM =

Rapid transit system in Pudong International Airport, China

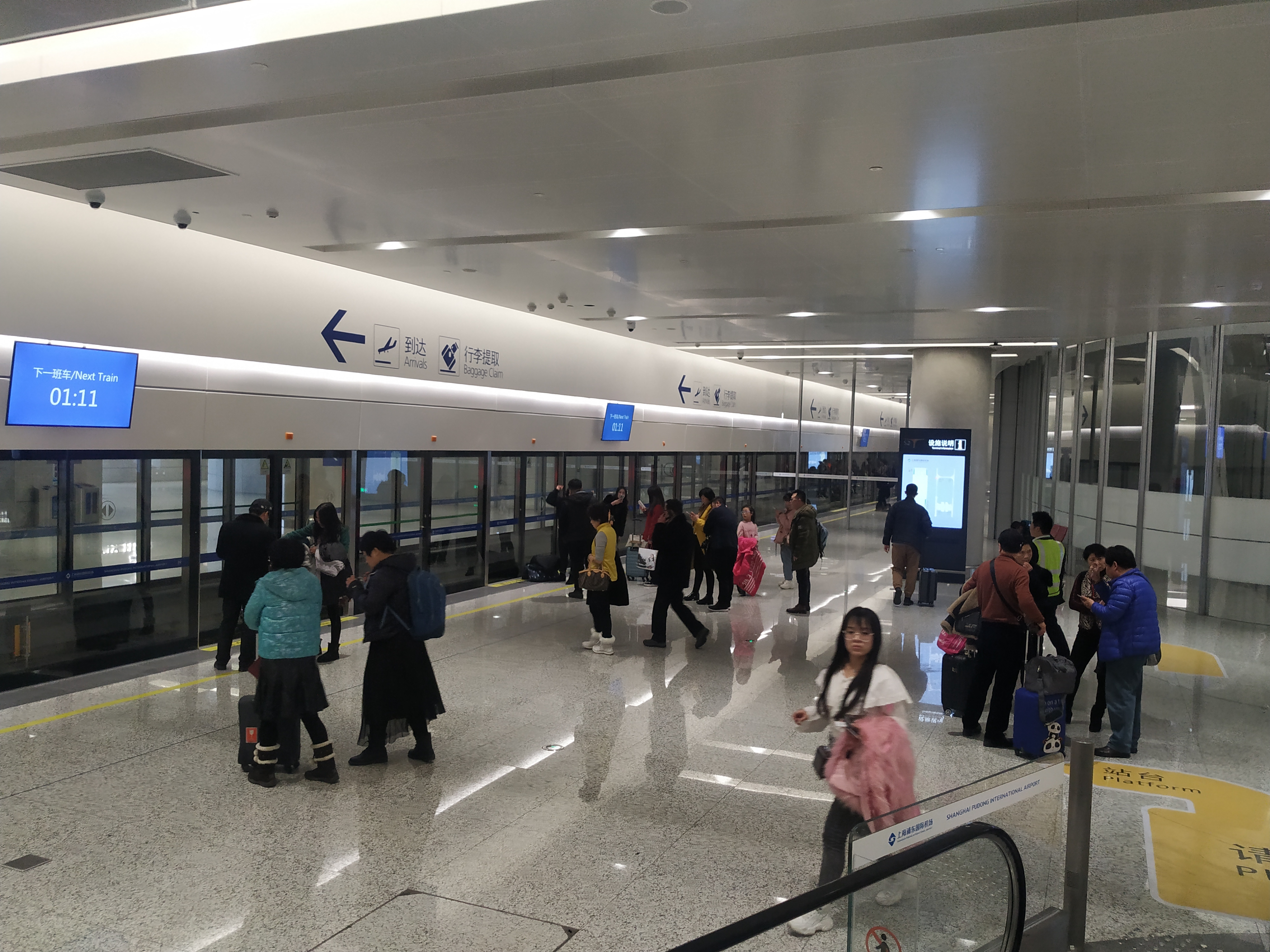
- Station of Shanghai Pudong Airport APM

Overview
- Status: Operational
- Owner: Shanghai Airport Authority
- Locale: Pudong District, Shanghai
- Termini: West line: T1; East line: T2; West line: S1; East line: S2
- Stations: 4

Service
- Type: Rapid transit, automated people mover
- System: Shanghai Pudong Airport APM
- Services: West line: T1-S1; East line: T2-S2
- Operator(s): Shanghai Keolis (a joint-venture of Shanghai Shentong Metro Group (51%) and Keolis (49%))
- Depot(s): Pudong Airport Yard
- Rolling stock: JY01A01
- Daily ridership: 100,000 (daily average); 250,000 (forecast)

History
- Opened: 16 September 2019; 6 years ago

Technical
- Line length: 7.8 km (4.8 mi) (total); East line: 1.652 km (1.0 mi); West line: 1.861 km (1.2 mi)
- Character: Underground
- Track gauge: 1,435 mm (4 ft 8 1/2 in)
- Electrification: 1,500 V DC third rail (main line) or OHLE (depot)
- Operating speed: 80 km/h (50 mph)
- Signalling: FITSCO GoA3 / DTO
Route map
Route map of PVG Airport APM:
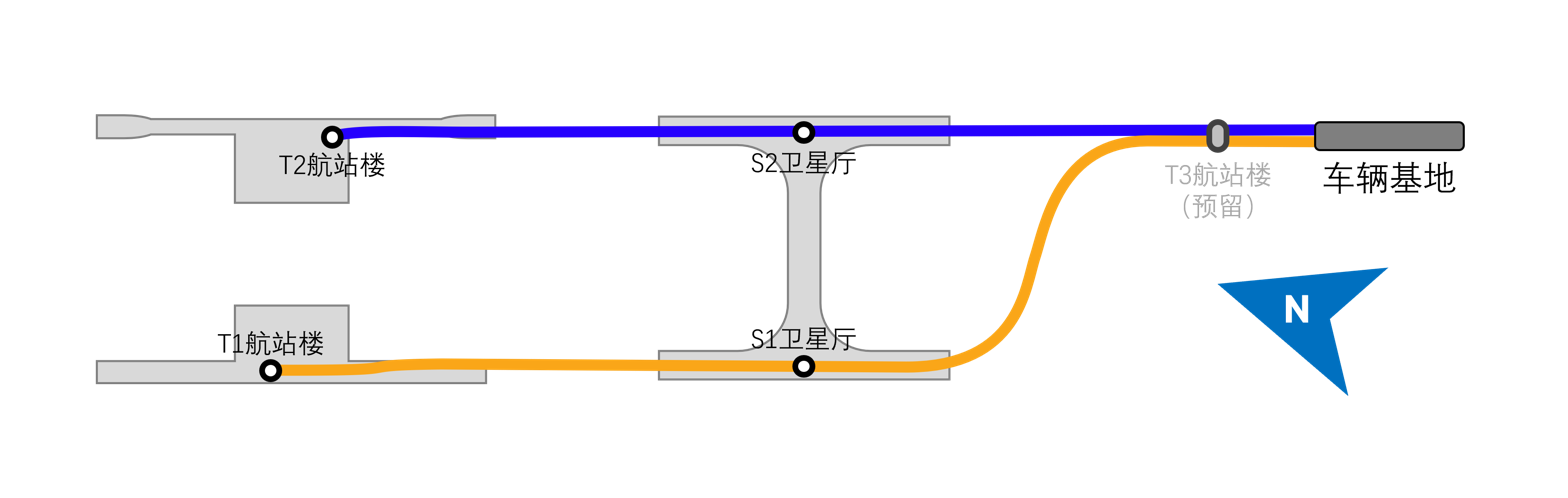

Shanghai Pudong Airport APM is an automated people mover in the Pudong International Airport. In the initial phase, there are two lines, each connecting a terminal building and a satellite hall. The two lines are planned to be connected after the completion of Terminal 3 in the future. The system uses Class A stocks, currently in a 4-car configuration, with conditions reserved for a 5-car configuration across the fleet.

== Route ==
The east line of the APM starts from Terminal 2 to S2 Satellite Hall, and extends to the T3 terminal station in the long term. They are all platforms on one island side on the first basement level. The main line is 2.16 kilometres (1.34 mi) long (the operating section is 1,652 metres (5,420 ft) long). The west link (S2-vehicle base) is 2 kilometres (1.2 mi).

The APM West Line starts from Terminal 1 to S1 Satellite Hall, and extends to the T3 terminal station in the long-term. They are all platforms on the one-island side of the basement level. The main line is 2.37 kilometres (1.47 mi) long (the operating section is 1,861 metres (6,106 ft) long) to the east. The tie line (S1-T3) is 713.22 metres (2,340 ft 0 in).

Both S1 and S2 are connected together and are since the opening in September 2019 connected by a 7.8 km (4.8 mi) underground automated people mover to the current T1 and T2 terminals operated by Shanghai Keolis for 20 years, including the East Line and the West Line.

== Technology ==
It is equipped with CBTC technology, which enables operations at higher frequencies and speeds safely - with or without a driver. In the case of the Pudong airport line, this metro will have a driver on-board (Grade of Operation 2). The service headway at peak hours will be 4 to 5 minutes and 10 minutes during off-peak hours.

FITSCO signaling realizes the functions of stable arrival, precise alignment, parking, unattended automatic return, automatic shuttle mode and unattended automatic storage in the main line under ATO control. The train is sent to the storage area to sleep in an unmanned and fully automated way, it is woken up remotely on ATS, runs the pre-departure test, and automatically enters the service platform to reduce the operation intensity and meet the requirements of airport security management.

== Rolling stock ==
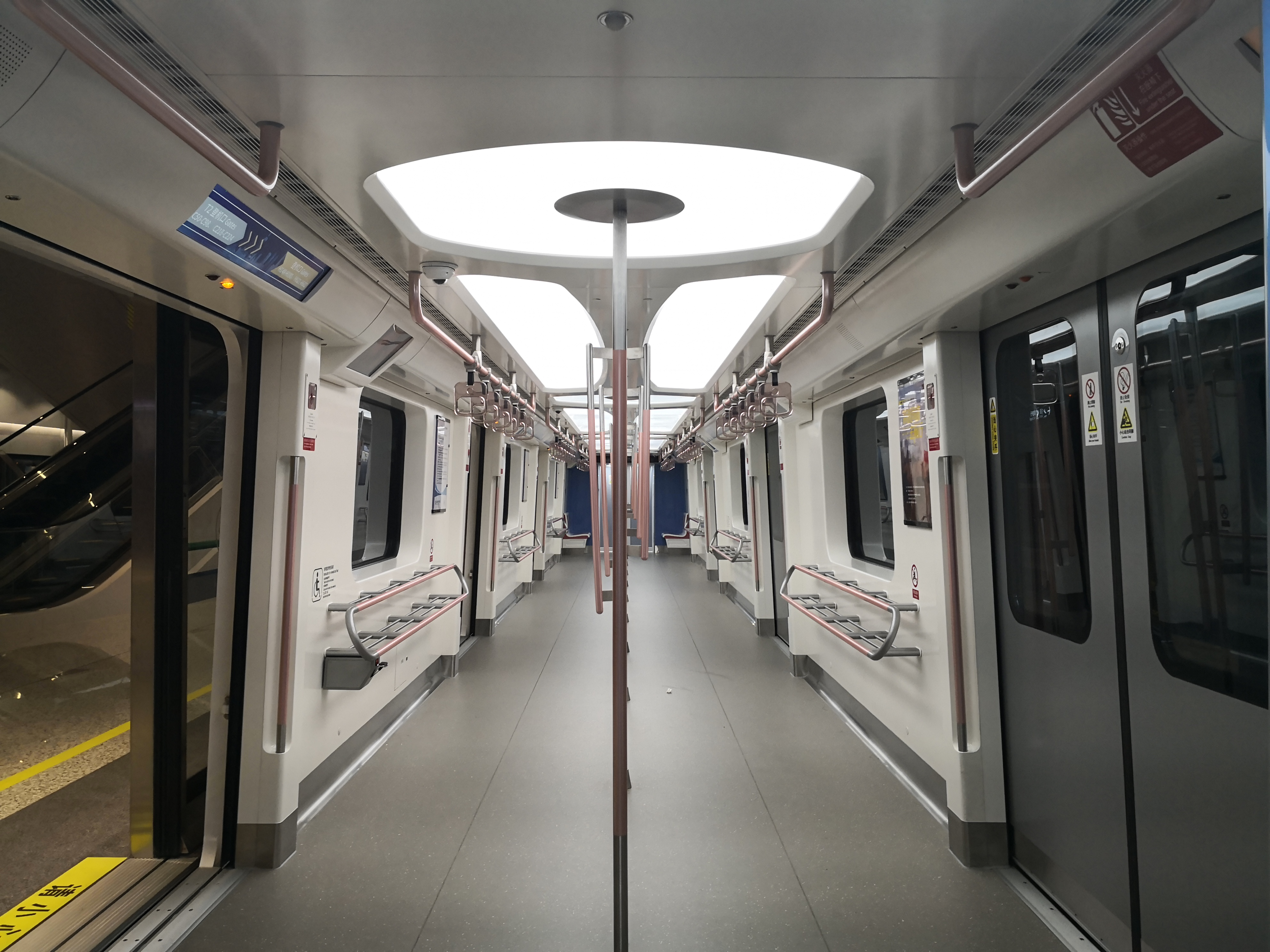
Interiors of the Airport APM

The Pudong Airport APM uses JY01A01 trains of Class A size with a maximum speed of 80 kilometres per hour (50 mph). The main line supplies power to the third rail, and in the depot power is supplied using overhead wires. JY01A01s are built by CRRC Changchun Railway Vehicles, the each 4-cars unit are 94 metres (308 ft) long and can carry 800 passengers, two for domestic flight passengers and the rest for international flight passengers. There are isolation doors between the carriages to separate the two types of passengers, and the platforms of both the terminal and satellite building stations are also split by physical barriers. Boarding pass checks are routinely carried out at the terminal's platform for passengers going to the satellite hall to take international flights - passengers must present their boarding pass with the initial "G" at the boarding gate before they can board. No checks take place in the domestic sections; passengers can freely take the train to the satellite building and back to the terminal.

Screens for flight information and luggage racks have been installed. It is designed to transport 9,000 passengers per hour during peak periods with an interval of about two minutes. A ride between a terminal and its satellite takes 2.5 minutes. It adopts double-line shuttle operation mode.
