= Dongling Group =

Chinese industrial conglomerate

Dongling Group 东岭集团
- Native name: 东岭集团
- Type: Privately held
- Industry: Mining, metallurgy, coking, real estate, logistics
- Founded: 1979
- Headquarters: Baoji, Shaanxi, China
- Products: Steel, zinc, coal, non-ferrous metals
- Revenue: ¥132.77 billion (2021)
- Number of employees: Over 18,000
- Website: en.chinadljt.com

Dongling Group (Chinese: 东岭集团) is a Chinese industrial conglomerate headquartered in Baoji, Shaanxi. The company is active in the mining, metallurgy, coking, energy, logistics, and real estate sectors. As of 2021, it reported annual revenues of ¥132.77 billion, making it one of China's largest private enterprises by revenue.

== History and Operations ==
Founded in 1979 as a village collective enterprise, Dongling Group developed into Western China's largest zinc producer and one of the country’s major steel traders. Its core business areas included:

- Metal Smelting: Dongling was the largest zinc manufacturer in Western China, with operations in non-ferrous metallurgy.
- Mining and Mineral Energy: The group operated coal mines and coking facilities.
- Supply Chain Services: Dongling managed integrated logistics and warehousing systems for industrial materials.
- Real Estate: The company invested in commercial and residential projects, including the Dongling Xishang tower in Wuxi.
- Finance and Investment: It also had interests in regional financial services and insurance.

At its peak, Dongling operated more than 100 subsidiaries across over 40 cities in China.

== Bankruptcy and Restructuring ==
In July 2024, Dongling Group filed for bankruptcy due to financial distress stemming from falling steel prices, weak demand for construction rebar, and exposure to China’s ailing real estate sector. The Baoji Intermediate People's Court accepted a creditor petition filed by Shaanxi Libang Software Co., Ltd. and appointed Beijing Guantao (Xi’an) Law Firm as bankruptcy administrator.

As of August 2024, the group faced 145 legal claims and had court-enforced debts of over ¥1.27 billion. Creditors were instructed to submit claims by September 27, 2024.
