= Dongling Vibration =

Vibration test equipment manufacture company

- Industry: manufacturing
- Founded: 1995
- Headquarters: Suzhou, P.R China
- Products: vibration test equipment
- Number of employees: 250+

Dongling Vibration (Chinese: 东菱振动; pinyin: Dōnglíng Zhèndòng) is a top-level vibration test equipment manufacture company. Founded in 1995 in Suzhou, P.R China, it has over 250 employees, most of whom work in its headquarters in Suzhou, P.R. China, which is called Dongling Science and Technology Park.

At the moment, Dongling Vibration holds stakes in several subsidiaries: Siliyo, which specializes in shock and bump test tools; ATW Dongling, a joint venture of Dongling and ATW, in auto engine and transmission cold test equipment; Hangzhou Inter-Measure, who builds Amber, an electrodynamic shaker controller; Lingyun, a large electro-hydraulic servo simulation test system provider; and Changling Test Service Center, who provides environmental tests service to customers.

In 2005, Donging received government's award for its role in testing Shenzhou 6. In 2006, Dongling made the supposedly largest electrodynamic shaker in the world.
