= Jinshan, Shanghai =

Coordinates: 30°49′52″N 121°20′38″E

Jinshan 金山区; 金山區 Kinshan
- District
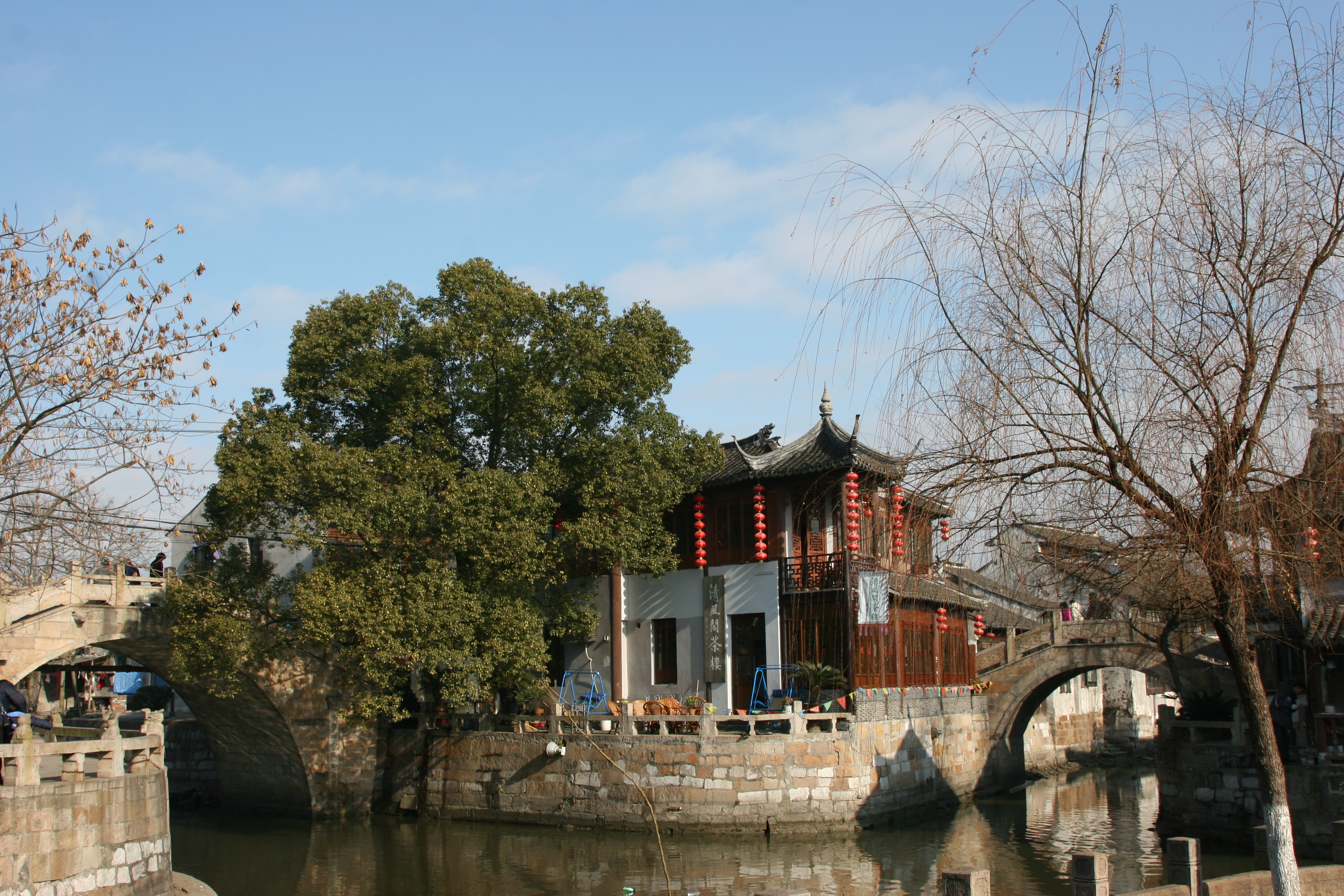
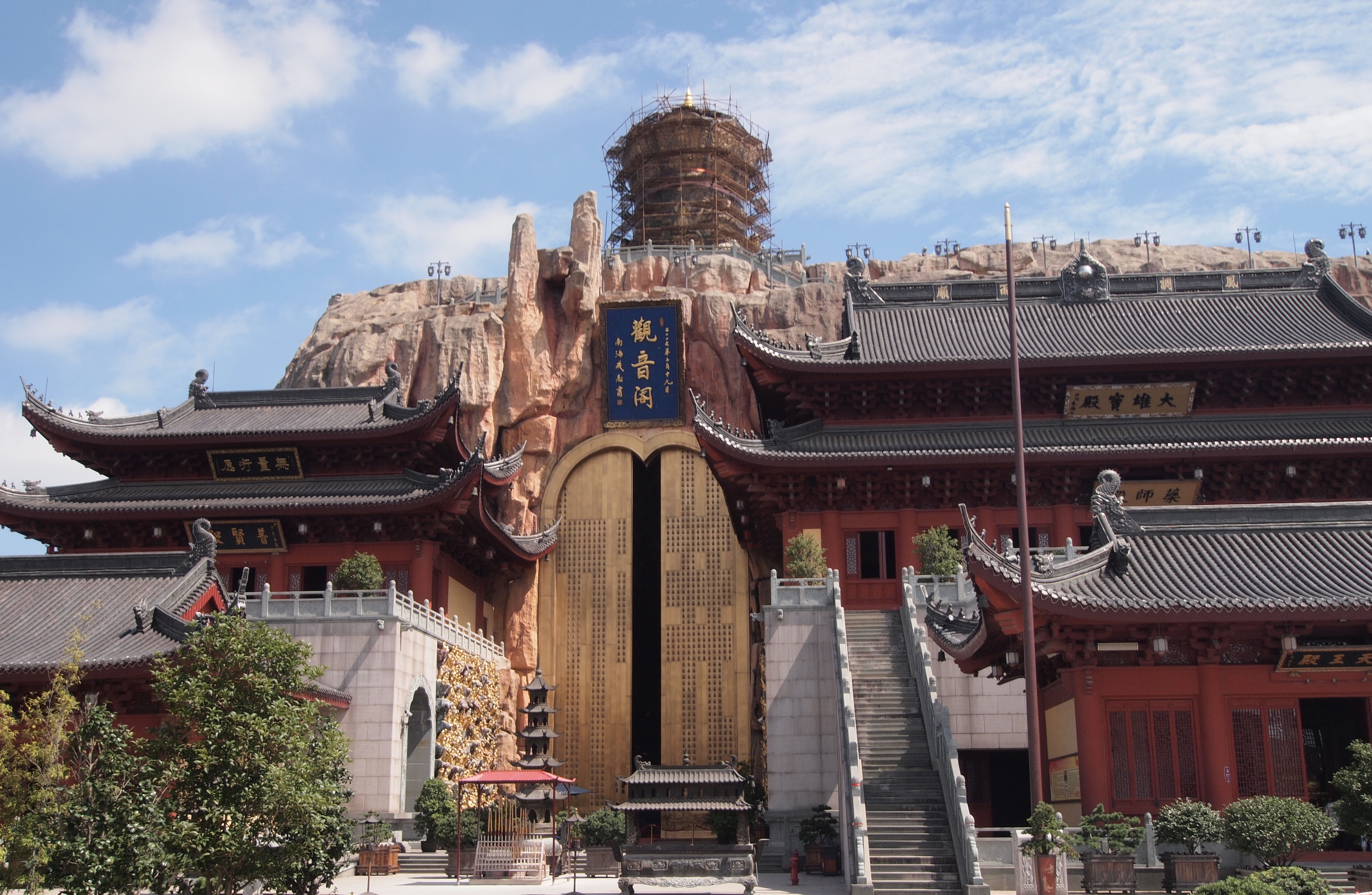
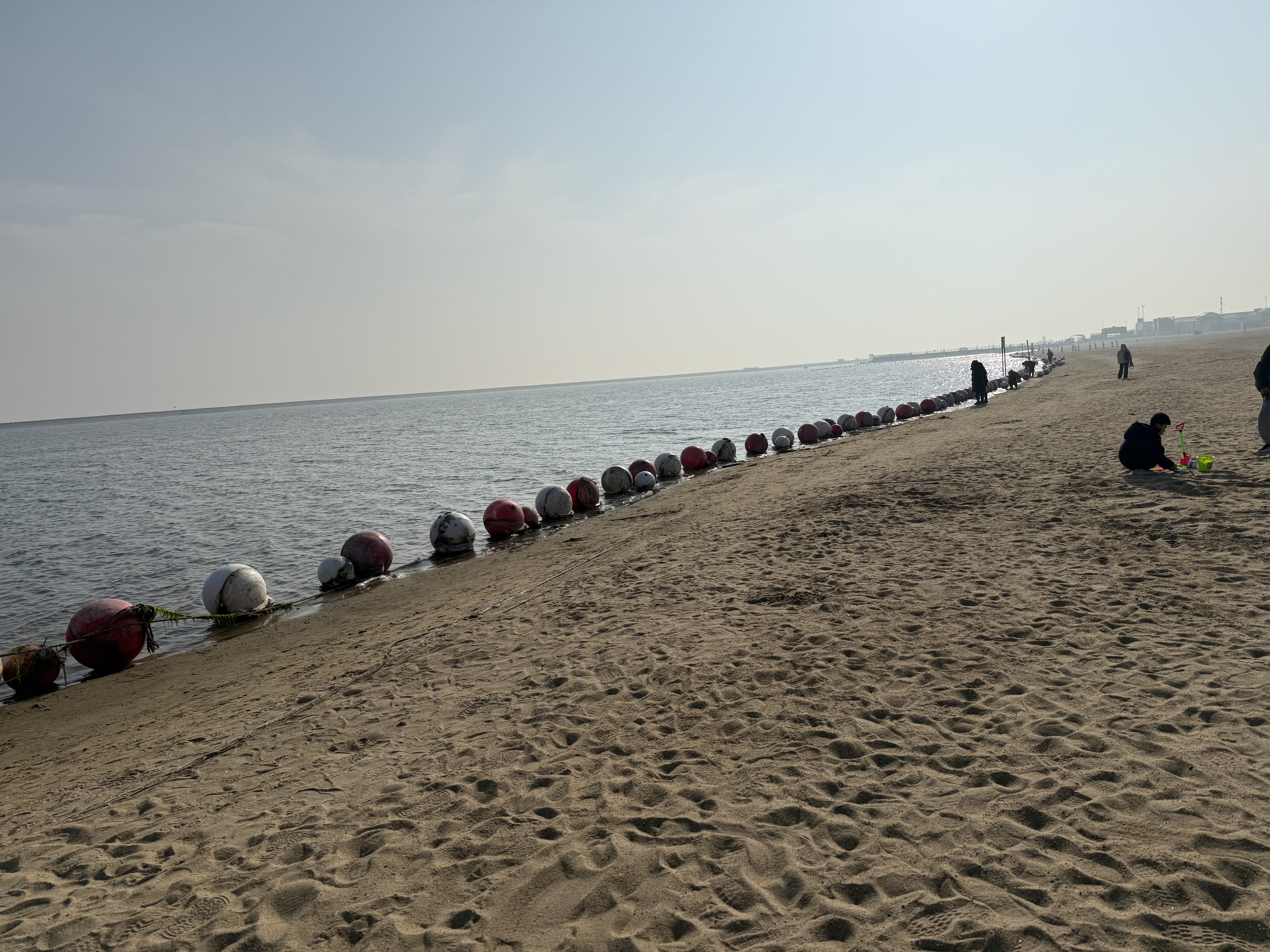
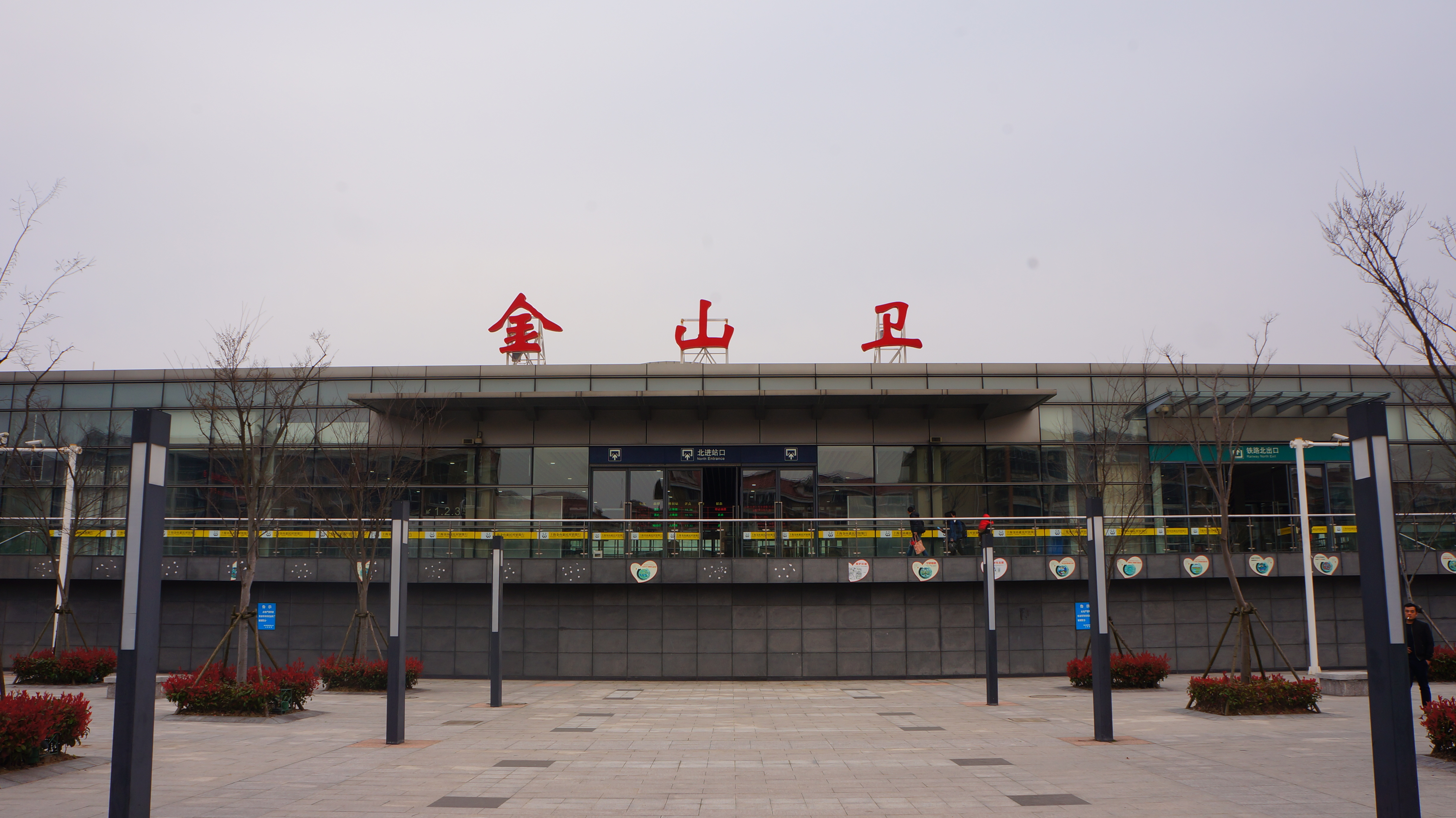
- Fengjing Ancient Town Donglin Temple Jinshan City Beach Jinshanwei

- Jinshan in Shanghai
- Interactive map of Jinshan
- Country: People's Republic of China
- Municipality: Shanghai

Area
  - Total: 586.14 km^{2} (226.31 sq mi)

Population (2020)
  - Total: 822,776
  - Density: 1,403.7/km^{2} (3,635.6/sq mi)
- Time zone: UTC+8 (China Standard)
- Postal code: 200540
- Area code: +86 (0)21
- Website: https://en.jinshan.gov.cn/

Jinshan, Shanghai
- Traditional Chinese: 金山區
- Simplified Chinese: 金山区
- Wugniu: cin^{1} sae^{1} chiu^{1}
- Postal: Kinshan
- Literal meaning: Gold Mountain District
Transcriptions
Standard Mandarin
- Hanyu Pinyin: Jīnshān Qū
Wu
- Wugniu: cin^{1} sae^{1} chiu^{1}
- IPA: Shanghainese: [tɕin˥ se˧ tɕʰy˨]
Yue: Cantonese
- Jyutping: gam^{1} saan^{1} keoi^{1}

Jinshan County
- Traditional Chinese: 金山縣
- Simplified Chinese: 金山县
- Wugniu: cin^{1} sae^{1} yoe^{6}
Transcriptions
Standard Mandarin
- Hanyu Pinyin: Jīnshān Xiàn
Wu
- Wugniu: cin^{1} sae^{1} yoe^{6}
- IPA: Shanghainese: [tɕin˥ se˧ ɦyø˨]
Yue: Cantonese
- Jyutping: gam^{1} saan^{1} jyun^{6}

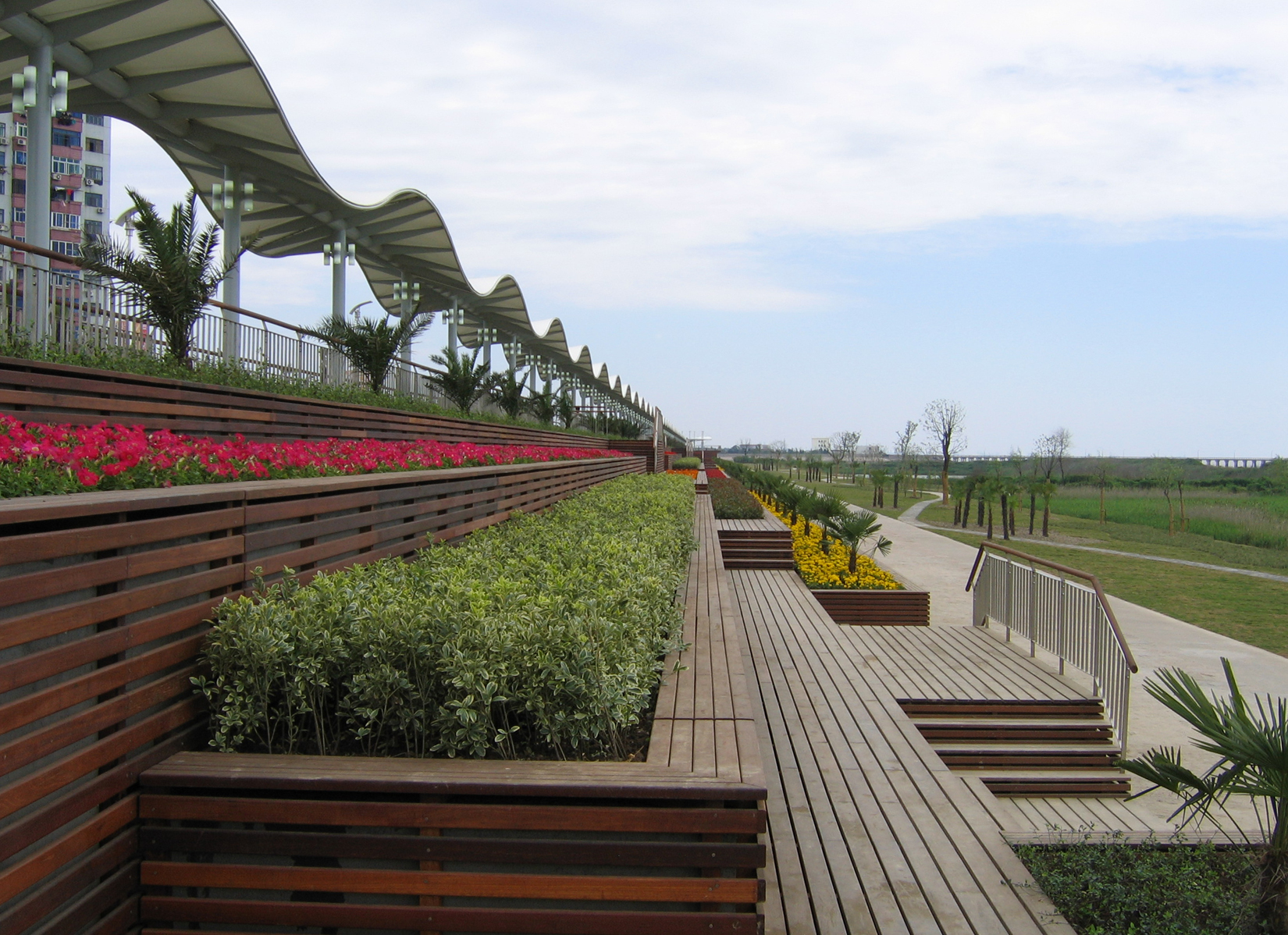
Shaded walkway and viewing area at Jinshan Beach, China

Jinshan District is a suburban district of southwestern Shanghai, neighboring Zhejiang province and Hangzhou Bay. It has a land area of 586.14 square kilometers (226.31 sq mi) and a population of 732,500 as of the 2010 Chinese census. Jinshan District, located in the southwest of Shanghai, is one of the biggest districts of the city. Local political administration is divided into nine towns and one subdistrict. About 6.2 kilometers (3.9 mi) off the coast of Jinshan, there are three islands named Dajinshan ("Big Gold Mountain"), Xiaojinshan ("Little Gold Mountain"), and Fushan ("Floating Mountain"). At 103 meters (338 ft) above sea level, the peak of Dajinshan Island is the highest point within the Shanghai municipality. There are several beaches along the 23.3-kilometer (14.5 mi) shoreline, which are popular tourism destinations.

As the city of Shanghai has grown, Jinshan has experienced rapid changes, evolving from a relatively rural area to a more suburban environment. With completion of the high-speed highway in 2008, a new bus line was opened between central Shanghai and Jinshan. This Shimei Line (t 石梅線, s 石梅线) travels between the bus station in Jinshan and another beside the Jinjiang Park station on Line 1 of the Shanghai Metro. Travel time is about an hour, depending on traffic and time of day, and costs 10 RMB each way.

Since 2012, the Shanghai Suburban Railway system also offers connections to Jinshan. This service, the Jinshan Railway, connects Jinshanwei railway station to Shanghai South railway station in downtown Shanghai in about 30 minutes.

The district is home to the Donglin Temple, a Buddhist temple dedicated to Guanyin, the bodhisattva of compassion. Jinshan peasant painting, which originated in the town of Fengjing, has become a nationally and internationally exhibited form of folk art.

== Economy ==
Jinshan District is home to the headquarters of Shanghai Petrochemical Company Ltd and Jinshan Industrial Park.

== Tourist attractions ==
Going to Jinshan can be by a convenient suburban train from South Railway Station to Jinshan (10 RMB, 30min, non-stop). Check the schedule as the time between trains can be an hour.

Other attractions around Jinshan are:

- Ancient Town of Fengjing
- Donglin Temple.

=== Jinshan City Beach ===
Location: 5 Shihuaxincheng Road, Jinshan, Shanghai (free shuttle bus from train station in summer, 20 minute walk, or bus 2)
Admission fee: 20RMB (weekends) 10RMB (week days) Jinshanwei town is home to Jinshan City Beach, one of the few beaches within the city boundaries of Shanghai. The large beach with imported sand from Hainan is clean and boxed-in by a concrete wall. Locals prefer sitting in a tent over sunbathing. It offers facilities including restaurants, toilets, and for (100RMB for 90min) 5 beach volleyball and 3 beach soccer fields, trampoline, water balloon shooting, and jetski.

It is a favorite spot for couples take their pre-wedding pictures. An annual beach fireworks display is held in August.

=== Jinshan Binhai Park ===
Location: 16 Xincheng Road, Shihua Street, Jinshan, Shanghai

Nearby Jinshan City Beach is a seaside park. There are large lawns, large artificial lakes, rockery buildings and pavilions in the park including a small children's playground with amusement facilities such as bumper cars, swivel chairs, rotating cups, and sheep carts.

=== Jinshanzui Fishing Village ===
Jinshanwei is the site of the historic Jinshanzui Fishing Village (Jinshanzui Yucun, 金山嘴渔村) located 30 minute walk from the beach or five minutes by taxi. It is a small village on Hangzhou Bay with the earliest (dating back more than 2,000 years) and last fishing village in Shanghai. Xiangyu Lake in summer has thousands of lotus flowers. Tourist attractions include teahouses, small inns, seafood specialties (shrimp, sea eel and jelly fish head), fishery museum and a folk art gallery.

== Subdistrict and towns ==
Jinshan District has one subdistrict, nine towns and one special township-level division.

| Name | Chinese (S) | Hanyu Pinyin | Shanghainese Romanization | Population (2010) | Area (km^{2}) |
|---|---|---|---|---|---|
| Shihua Subdistrict | 石化街道 | Shíhuà Jiēdào | zaq hau ka do | 87,901 | 19.13 |
| Caojing | 漕泾镇 | Cáojīng Zhèn | dzo cin tzen | 40,722 | 44.92 |
| Fengjing | 枫泾镇 | Fēngjīng Zhèn | fon cin tzen | 82,477 | 91.67 |
| Jinshanwei | 金山卫镇 | Jīnshānwèi Zhèn | cin se we tzen | 70,819 | 54.93 |
| Langxia | 廊下镇 | Lángxià Zhèn | laon rau tzen | 33,658 | 46.56 |
| Lüxiang | 吕巷镇 | Lǚxiàng Zhèn | liu raon tzen | 52,808 | 59.74 |
| Shanyang | 山阳镇 | Shānyáng Zhèn | se yan tzen | 84,640 | 42.12 |
| Tinglin | 亭林镇 | Tínglín Zhèn | din lin tzen | 93,758 | 79.12 |
| Zhangyan | 张堰镇 | Zhāngyàn Zhèn | tzan i tzen | 37,057 | 35.15 |
| Zhujing | 朱泾镇 | Zhūjīng Zhèn | tzyu zyu cin tzen | 120,084 | 75.67 |
| Jinshan Industry Zone | 金山工业区 | Jīnshān Gōngyèqū | cin se kon gniq chiu | 28,514 | 58.00 |

== Climate ==
Climate data for Jinshan District (1991–2020 normals, extremes 1951–present)
| Month | Jan | Feb | Mar | Apr | May | Jun | Jul | Aug | Sep | Oct | Nov | Dec | Year |
|---|---|---|---|---|---|---|---|---|---|---|---|---|---|
| Record high °C (°F) | 22.9 (73.2) | 27.3 (81.1) | 30.7 (87.3) | 33.7 (92.7) | 36.5 (97.7) | 36.5 (97.7) | 39.4 (102.9) | 40.2 (104.4) | 37.4 (99.3) | 34.8 (94.6) | 29.0 (84.2) | 23.8 (74.8) | 40.2 (104.4) |
| Mean daily maximum °C (°F) | 8.4 (47.1) | 10.3 (50.5) | 14.0 (57.2) | 19.6 (67.3) | 24.5 (76.1) | 27.4 (81.3) | 31.8 (89.2) | 31.5 (88.7) | 27.9 (82.2) | 23.2 (73.8) | 17.6 (63.7) | 11.3 (52.3) | 20.6 (69.1) |
| Daily mean °C (°F) | 4.5 (40.1) | 6.2 (43.2) | 9.9 (49.8) | 15.1 (59.2) | 20.3 (68.5) | 24.0 (75.2) | 28.4 (83.1) | 28.2 (82.8) | 24.1 (75.4) | 18.8 (65.8) | 13.3 (55.9) | 7.0 (44.6) | 16.7 (62.0) |
| Mean daily minimum °C (°F) | 1.5 (34.7) | 2.9 (37.2) | 6.4 (43.5) | 11.4 (52.5) | 16.8 (62.2) | 21.4 (70.5) | 25.7 (78.3) | 25.6 (78.1) | 21.2 (70.2) | 15.3 (59.5) | 9.6 (49.3) | 3.5 (38.3) | 13.4 (56.2) |
| Record low °C (°F) | −10.8 (12.6) | −9.0 (15.8) | −5.1 (22.8) | −1.1 (30.0) | 5.9 (42.6) | 12.6 (54.7) | 16.4 (61.5) | 18.2 (64.8) | 10.6 (51.1) | −0.1 (31.8) | −3.3 (26.1) | −8.8 (16.2) | −10.8 (12.6) |
| Average precipitation mm (inches) | 75.1 (2.96) | 71.4 (2.81) | 107.0 (4.21) | 88.0 (3.46) | 102.0 (4.02) | 218.3 (8.59) | 131.1 (5.16) | 167.7 (6.60) | 108.1 (4.26) | 64.4 (2.54) | 64.4 (2.54) | 54.5 (2.15) | 1,252 (49.3) |
| Average precipitation days (≥ 0.1 mm) | 11.6 | 10.6 | 13.7 | 12.1 | 11.9 | 15.1 | 11.4 | 12.0 | 10.2 | 7.3 | 9.7 | 8.8 | 134.4 |
| Average snowy days | 2.3 | 1.7 | 0.3 | 0 | 0 | 0 | 0 | 0 | 0 | 0 | 0.1 | 0.8 | 5.2 |
| Average relative humidity (%) | 78 | 78 | 78 | 78 | 79 | 84 | 82 | 82 | 81 | 79 | 78 | 76 | 79 |
| Mean monthly sunshine hours | 114.9 | 117.8 | 140.8 | 164.0 | 177.9 | 140.8 | 225.6 | 219.5 | 176.9 | 168.3 | 135.2 | 133.2 | 1,914.9 |
| Percentage possible sunshine | 36 | 37 | 38 | 42 | 42 | 33 | 53 | 54 | 48 | 48 | 43 | 42 | 43 |
Source: China Meteorological Administration All-time September high All-time October high

== Notable residents ==
- Qian Zhijun - A Chinese actor and entertainer who first gained fame as part of the "Little Fatty" internet meme

== Transportation ==
=== Commuter rail ===
Jinshan is served by one suburban line operated by China Railway:

- Jinshan railway – Tinglin, Jinshan Industrial Park, Jinshanwei

Jinshan is the only administrative division in Shanghai that does not any lines and stations of the Shanghai Metro run into.
