= Donglin Temple (Shanghai) =

Buddhist temple in Shanghai, China

Guan Yin Hall of the temple
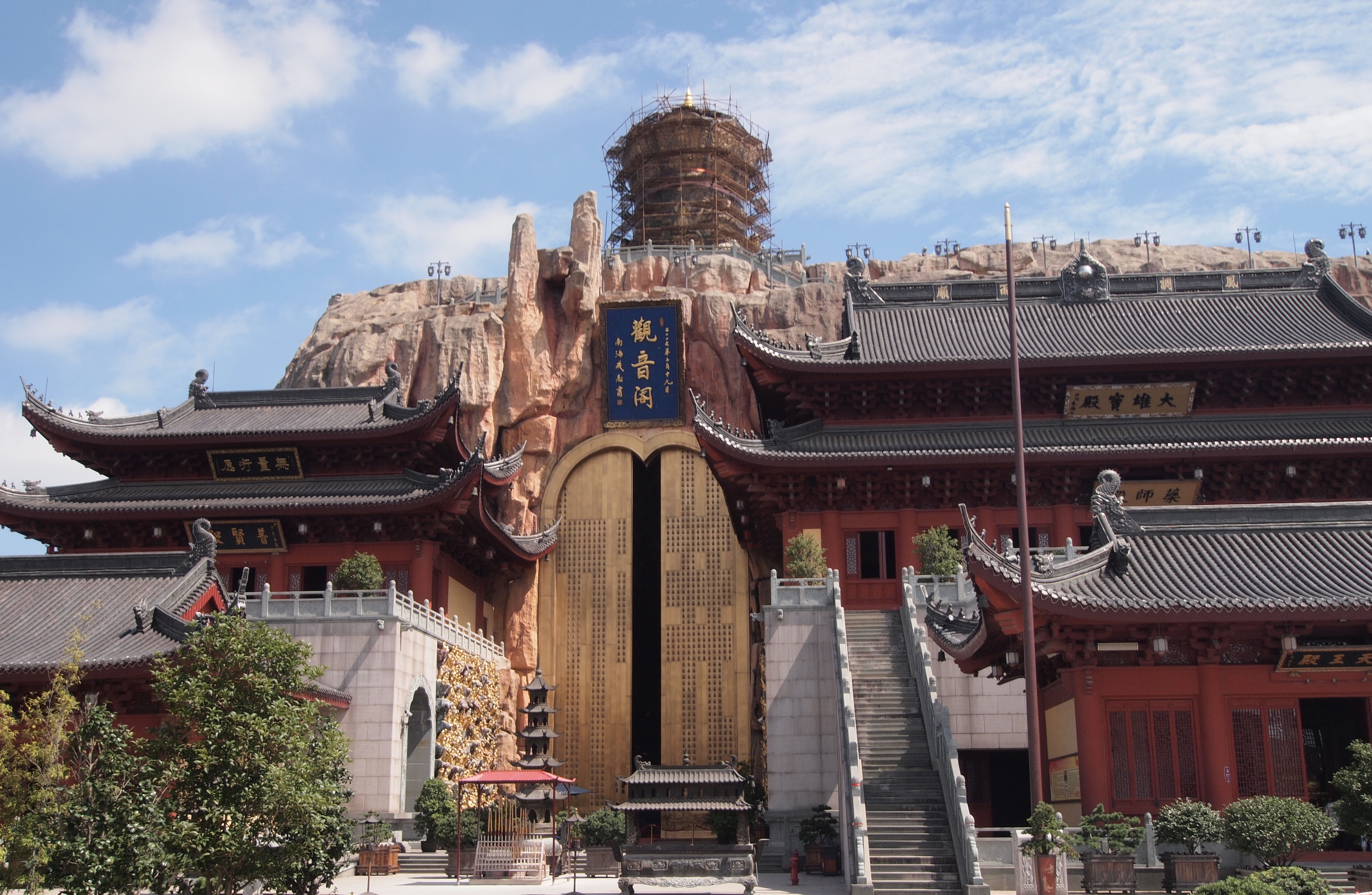
- Guan Yin Hall of the temple

- Location in Jinshan District, Shanghai, China

Religion
- Affiliation: Buddhism

Location
- Location: No. 150 Donglin Street, Zhujing Town, Jinshan District, Shanghai.
- Country: China
- Coordinates: 30°53′47.59″N 121°9′38.30″E

Architecture
- Completed: 1308

The Donglin Temple (Chinese: 東林寺; pinyin: Dōnglín Sì; lit. 'East Wood Temple') is a Buddhist temple located in the town of Zhujing, Jinshan District, Shanghai, China. It is dedicated to Guanyin, the bodhisattva of compassion.

== History ==
The temple was first constructed during the Yuan Dynasty in 1308, but has been destroyed repeatedly by war, fire, neglect, and to make way for reconstruction. The only remaining historical building on the site (a hall) was listed as a city-level protected cultural site in 1987. The temple was complete redesigned and rebuilt in the years 2004 to 2007.

== Architectural layout ==
As of 2010, the temple has occupied a 20-hectare site. The main entrance gate of the complex is reached via three parallel bridges.

The central feature of the temple's courtyard is a 5.4-meter-tall statue of Shancai, the Child of Wealth (Chinese: 善財童子; pinyin: Shàncáitóngzǐ), decorated with Cloisonné enamel. The statue is surrounded by 8 copper fish with opened mouth into which visitors can toss coins.

In the back of the courtyard lies, the main building of the temple, the Guanyin Dian. The hall's exterior mimics a large red natural cliff. The entrance gate to the building is about 20 meters high and 10 meters wide. Its bronze doors are decorated with 999 relief images of Buddha. The hall is 31 meters wide, 42 meters deep, and 31 meters high and houses a gilded statue of the thousand-armed Guanyin. The statue is 27 meters tall and stands on a 2-meter-high lotus base. Its arms are up to 5 meters in length.

== Location ==
The temple is located to in the southwest of Shanghai, on the corner of Renmin Road and Donglin Street. Its address is: No. 150 Donglin Street, Zhujing Town, Jinshan District, Shanghai.
