= Jinshanwei railway station =

Railway station in Shanghai, China

Jinshanwei 金山卫
- Station exterior

General information
- Location: South Weiyang Road; Jinshan District, Shanghai; China
- Coordinates: 30°43′48″N 121°21′30″E
- System: Shanghai Suburban Railway commuter rail
- Line: Jinshan Railway
- Tracks: 5

Construction
- Structure type: At grade and elevated
- Parking: Surface lot

History
- Opened: September 28, 2012

Services
Preceding station	China Railway	Following station
Jinshan Industrial Park towards Shanghai South	Jinshan railway	Terminus
Location

Jinshanwei (simplified Chinese: 金山卫; traditional Chinese: 金山衛; pinyin: Jīnshānwèi) is a railway station on the Jinshan railway of the Shanghai Suburban Railway located in Jinshan District, Shanghai. It opened for intercity passenger service on September 28, 2012. Jinshanwei currently has four platforms. The station serves both express and local service trains. In April 2013, a Park and ride scheme was introduced, encouraging commuters to park their cars at the station and continue their travels by train to downtown Shanghai.

Jinshanwei station is within walking distance of Jinshan City Beach, one of the few beaches within the city boundaries of Shanghai, as well as the historic Jinshanzui Fishing Village, billed as 'the last Fishing Village in Shanghai'.
