= Xinqiao =

Xinqiao (simplified Chinese: 新桥; traditional Chinese: 新橋; pinyin: Xīnqiáo; lit. 'New Bridge') may refer to a number of locations in China:

== Transport ==
- Hefei Xinqiao International Airport, the main airport in Hefei, Anhui Province, China
- Xinqiao railway station, on the Shanghai–Kunming Railway in Songjiang District, Shanghai, China
- Xinqiao station (Chongqing Rail Transit), a metro station on Line 9 (Chongqing Rail Transit)
- Xinqiao station (Wenzhou Rail Transit), a metro station on Line S1 (Wenzhou Rail Transit)

== Towns ==
- Xinqiao, Changting County, Fujian
- Xinqiao, Zhangping, Fujian
- Xinqiao, Guangdong, in Gaoyao
- Xinqiao, Binyang County, in Binyang County, Guangxi
- Xinqiao, Yulin, Guangxi, in Yuzhou District, Yulin, Guangxi
- Xinqiao, Guizhou, in Anlong County
- Xinqiao, Xiangcheng City, Henan
- Xinqiao, Hengshan, a town of Hengshan County, Hunan.
- Xinqiao, Hengyang, in Hengshan County, Hunan
- Xinqiao, Zhangjiajie, in Yongding District, Zhangjiajie, Hunan
- Xinqiao, Changzhou, in Xinbei District, Changzhou, Jiangsu
- Xinqiao, Zhenjiang, in Danyang, Jiangsu
- Xinqiao, Jiangyin, Jiangsu
- Xinqiao, Jingjiang, Jiangsu
- Xinqiao, Shanghai, in Songjiang District, Shanghai
- Xinqiao, Mianyang, in Youxian District, Mianyang, Sichuan
- Xinqiao, Zigong, in Rong County, Sichuan
- Xinqiao, Suining, in Chuanshan District, Suining, Sichuan
- Xinqiao, Zizhong County, Sichuan
- Xinqiao, Yunnan, in Mouding County
- Xinqiao, Taizhou, Zhejiang, in Luqiao District
- Xinqiao, Ningbo, in Xiangshan County, Zhejiang
- Xinqiao, Zhangjiajie, a town of Yongding District in Zhangjiajie, Hunan

== Townships ==
- Xinqiao Township, Fujian, in Taining County
- Xinqiao Township, Henan, in Yongcheng
- Xinqiao Township, Guang'an, in Guang'an District, Guang'an, Sichuan
- Xinqiao Township, Xiaojin County, Sichuan
- Xinqiao Township, Zhejiang, in Changshan County

== Subdistricts ==
- Xinqiao Subdistrict, Chongqing, in Shapingba District
- Xinqiao Subdistrict, Zhangzhou, in Xiangcheng District, Zhangzhou, Fujian
- Xinqiao Subdistrict, Wenzhou, in Ouhai District, Wenzhou, Zhejiang

== Village ==
- Xinqiao, Huilong, a village in Huilong, Hanchuan, Xiaogan, Hubei
