= Songjiang North railway station =

Railway station in Shanghai, China

Songjiang North
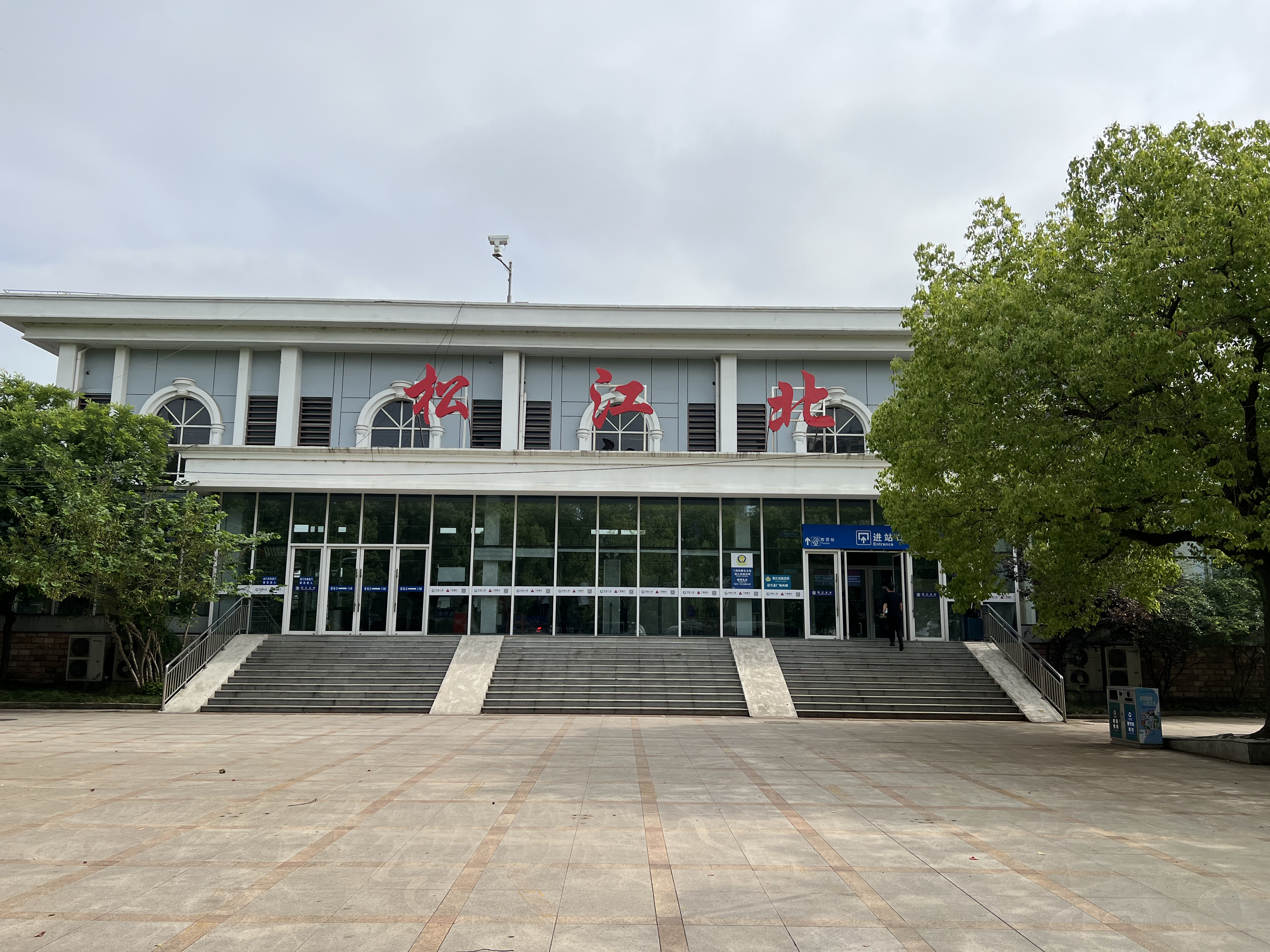

Chinese name
- Simplified Chinese: 松江北站
- Traditional Chinese: 松江北站
Transcriptions
Standard Mandarin
- Hanyu Pinyin: Sōngjiāng Běi Zhàn

General information
- Location: No.1 South Renming Road, Songjiang District, Shanghai; China
- Coordinates: 31°00′07.4″N 121°13′24.4″E
- Operator: China Railway Shanghai Group; China Railway Corporation
- Line: Shanghai–Hangzhou Railway (Note: part of the Shanghai–Kunming railway)
- Platforms: 3 (1 island platform, 1 side platform)
- Connections: Zuibaichi Park; Bus terminal

History
- Opened: 1909
- Closed: 10 December 2024
- Rebuilt: 1945; 2000
- Former names: Songjiang railway station
Location

Songjiang North railway station was a third-class passenger-and-freight railway station on the former route of Shanghai–Hangzhou Railway located in Songjiang District, Shanghai, China.

Formerly Songjiang railway Station, the station renamed to its current name on May 22, 2024. The station closed on December 10 in the same year.

The station handled an average of 1,200-1,500 passengers per day.

== History ==
The station opened in 1909 with the completion of the Shanghai-Hangzhou Railway. It is also called "Songjiang West railway station" at that time.

Japanese warplanes bombed the station on 8 September 1937, during the Second Sino-Japanese War. At the time, a train carrying refugees to Hangzhou was stopping at the station. The bombing reportedly killed over 300 people and seriously injured a further 400.

In 1941, Central China Railway rebuilt the station. The rebuilt station was pointed, resembling a church.

On 5 November 1955, the special train of Mao Zedong stopped at the station. Mao listened to reports and met with Li Chu, then secretary of the Songjiang Prefectural Party Committee. The special train stopped for a total of 52 minutes.

Before 1990, the passenger flow of the Station mainly came from Songjiang and the surrounding Qingpu and Jinshan areas, mainly residents visiting relatives or going to urban Shanghai for business. The station's passenger flow was once ranked first among Shanghai's suburban stations, and it once set a record of sending more than 10,000 passengers per day. After 1990, with the development of highway transportation and changes in Songjiang's population structure, the station's passenger flow began to be dominated by migrant workers.

In 1997, the station began its second rebuild. This includes the reconstruction and expansion of the station building and yard. Platform 2 and 3 was completed and put into use on January 17, 1997, and platform 1 was put into use on June 19. The old station building was demolished on October 26, 1999, a new on was rebuilt on the original site and put into use on September 20, 2000.

On April 14, 2024, the station stopped handling freights; On May 22, it was renamed to Songjiang North railway station; On December 10, the station stopped handling passengers. The station was closed.

Starting from 13 December 2024, the passenger trains are redirected to the newly expanded Shanghai Songjiang railway station, and freights trains to the rebuilt Shihudang Station

== Structure ==
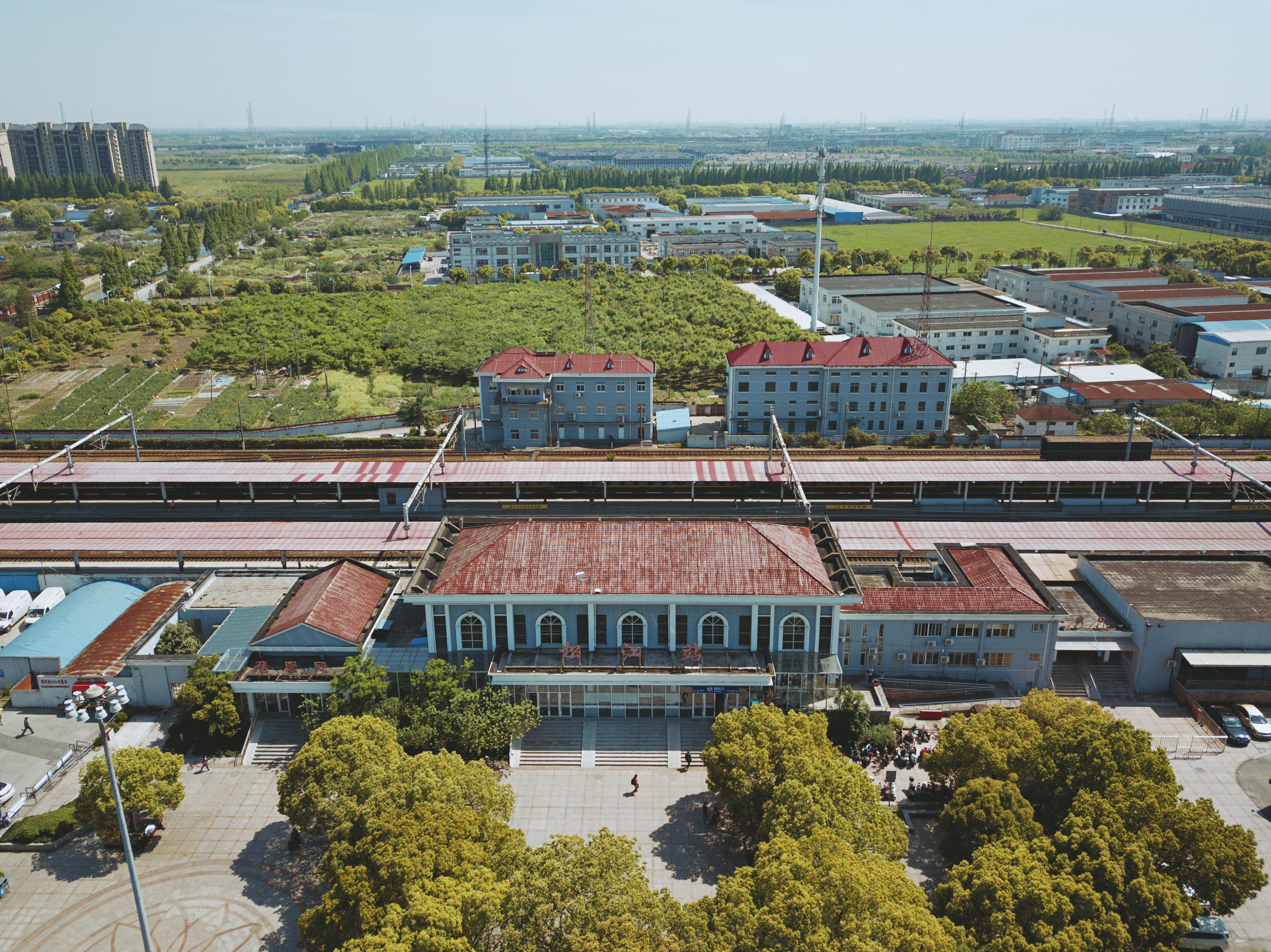
An aerial view of the station in 2019

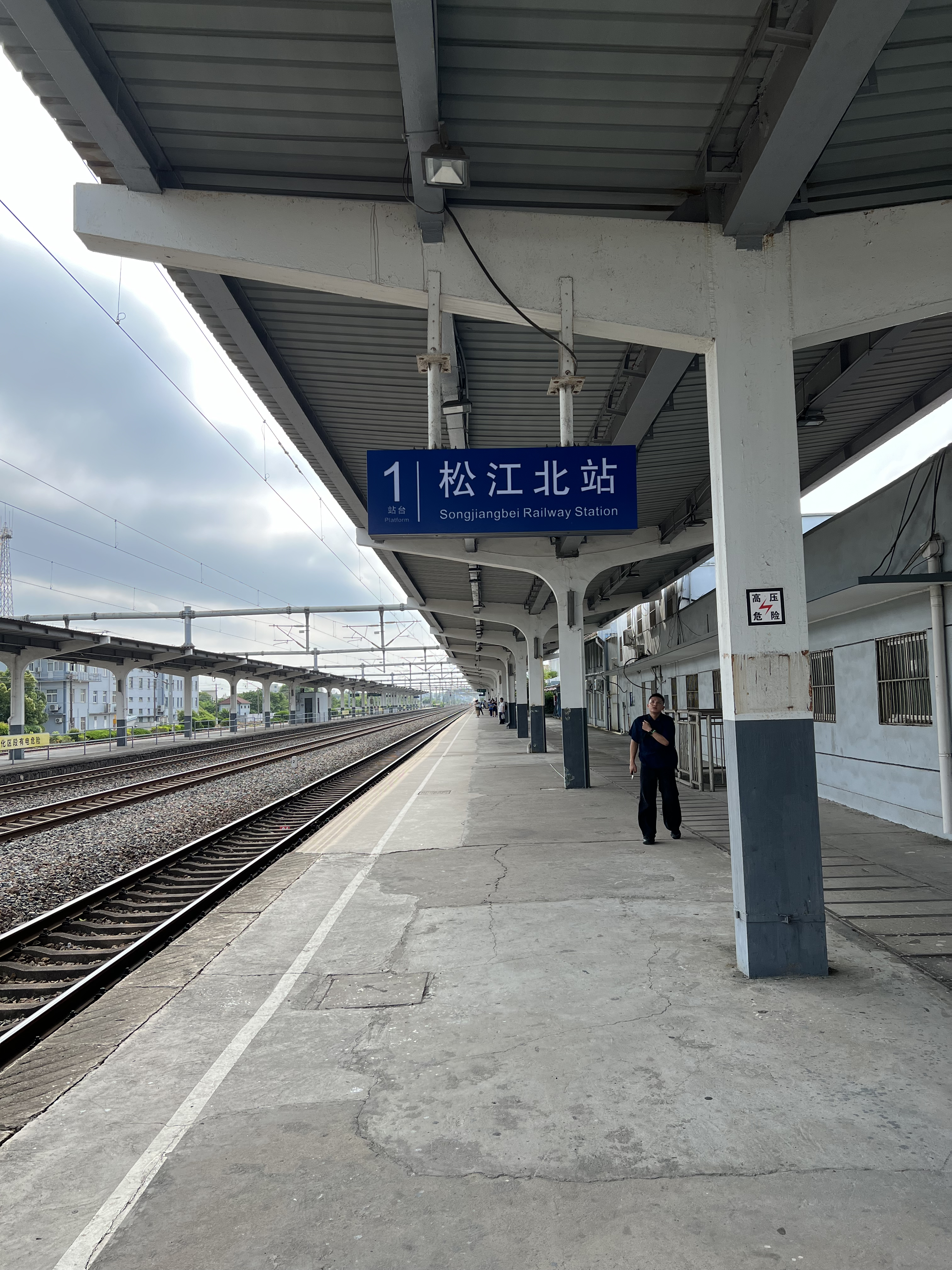
Platform 1 of the station

The current station building was built in 2000. It is 141 m (463 ft) long, 18 m (59 ft) wide, 12.4 m (41 ft) high, and covers an area of 2,512 m^{2} (27,040 sq ft). The building was yellow outside, later painted blue.

From east to west, the station building includes a ticket office, waiting room, baggage room and other facilities, with an area of 157 m^{2} (1,690 sq ft), 530 m^{2} (5,700 sq ft) and 238 m^{2} (2,560 sq ft) respectively.

The station has two platforms and six tracks, including one island platform and one side one. Both of which are low platforms.

The freight yard is located on the southeast side of the station, covering an area of 200 sq in. The equipment includes 4 loading and unloading lines, 2 warehouses, 2 cranes, 1 wheel loader and 2 forklifts, which are responsible for handling the freights of the station.

Side Platform
Platform 1	Shanghai–Kunming railway (SH-KM) To Shanghai (Next: Xinqiao)
Through track	SH-KM Upbound
Platform 2	Downbound To Kunming (Next: Shihudang)
Island Platform
Platform 3	SH-KM To Kunming (Next: Shihudang)
Siding track	SH-KM
(not platform)
Siding track	SH-KM
Siding track	SH-KM

Because the station has an old fashioned decoration, several scenes in films were taken there, for example, Jia Zhangke's Platform.
