= Three Gun =

Chinese clothing company

Shanghai Three Gun Clothing Manufacturing Factory Co Ltd
- Simplified Chinese: 上海三枪集团有限公司
- Traditional Chinese: 上海三槍集團有限公司
Transcriptions
Standard Mandarin
- Hanyu Pinyin: Shànghǎi Sānqiāng Jítuán Yǒuxiàngōngsī

Shanghai Three Gun Clothing Manufacturing Factory Co Ltd (Chinese: 三枪; pinyin: Sānqiāng) is a clothing company headquartered in Pudong, Shanghai.

It was previously based in Huangpu District, and in Xinqiao Town in Songjiang District. It was established in 1991.

In 2017 the company collaborated with Mattel, and the American company's Fisher-Price subsidiary, in making a clothing line for infants and toddlers.

== See also ==
- Cosmo Lady - Chinese women's underwear manufacturer and retail store company based in Dongguan, Guangdong
