= Dongnan Linshen Area =

Dongnan Linshen
- Designated area
- 东南临深片区
- Country: People's Republic of China
- Province: Guangdong
- Prefecture-level city: Dongguan
- Time zone: UTC+8 (China Standard)

Dongnan Linshen Area (lit. Southeast Near-Shenzhen Area) is a designated area for city planning of Dongguan, Guangdong province, China.

== Economy ==
Underwear manufacturer Cosmo Lady's head office is in Fengdeling Village (凤德岭村; 鳳德嶺村; Fèngdélǐngcūn; fung6 dak1 ling5 cyun1), Fenggang Town, Dongnan Linshen Area.
