= Zuibaichi Park station =

Shanghai Metro station

Zuibaichi Park 醉白池
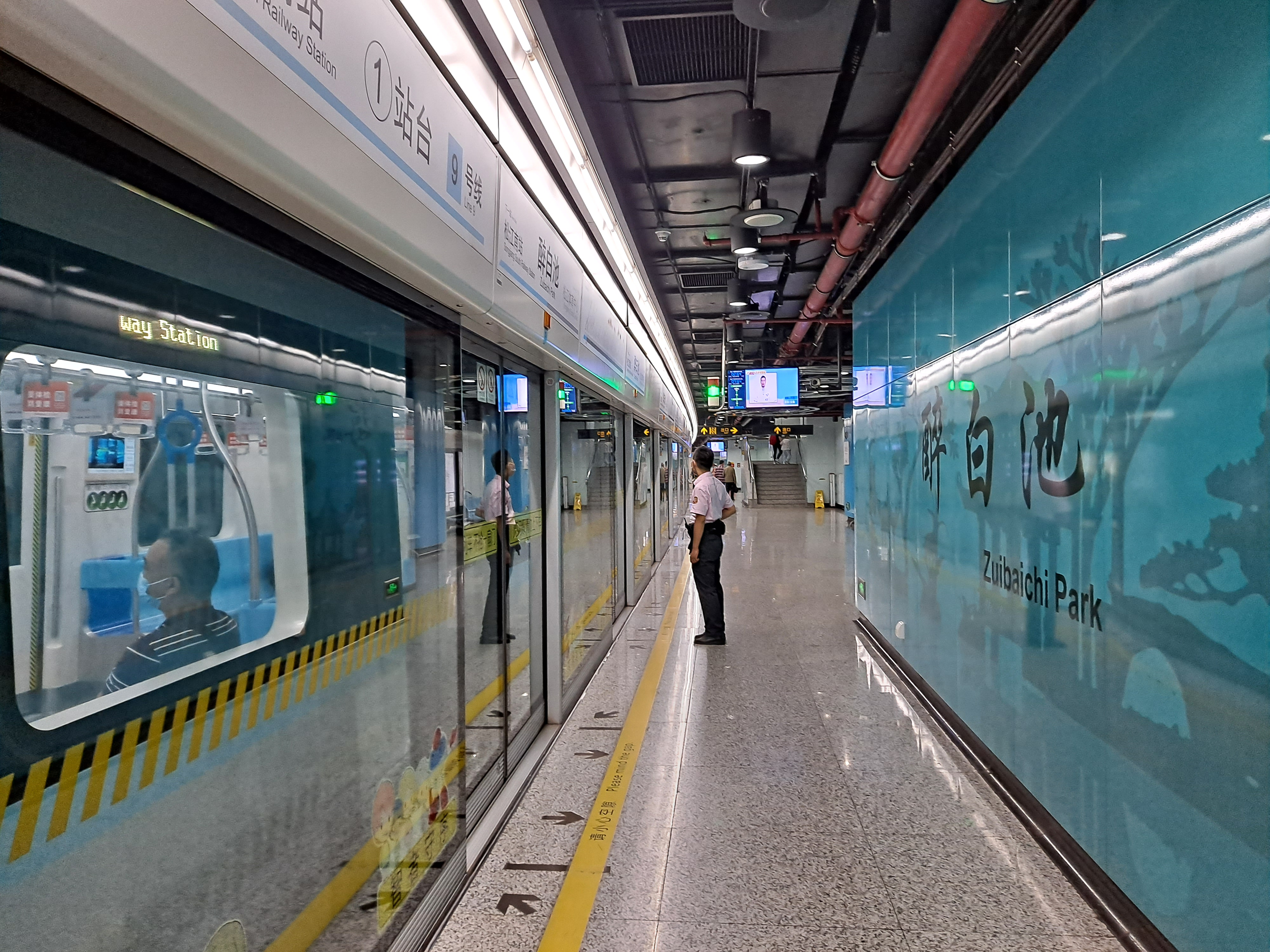
- Station platform

General information
- Location: South Renmin Road; Songjiang District, Shanghai; China
- Coordinates: 31.001°N 121.229°E
- Operator: Shanghai No. 1 Metro Operation Co. Ltd.
- Line: Line 9
- Platforms: 2 (1 island platform)
- Tracks: 2
- Connections: Songjiang North

Construction
- Structure type: Underground
- Accessible: Yes

History
- Opened: December 30, 2012

Services
Preceding station	Shanghai Metro	Following station
Shanghai Songjiang Railway Station Terminus	Line 9	Songjiang Sports Center towards Caolu
Location
- Location within Shanghai

Zuibaichi Park (Chinese: 醉白池; pinyin: Zuìbáichí) is a station on Line 9 of the Shanghai Metro, close to Songjiang North railway station. It began operation on December 30, 2012. It is named after the nearby garden of Zuibaichi.

== Around the station ==
- Songjiang Mosque
- Zuibaichi
