= Trams in Shanghai (1908–1975) =

First generation trams in Shanghai began operating in 1908 using a steel wheeled electric system until the last was closed in December 1, 1975. The last operating tram line in Shanghai was No. 3, which ran from Hongkou Park to Jiangwan Wujiaochang. It was dismantled in 1975, and replaced by the 93 bus (which later changed to the 139 bus). In the early days of operation, tram cars were partitioned to provide first- and second-class seating. Some trams, principally for the Chinese workers, were designated as third-class.

In 2010, the Zhangjiang Tram reintroduced this form of transport to Shanghai in the form of a single line in the Zhangjiang Hi-Tech Park in suburban Pudong. Additionally, in 2018 and 2019 two steel wheeled Songjiang Tram lines have opened in Songjiang District.

== Initial sections ==
The first proposal for a tram network in Shanghai was in 1881; Jardine Matheson proposed to the French Concession Board of Directors the opening of tram services in the French Concession, and both parties began planning for a tram network. The Board of Directors adopted the initiative and began planning a tram network.

The first tram line in Shanghai (China’s first tram appeared in Beijing in 1899), Yingshang No. 1, opened on January 21, 1908, and operated between Jing'an Temple and The Bund. The line was 6.04 kilometers long and operated by British commercial interests. Later that year, the French completed an 8.5 km tram line between The Bund and Xujiahui. In 1912, a locally operated Chinese system opened in Nanshi District. The Chinese system started on August 11, 1913.

On November 14, 1914, Shanghai was the first city in China to use trolleybuses in the former French Concession.

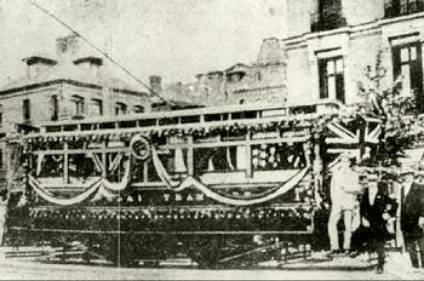
The first tram in Shanghai (1908)

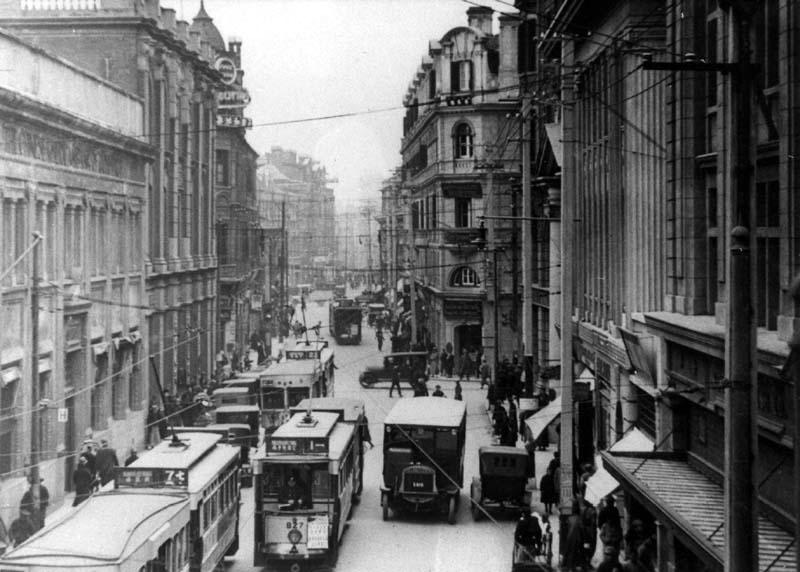
Trams on Jiujiang Road in the 1920s

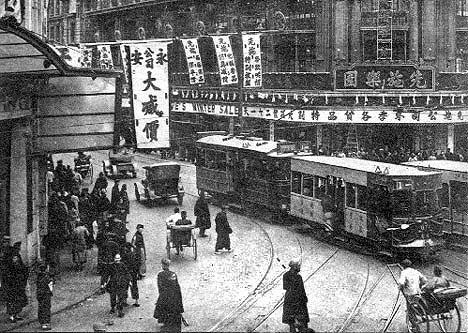
A tram in the 'British system' in the 1920s

== Three tramway systems ==
Three tram companies expanded their routes step by step, and collectively reached their maximum extent in 1925 with 328 tramcars and 14 routes. By the 1920s, trams carried supplementary letters to their numbers: 'B' for British and 'F' for French.

- The British system ("Shanghai Tramways"; The Shanghai Electric Construction Co. Ltd.) was the largest with seven routes and 216 trams;
- The French system ("La Compagnie Francaise de Tramways et d'Eclairage Electrique de Changhai") had three routes and 60 trams;
- The Chinese system ("Chinese Tramways Company"; Chinese Electric Power Co. Ltd.) had four routes and 52 trams, totaling 23.5 km in length.
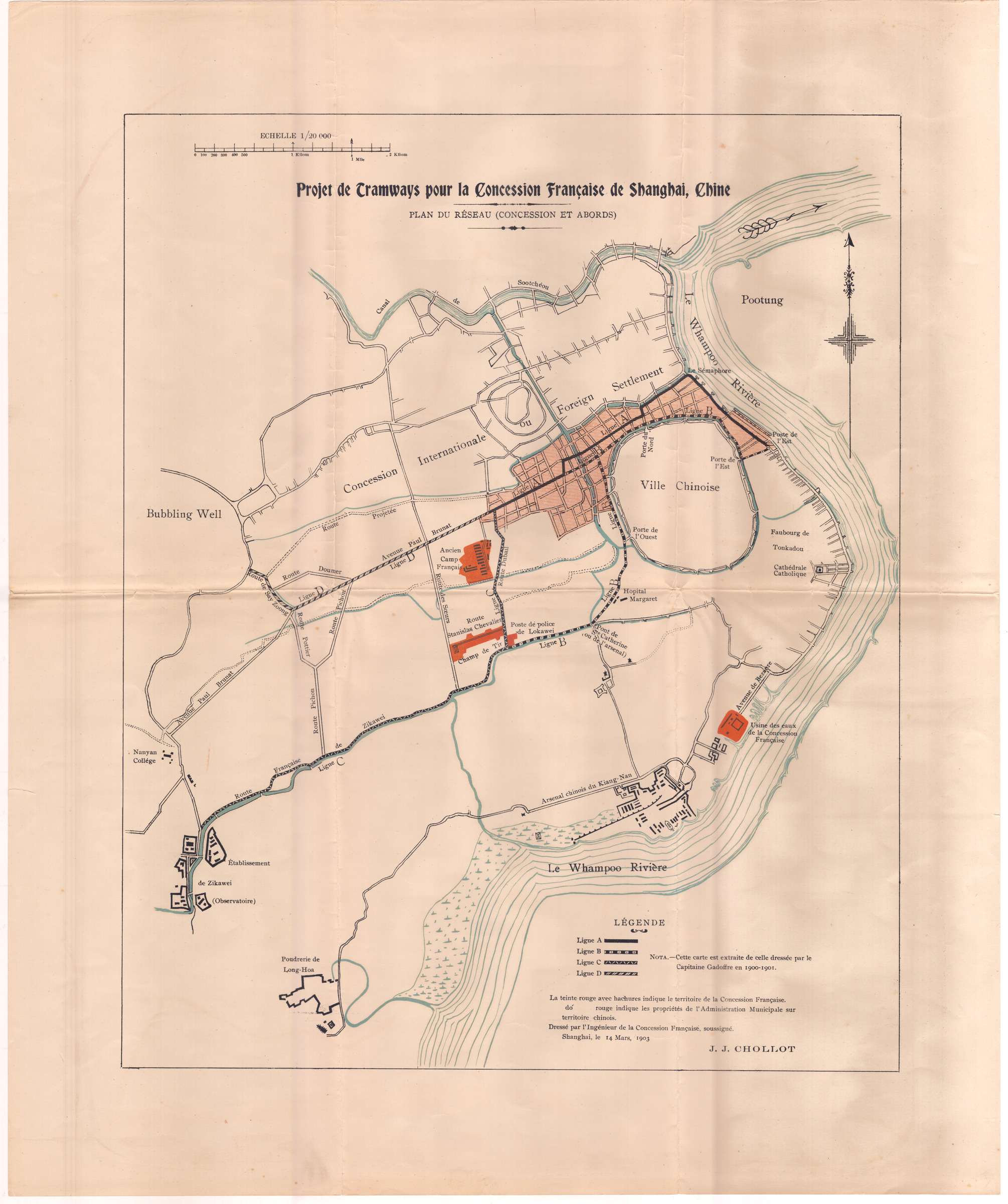
1903 map showing the built and planned tram routes in the French concession

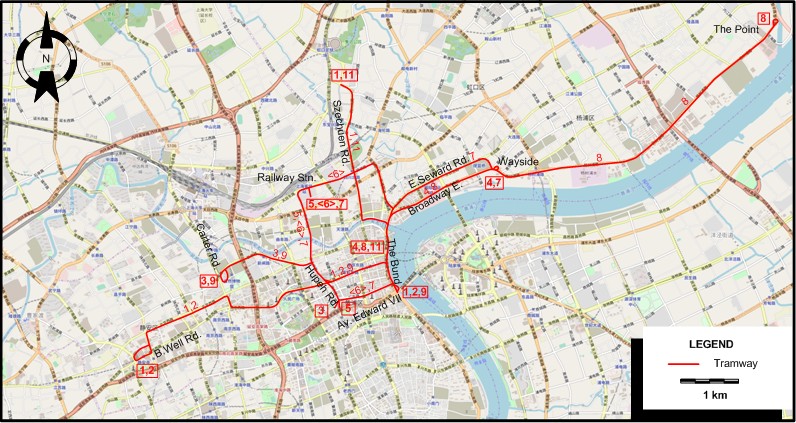
1936 Shanghai tram map on recent street map

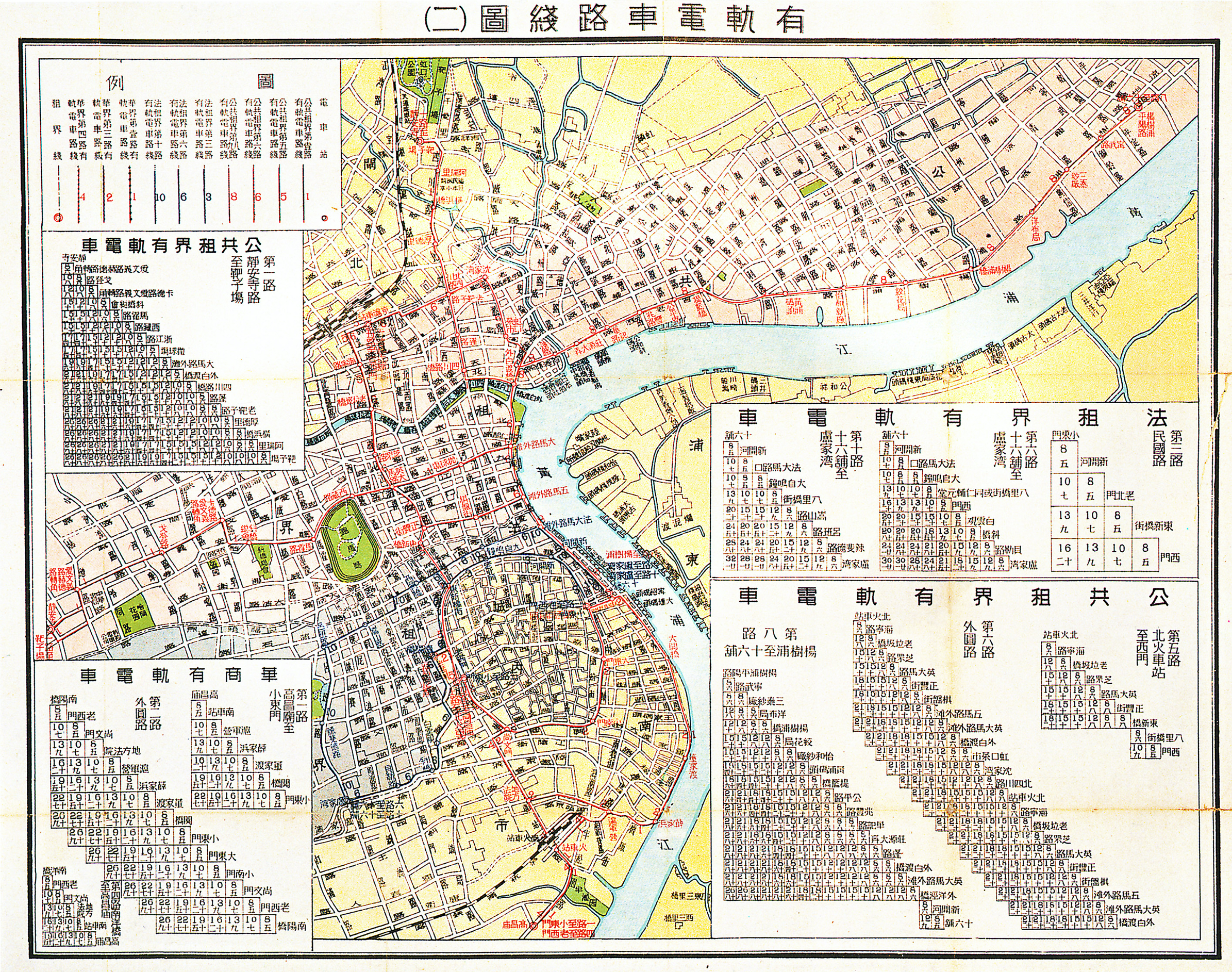
1936 Shanghai tram map

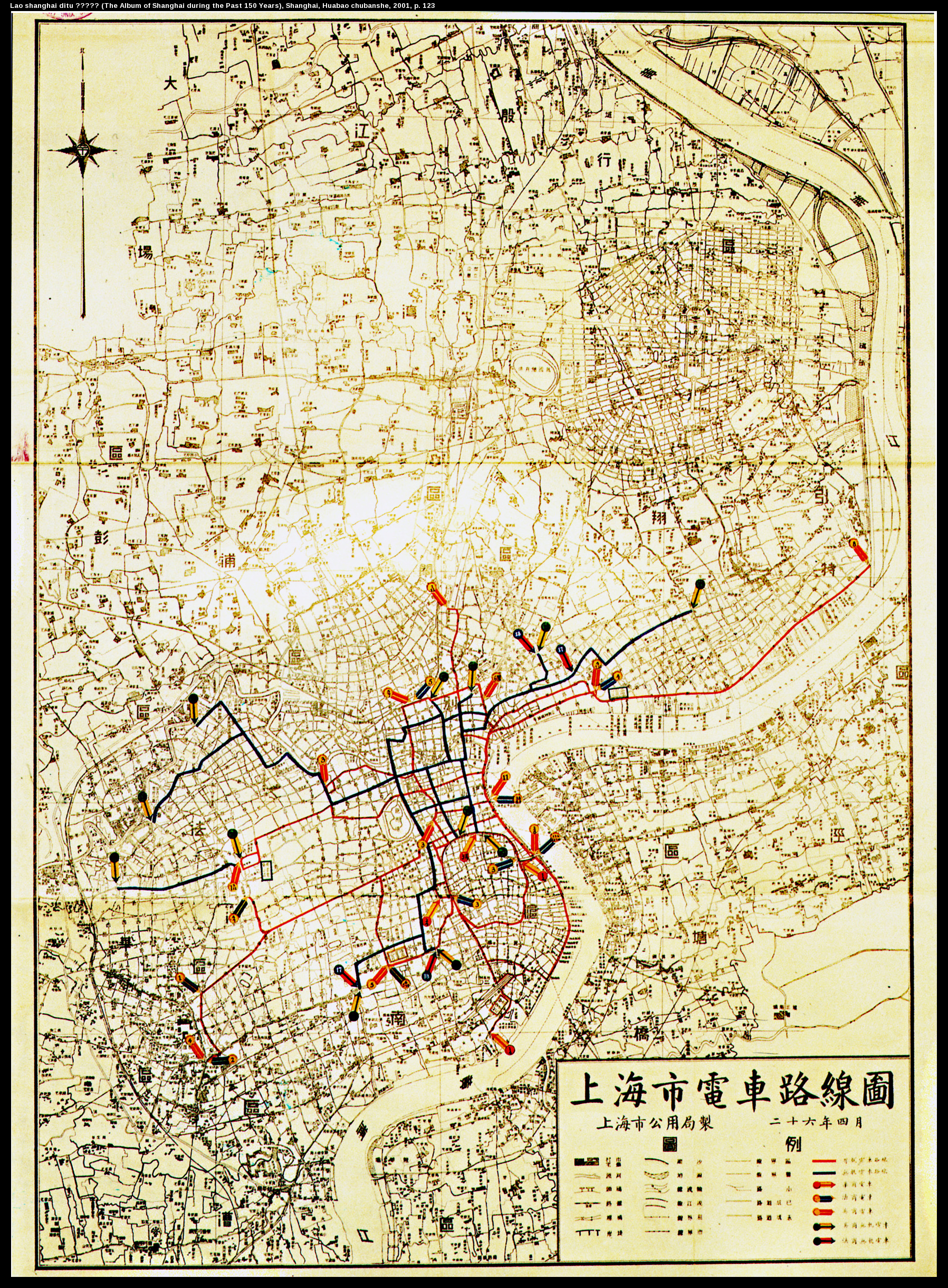
1937 Shanghai tram map with all three systems

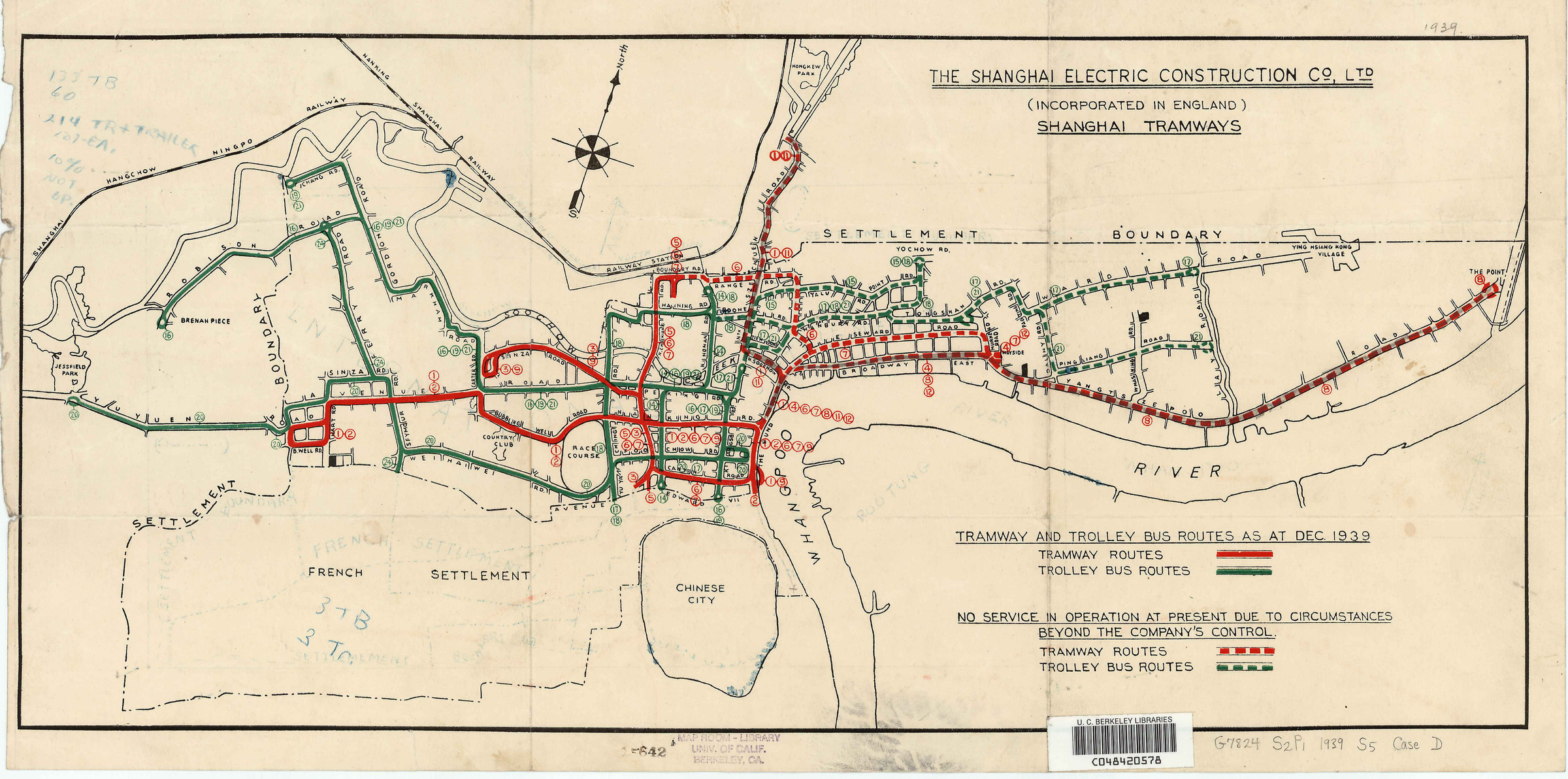
1939 tram map of the Shanghai International Settlement, showing disrupted routes

During the Japanese occupation of Shanghai in World War II in 1942, the British and French tram systems were placed under the control of the Japanese backed puppet state of the Reorganized Republic of China. During the occupation, some tram lines were demolished to support the Japanese war effort. After Japanese surrender in 1945, the tram systems were transferred back to original owners.

During the Korean War, anti-western sentiment and sanctions by the United States made it very difficult for the British and French to operate their respective systems. By 1952 and 1953, the British and French companies were shut down and the three tram systems were consolidated and turned over to local control as part of a mass campaigns of the Communist Party to expel foreign influence. Starting from the late-1960s, the number of buses, taxis and private cars increased rapidly, taking over more streetspace and causing traffic congestion. The congestion greatly affected the quality of tram services, and tram lines were gradually dismantled or converted into trolleybus lines. The last tram line, No. 3 (from Hongkou Park to Wujiaochang) was dismantled in 1975.

== Technology ==
Tramways ran on meter-gauge track with conventional overhead current collection.

On the British tramways, traditional four-wheel single-deck cars built by the Brush Electrical Engineering Company Limited in their Falcon Works at Loughborough, England were utilized. These trams were similar to the trams of London's Metropolitan Electric Tramways that were used for their Alexandra Palace line.

== See also ==
- List of tram and light rail transit systems
- Hong Kong tram
- Changchun Tram
- Dalian tram
- TEDA Modern Guided Rail Tram (rubber tired tram of Tianjin)
- Shanghai Metro
- Trolleybuses in Shanghai

Current operating tram systems in Shanghai:

- The rubber tired tram opened in Zhangjiang Hi-tech Park in 2010.
- The Songjiang Tram opened in late 2018.
