= Zhangjiang Tram =

Former tram network in Shanghai (2007–2023)

Chinese name
- Simplified Chinese: 上海张江有轨电车
- Traditional Chinese: 上海張江有軌電車
Transcriptions
Standard Mandarin
- Hanyu Pinyin: Zhāngjiāng yǒu guǐ diànchē
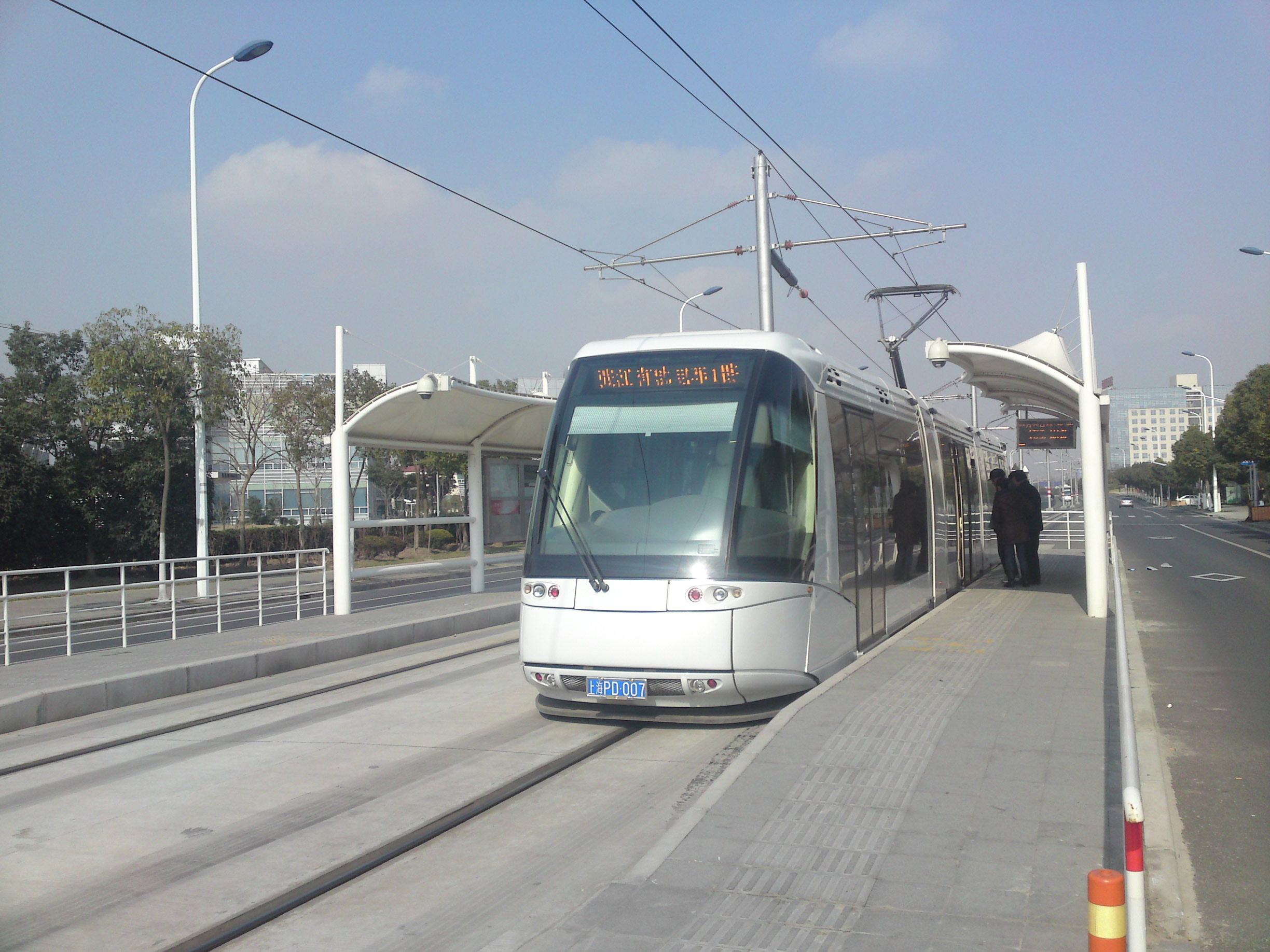

Overview
- Status: Closed
- Locale: Pudong, Shanghai
- Termini: Zhangjiang metro station; Zhangdong Road Jinqiu Road Station
- Connecting lines: 2
- Stations: 15

Service
- Type: Tram, Translohr
- System: Zhangjiang Tram
- Services: Zhangjiang metro station ↔ Zhangdong Road Jinqiu Road Station
- Operator(s): Shanghai Pudong Modern Rail Transportation Co., Ltd (up to April 1, 2021); Shanghai Pudong New Area Yanggao Public Transportation Co., Ltd. (from April 1, 2021)
- Depot(s): Heqing Town
- Rolling stock: 9 3-car Translohr Rubber-tyred trams
- Daily ridership: 6,000 (daily average, 2016)

History
- Commenced: December 23, 2007; 17 years ago
- Opened: December 31, 2009; 15 years ago
- Closed: June 1, 2023; 2 years ago

Technical
- Line length: 9.8 km (6 mi)
- Character: At-grade, unreserved tracks in the middle of the road
- Track gauge: None, central guide rail
- Electrification: Overhead lines (550 volts) DC
- Operating speed: max speed of vehicle: 70 km/h (43 mph) max operating speed: 40 km/h (25 mph)
Route map
To scale geographic map:
Part of a series on
Transport in Shanghai
- Roads
- Long Distance Rail
- Commuter Rail
- Maglev
- Metro
- Tram
- Trolleybus
- Bus
- Ferry
Long Distance
- Airports
  - SHA
  - PVG
- HSR
  - Huning
  - Jinghu
  - Coastal
  - Yangtze
  - Hukun
  - HuSuHu
  - HuSuTong
- Conventional Rail
  - Jinghu
  - Hukun
- Railway stations
  - Shanghai
  - Hongqiao
  - Shanghainan
  - Shanghaixi
  - Songjiang
Shanghai Suburban Railway
- Jinshan railway
- Airport Link line
Shanghai Metro
- 1 2 3 4 5 6 7 8 9 10 11 12
13 14 15 16 17 18 Pujiang
- Miscellanea
  - Trains
  - Stations
  - Timeline
Trams in Shanghai
- 1908-75
- Zhangjiang (Closed)
- Songjiang (T1
- T2)
Roads
- Municipal express roads
- Provincial expressways
- National expressways
- Yangtze River fixed crossing
Shanghai Public Transport Card

Zhangjiang Tram was a rubber-tyred tram line operating in Shanghai that utilised a Translohr system. Shanghai originally had a steel wheeled electric tramway network in its urban center. Routes expanded gradually and reached largest extent in 1925 with 328 tramcars; this tram system shut down in 1975. Tram service returned to Shanghai with the opening of a rubber tired Translohr line in the suburban Zhangjiang Hi-Tech Park in 2010. It is the second rubber-tired tram system in both China and Asia, the first being TEDA tram in Tianjin.

Zhangjiang Tram started construction on December 23, 2007. Construction was originally planned to be completed in December 2008, but this was delayed a year, until December 31, 2009 when it was opened to traffic. Passenger operations started on December 31, 2009. Zhangjiang Tram runs for 10 km (6.2 mi) from Zhangjiang Hi-Tech Park Station of the Shanghai Metro Line 2 to Heqing Town with 15 stops. The total investment of the Zhangjiang tram project is about 800 million yuan.

Zhangjiang tram was planned to be built in phases. Only the first phase was constructed and ran from Zhangjiang Hi-Tech Park Station on Shanghai Metro Line 2 (formerly Songtao Road Zuchongzhi Road Station) in the west, to Zhangdong Road Jinqiu Road Station in the east, which covers a distance of 9.8 km (6.1 mi), with a total of 15 stops, 1 depot. Initial plans included a next phase which is an extension to Tangzhen and a third phase to Heqing Town, reaching a scale of more than 30 kilometers (19 mi) by 2010. Due to successive years of losses, the Zhangjiang Tram originally planned extensions are temporarily put on hold. Zhangjiang Tram has an annual loss of more than 20 million yuan. This is because the passenger flow is unbalanced during the day (many office workers are passengers during the rush hour; when commute time is over, there are very few passengers), which is generally unsatisfactory; and the maintenance cost of vehicles is extremely high, as most parts are imported. For this reason, the supply of some parts has been stopped, making the vehicle unable to operate normally.

There were also possible plans to build tram projects in Lujiazui and Sanlin areas, which also have not been materialized.

Ultimately, although spare parts procurement was an issue, the system closed mainly due to the overwhelming saturation of the Zhangjiang area with other, faster rail transit systems, such as Line 2, 11, 13 and 16. After closure, the route was largely replaced by Pudong route 112 bus services. It was the second modern tram system in China to close, after the Zhuhai Tram in January 22, 2021.

== History ==
The new system was built in Zhangjiang Town, because it is a planned area, and commuting between neighborhoods of the town has always been difficult. The Translohr tramway is constructed in Zhangjiang Town which is in the heartland area of Pudong New Area (east shore of Huangpu River). Due to Economic-Technological Development Area ordinances, sound pollution must be kept to a minimum in this area. Traditional steel-wheeled trams generate much vibration and sound during their journey. Rubber tires on the trams reduce vibration, and as a result noise, substantially. Additionally, the Zhangjiang Town roads are very hilly, and rubber tired trams can more easily climb steeper grades than traditional trams. Another advantage is that rubber-tired trams don't require tracks, as steel wheeled cars do, so there is less disturbance of underground networks like power cables, phone lines, and sewer and water mains.

Timeline:

- 2007 – Construction of rubber tired tram started.
- 2009 – Test runs occurred.
- 2010 – Commercial services began.
- 2023 – Service closed.

== Practical Info ==
- Tickets: There was a single fare of 2 Yuan. It accepted the Shanghai Public Transport Card, the transfer discount policy for Shanghai public transport service was applicable.
- Total length: 9.8 km (6.1 mi).
- Opened: December 31, 2009.
- Operating hours: 5:45 am to 11 pm.
- Frequency: 15 minutes (3 minutes before end of 2015).
- Operate on a "Request stop" mode. If a passenger requested a stop, a green light was illuminated and the doors opened at the next stop. If no stop was requested, the doors remained closed.
- The existing traffic light system in the area (24 intersections with traffic lights) was transformed into a tram signal priority system. (though not utilized)
- The maximum speed of the vehicles was 70 km/h (43 mph), but due to the lack of dedicated lanes separate from other road users, the speed was set at 40 km/h (25 mph).
- Alignment: on unreserved tracks and in the middle of the road. Because of the rubber tires, it was not possible to lay track in grass, as the trams could only run on concrete or paved roads.

== Stations ==
The modern tram ran from Zhangjiang Hi-Tech Park Station to Zhangdong Road Jinqiu Road Station. Most stops had island platforms. Much of the route ran in the centre of a road, while the two terminals were situated on reserved area. Trams had been stored in an indoor facility at the eastern end of the line in Heqing Town. All stations were in the district of Pudong.

Routes	Station name		Connections	Distance km
M	English	Chinese	Connections	Distance km
●	Zhangjiang metro station	张江地铁站	2 (adjacent station - Zhangjiang Hi-Tech Park Station)	0.00
●	Bibo Road Gaoke Road Station	碧波路高科路站		
●	Huatuo Road Daerwen Road Station	华佗路达尔文路站		
●	Huatuo Road Keyuan Road Station	华佗路科苑路站		
●	Cailun Road Jinke Road Station	蔡伦路金科路站		
●	Cailun Road Halei Road Station	蔡伦路哈雷路站		
●	Gebaini Road Libing Road Station	哥白尼路李冰路站		
●	Ziwei Road Gaosi Road Station	紫薇路高斯路站		
●	Gaosi Road Zhangjiang Road Station	高斯路张江路站		
●	Zhangjiang Middle School Station	张江中学站		
●	Guanglan Road Zuchongzhi Road Station	广兰路祖冲之路站	2 (adjacent station - Guanglan Road)	
●	Guanglan Road Dangui Road Station	广兰路丹桂路站		
●	Dangui Road Qingtong Road Station	丹桂路青桐路站		
●	Dangui Road Zhangdong Road Station	丹桂路张东路站		
●	Zhangdong Road Jinqiu Road Station	张东路金秋路站		9.8

== Technology ==
=== Rolling stock ===
The rolling stock is Translohr. It consists of 9 multiple units (price of 30 million yuan each) of three cars each. They are low floor, fully air conditioned, and can operate at high speeds up to 70 km/h (43 mph). Each train is 25 meters (82 ft 0 in) long, 2.2 meters (7 ft 3 in) wide, and can take more than 160 people. Although it is generally composed of 3 cars, a train can be extended to 5 cars in the future, if demand is increasing. After the opening, there were 4 trains on the whole line, every 6 minutes or so.

== See also ==
- Trams in Shanghai – first generation tram network
- Songjiang Tram - steel wheel tram in Shanghai
- List of rubber-tyred tram systems
- Guided bus
- Trolleybuses in Shanghai
- List of tram and light rail transit systems
