= Songjiang Sports Center station =

Shanghai Metro station

Songjiang Sports Center 松江体育中心
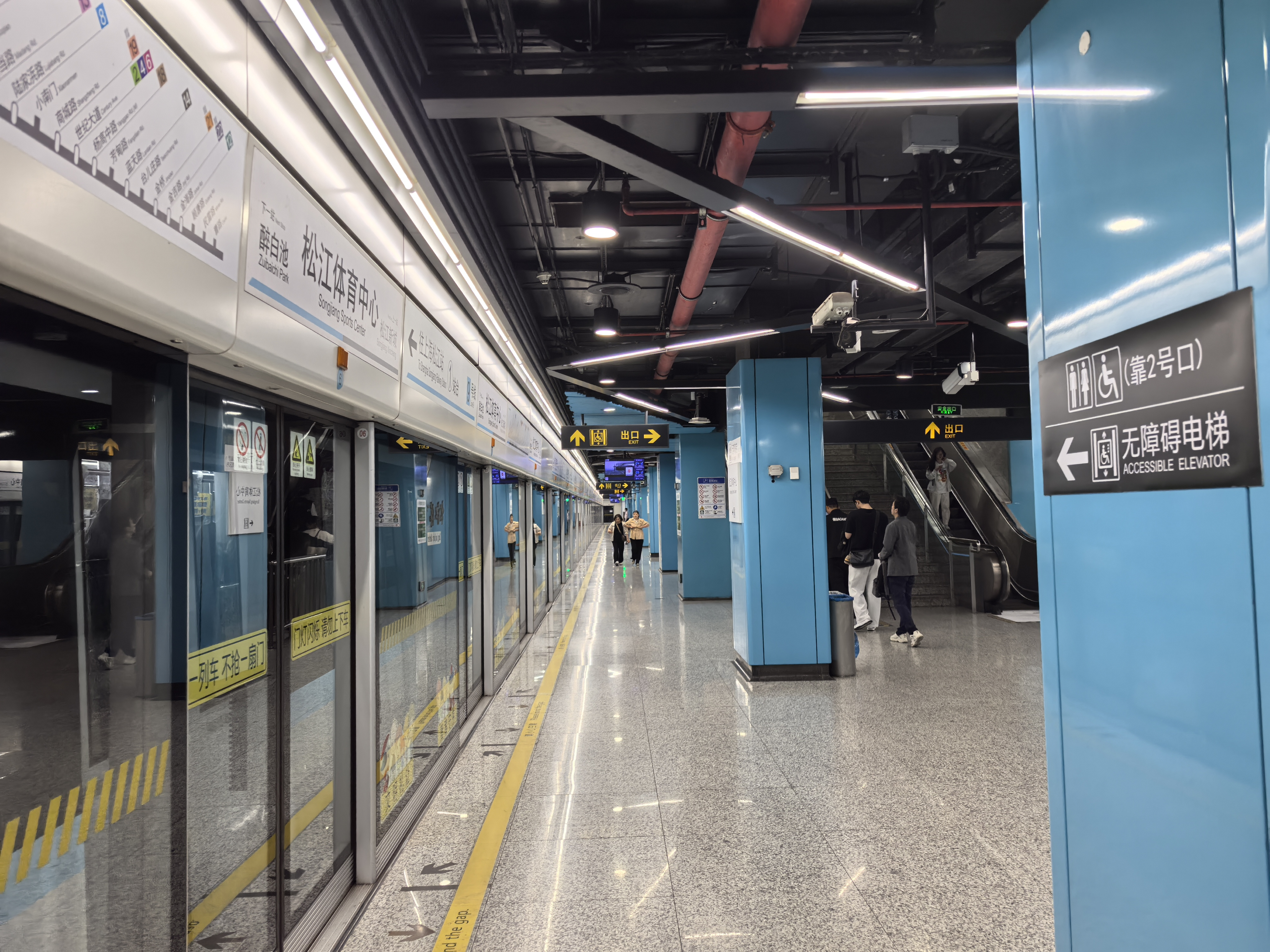
- Station platform

General information
- Location: Shanghai; China
- Coordinates: 31.015°N 121.230°E
- Operator: Shanghai No. 1 Metro Operation Co. Ltd.
- Line: Line 9
- Platforms: 2 (1 island platform)
- Tracks: 2
- Connections: T1 T2

Construction
- Structure type: Underground
- Accessible: Yes

History
- Opened: 30 December 2012

Services
Preceding station	Shanghai Metro	Following station
Zuibaichi Park towards Shanghai Songjiang Railway Station	Line 9	Songjiang Xincheng towards Caolu
Location
- Location within Shanghai

Songjiang Sports Center (simplified Chinese: 松江体育中心; traditional Chinese: 松江體育中心; pinyin: Sōngjiāng Tǐyù Zhōngxīn) is a station on Line 9 of the Shanghai Metro. The station is designed to serve the Songjiang Sports Center. It began operation on 30 December 2012.
