= Cosmo Lady =

Chinese underwear manufacturing company based in Dongguan, Guangdong

Cosmo Lady (China) Holdings Company Limited
- Simplified Chinese: 都市丽人（中国）控股有限公司
- Traditional Chinese: 都市麗人（中國）控股有限公司
Transcriptions
Standard Mandarin
- Hanyu Pinyin: Dūshì Lìrén (Zhōngguó) Kònggǔ Yǒuxiàngōngsī
Yue: Cantonese
- Jyutping: dou1 si5 lai6 jan4 (zung1 gwok3) hung3 gu2 jau5 haan6 gung1 si1

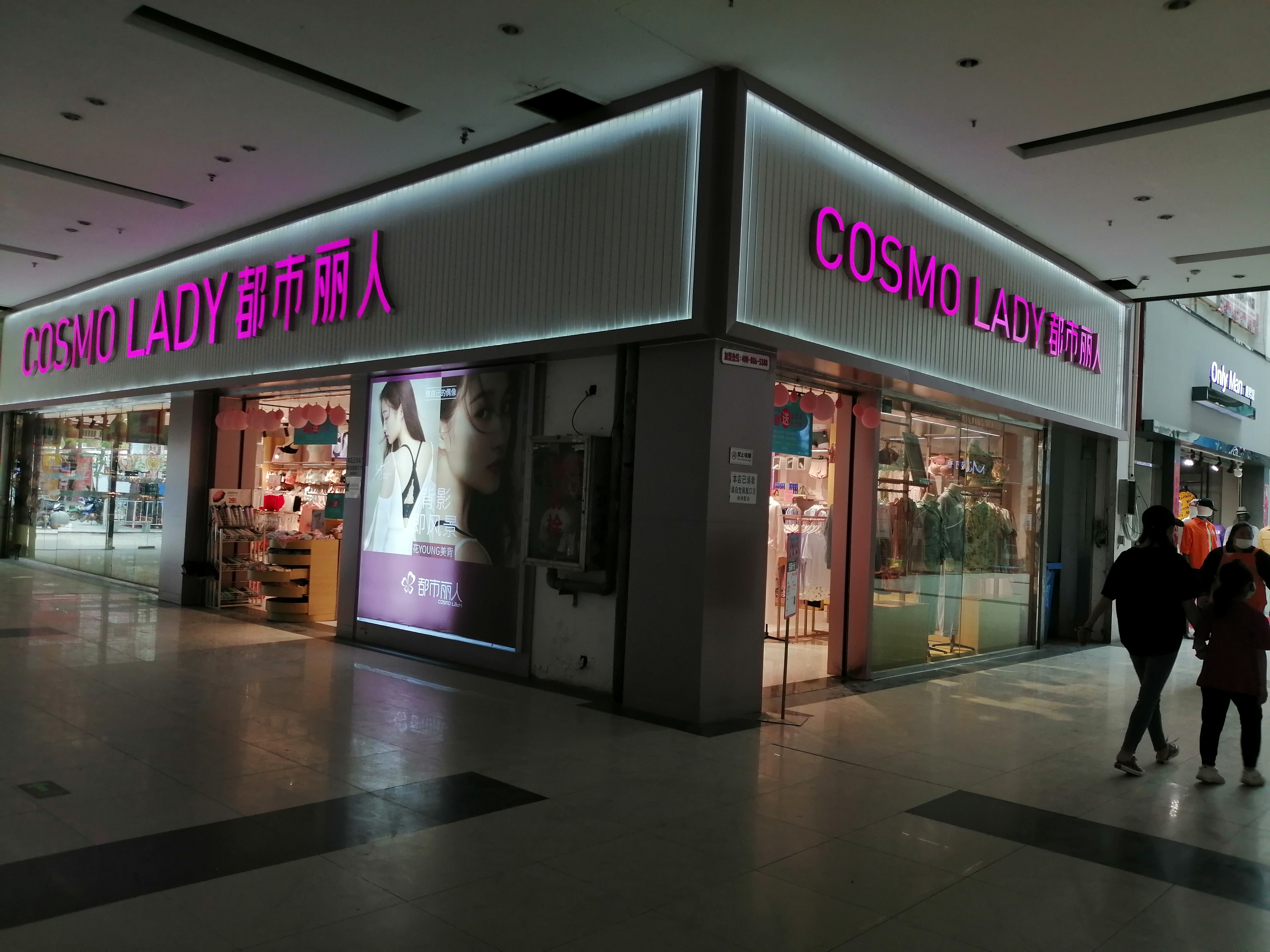
Shop in Suzhou

Cosmo Lady (China) Holdings Company Limited (HKSE: 2298), doing business as Cosmo Lady (simplified Chinese: 都市丽人; traditional Chinese: 都市麗人; pinyin: Dūshì Lìrén; Jyutping: dou1 si5 lai6 jan4; lit. 'City Beauty') is a Chinese company, headquartered in Dongguan, that manufactures underwear. As of 2019, it is the largest such company in the country. In 2014, it was the largest such company, if operating revenue is the method of measurement, with its own brand. It operates some retail shops selling its own products. As of 2014, Zheng Yaonan (郑耀南; 鄭耀南) is the chairperson.

== History ==
The brand was established in 1998 and the current corporation was established in 2009.

Historically the company sold only women's underwear. In 2014 the company had considered steps to also begin selling such products for male consumers. That year it made an initial public offering and effective 26 June 2014 was listed on the main board of the Hong Kong Stock Exchange (HKSE).

In 2019 there was an expected loss of 140 million USD, and possible plans to close retail stores.

== Corporate affairs ==
Its head office, the City Beauty Industrial Park (都市丽人工业园; 都市麗人工業園), is in Fengdeling Village (凤德岭村; 鳳德嶺村; Fèngdélǐngcūn; fung6 dak1 ling5 cyun1), Fenggang Town, Dongnan District, Dongguan. It moved to its current headquarters in 2010.

== See also ==
- Threegun - Chinese clothing manufacturer based in Shanghai
