= Xinqiao, Zhangjiajie =

Xinqiao 新桥镇
- Town
- Interactive map of Xinqiao
- Coordinates: 29°11′25″N 110°30′19″E
- Country: People's Republic of China
- Province: Hunan
- Prefecture-level city: Zhangjiajie
- District: Yongding
- Village-level divisions: 2 residential communities 9 villages
- Elevation: 262 m (860 ft)
- Time zone: UTC+8 (China Standard)
- Area code: 0744

Xinqiao (simplified Chinese: 新桥; traditional Chinese: 新橋; pinyin: Xīnqiáo; lit. 'new bridge') is a town in Yongding District, Zhangjiajie, Hunan, People's Republic of China, located 6.7 kilometres (4.2 mi) northeast of downtown Zhangjiajie. As of 2011, it has two residential communities (居委会) and nine villages under its administration.

== See also ==
- List of township-level divisions of Hunan
