= Zhangjiang Town =

Industrial town outside of Shanghai, China

Coordinates: 31.205°N 121.614°E

Zhangjiang Town (simplified Chinese: 张江镇; traditional Chinese: 張江鎮) is a town located in the Pudong District of Shanghai, China. The town hosts an industrial park for high technology companies.

== See also ==
- Zhangjiang Hi-Tech Park
