= Xinqiao, Zigong =

Xinqiao 新桥镇
- Town
- Location in Sichuan
- Coordinates: 29°19′30″N 104°14′23″E
- Country: People's Republic of China
- Province: Sichuan
- Prefecture-level city: Zigong
- County: Rong
- Elevation: 333 m (1,093 ft)
- Time zone: UTC+8 (China Standard)

Xinqiao (simplified Chinese: 新桥; traditional Chinese: 新橋; pinyin: Xīnqiáo; lit. 'new bridge') is a town of Rong County in southeastern Sichuan province, China, located 22 kilometres (14 mi) southwest of the county seat and roughly equidistant from Leshan to the northwest and Zigong to the east. As of 2011, it has one residential community (社区) and 8 villages under its administration.

== See also ==
- List of township-level divisions of Sichuan
