= Zuibaichi =

Garden in Shanghai, China

- 醉白池
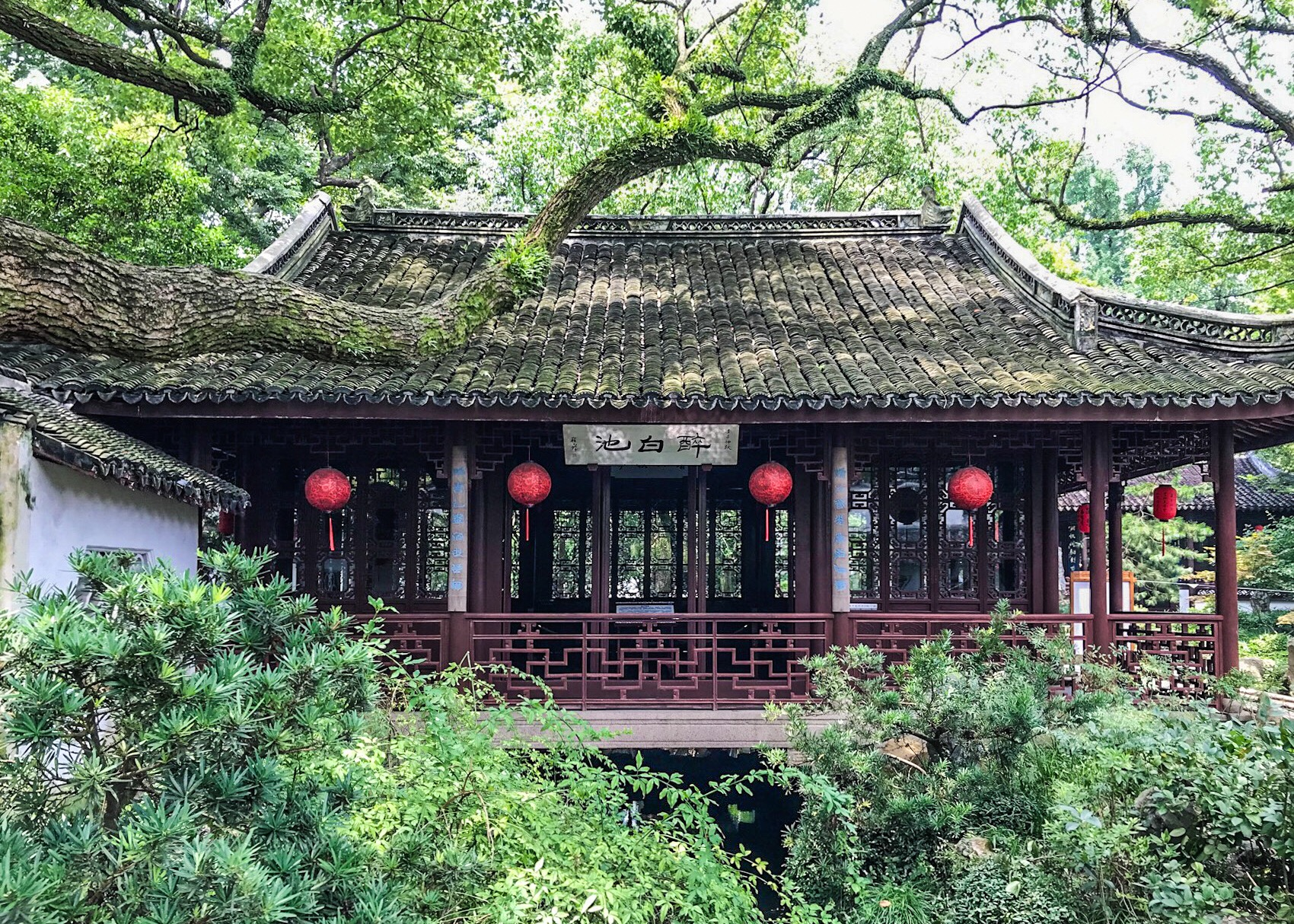
- Interactive map of Zuibaichi
- Type: Urban park
- Location: Songjiang District, Shanghai, China
- Coordinates: 31.0024°N 121.2292°E
- Created: In the Song Dynasty
- Status: Open all year

Zuibaichi
- Chinese: 醉白池
- Literal meaning: 'Druken Bai Pond'
Transcriptions
Standard Mandarin
- Hanyu Pinyin: Zuìbáichí
- Wade–Giles: Tsui^{4}-pai^{2}-ch‘ih^{2}
- IPA: [tswêɪ.pǎɪ.ʈʂʰɨ̌]
Wu
- Romanization: Tsoe^{5}-baq^{8}-zy^{6}
Yue: Cantonese
- Yale Romanization: Jeuibaahkchìh
- Jyutping: zeoi3 baak6 ci4
- IPA: [tsɵɥ˧.pak̚˨.tsʰi˩]
Southern Min
- Hokkien POJ: Chùi-pe̍h-tî
- Tâi-lô: Tsuì-pe̍h-tî

Zuibaichi (Chinese: 醉白池; lit. 'Drunken Bai Pond') is a Chinese garden in Shanghai's suburban Songjiang District that dates back to the Song Dynasty. It occupies an area of 5 hectares and is one of the five ancient Chinese gardens in Shanghai, along the Guyi Garden, the Yu Garden, the Garden of Autumn Vapors, and the Garden of Zigzag Stream.

== History ==
The garden was first set up as the private villa of Zhu Zhichun, a Jinshi selected from Imperial examination. Its size was rarely enlarged for hundreds of years until Dong Qichang, a Chinese painter, calligrapher of the later period of the Ming Dynasty, built several more ancient architectural complex on its original basis. In 1797, the garden began to be used as a foundling hospital until it was well repaired and reopened to the public in 1959.

The garden's name lies in the famous Chinese poet Li Bai. It is said that if Li Bai was brought back to life and had a sightseeing here, he would certainly lingered on and forgot to return, just about drunk. Actually famous men of letters usually gathered together, making various poems on the fantastic landscape.

== Scenery ==
A stone arch bridge

Drunken Bai Garden is a Chinese traditional garden based on architecture in Suzhou: traditionally decorated pavilions, winding and zigzagging paves, carved beams and painted rafters.

The garden contains a large variety of seasonal flowering plants, including lotus flowers that are in bloom in summer. To the north of the pond stands an ancient cinnamon tree which is over 300 years old.

=== Features ===
- Ancient Long Gallery
- Crane Pavilion
- Stone Sculpture
- Xuehai Hall

Sun Yat-sen allegedly held a speech in Xuehai Hall on December 27, 1912, during an inspection visit he undertook to Songjiang together with Chen Qimei and Dai Jitao. In this speech Sun addressed the further development of the newly founded Republic of China, the problems left over by the Xinhai Revolution, and the education system. After finishing the address, Sun took a group photo with members of the Tongmenghui inside of the hall.

== See also ==
- Chinese Garden
- List of Chinese gardens
