= Songjiang Tram =

Chinese name
- Simplified Chinese: 松江有轨电车
- Traditional Chinese: 松江有軌電車
Transcriptions
Standard Mandarin
- Hanyu Pinyin: Sōngjiāng yǒu guǐ diànchē
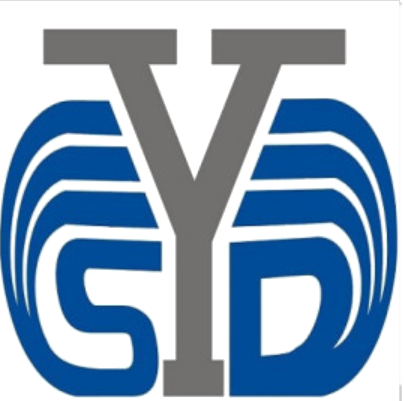

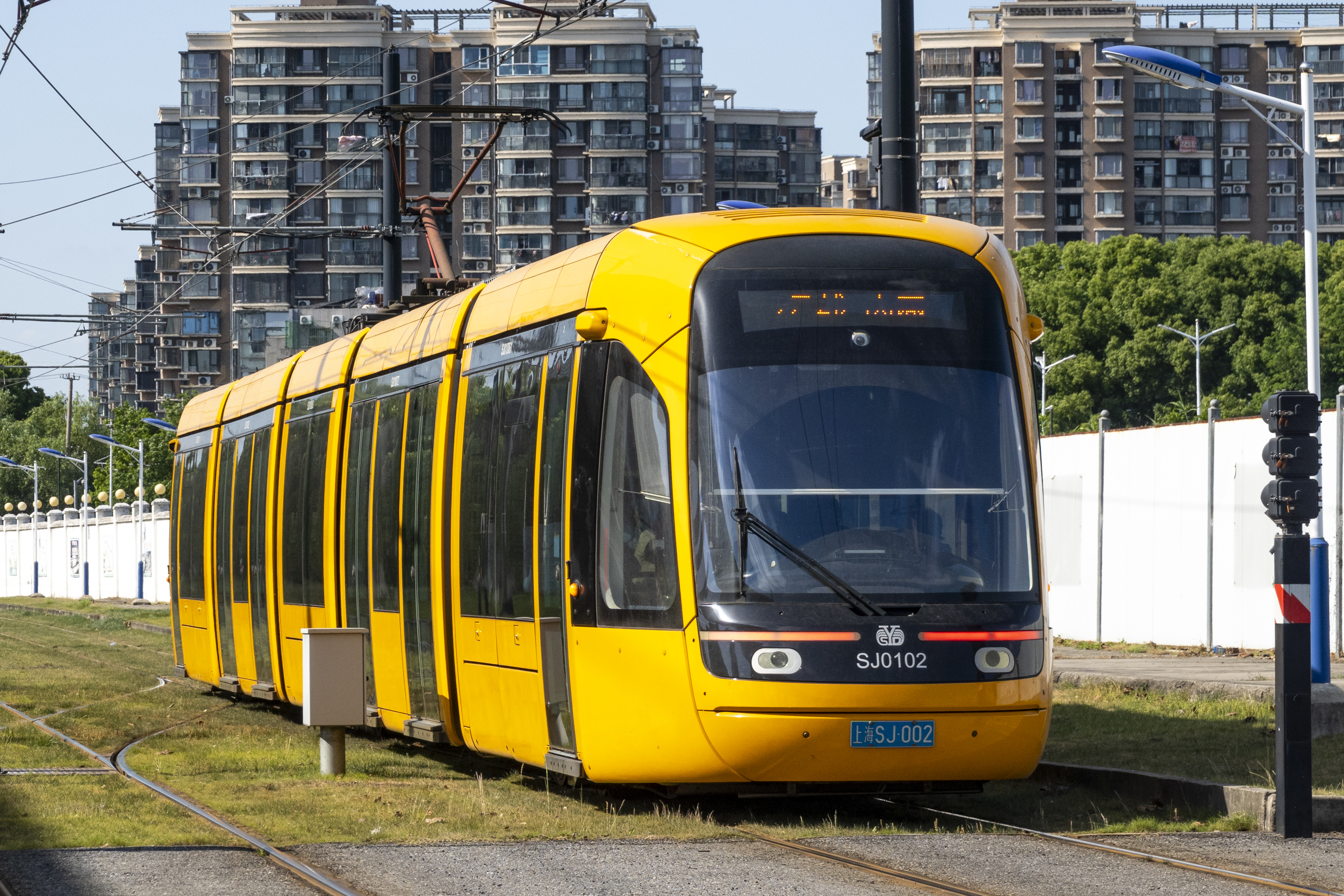
- Alstom Citadis 302 tram leaving Songjiang University Town station in May 2026

Overview
- Status: Operational
- Owner: Shanghai Shentong Metro Group (51%) and Keolis (49%)
- Locale: Songjiang District, Shanghai
- Termini: T1: Changhua Road; T1: Xinqiao
- Stations: 42

Service
- Type: Light rail
- Services: T1: Changhua Road ↔ Xinqiao; T2: loop line starting at Songjiang Sports Center
- Operator(s): CRRC Smart Transport Operation & Administrative Co., Ltd.
- Depot(s): Chenta Road Depot (辰塔路车辆段); Songjiang University Town parking lot (大学城停车场); Xinqiao Parking Lot(新桥停车场)
- Rolling stock: 30 Alstom Citadis 302 trams (length: 33m, width: 2.65m, 6 doors on both sides, 300 passengers)
- Daily ridership: 38,462 (December 31, 2019, peak); 35,000 (daily average); 170,000 (forecast)

History
- Opened: December 26, 2018; 7 years ago

Technical
- Line length: 39.39 km (24 mi)
- Character: At-grade
- Track gauge: 1,435 mm (4 ft 8 1/2 in)
- Electrification: 750 V DC overhead catenary
- Operating speed: 70 km/h (43 mph)
Route map
Network Map of Songjiang Tram:
Part of a series on
Transport in Shanghai
- Roads
- Long Distance Rail
- Commuter Rail
- Maglev
- Metro
- Tram
- Trolleybus
- Bus
- Ferry
Long Distance
- Airports
  - SHA
  - PVG
- HSR
  - Huning
  - Jinghu
  - Coastal
  - Yangtze
  - Hukun
  - HuSuHu
  - HuSuTong
- Conventional Rail
  - Jinghu
  - Hukun
- Railway stations
  - Shanghai
  - Hongqiao
  - Shanghainan
  - Shanghaixi
  - Songjiang
Shanghai Suburban Railway
- Jinshan railway
- Airport Link line
Shanghai Metro
- 1 2 3 4 5 6 7 8 9 10 11 12
13 14 15 16 17 18 Pujiang
- Miscellanea
  - Trains
  - Stations
  - Timeline
Trams in Shanghai
- 1908-75
- Zhangjiang (Closed)
- Songjiang (T1
- T2)
Roads
- Municipal express roads
- Provincial expressways
- National expressways
- Yangtze River fixed crossing
Shanghai Public Transport Card

Songjiang Tram (also Songjiang Tramway) is a light rail tramway in Shanghai, China. The system consists of two lines (T1 and T2) totaling 31 km (19 mi) with 42 stations. Unlike the Zhangjiang Tram, Songjiang trams use centenary power supply and steel-wheeled rail systems. Most of the route follows independent rights of way. Intersections with other road users give priority to trams allowing for running speeds of 25–30 km/h. Trains run from 6:00 till 22:00. With further extension of the network public transport modal split in Songjiang is expected to increase from the current 23% to 40%.

The tram system is operated by 30 light rail vehicles (LRVs), while other 4 lines in development of line directions. Estimated ridership for the line is 170,000 passengers per day.

A joint venture between Shanghai Shentong Metro Group and Keolis' Chinese joint venture, Shanghai Keolis, with Shanghai Shentong Metro Group holding 51%, has been awarded a five-year contract to operate and maintain the line.

== Pricing schedule ==
The fee is 2 yuan within 10 kilometers (inclusive) with an extra 1 yuan charge for each additional 10 kilometers. Children under 1.3m in height travel for free (accompanied by an adult).

Each station of Songjiang Tram is equipped with an automatic ticket vending machine. Shanghai Public Transport Card (physical card and mobile phone transportation card) can enjoy preferential transfers. The transfer discount policy for Shanghai public transport service is applicable, where when transferring to bus, subways or trams within 2 hours, the price is reduced by 1 yuan.

Since June 30, 2023, beside Shanghai Public Transportation Card, QR codes (WeChat, Alipay, etc.) and Transportation Union Cards from other regions are also supported in Songjiang Tram.

== History ==
=== Opening timeline ===
Segment	Date opened	Length	Station(s)	Name
T2 Zhongchen Road - Canghua Road	26 December 2018	13.933 km (8.66 mi)	20	Line 2 Phase I
T1 Canghua Road - Xinmiaosan Road	10 August 2019	11.10 km (6.90 mi)	17	T1 Phase I
T2 Zhongchen Road - Jinxi Road	10 August 2019	2.495 km (1.55 mi)	6	T1 T2 co-line section
T1 Xinmiaosan Road - Xinqiao Railway Station	30 December 2019	3.88 km (2.41 mi)	5	T1 remaining section
T2 North Sanxin Road - Xiangkun	planned (start construction 2021)	7.4 km (4.60 mi)	8	T2 phase 2
T4 New Songjiang Road - Jingliu Road	planned (start construction middle section: 2022)	17.1 km (10.63 mi)	22	
T5 Dongjing - Xinmaoting Road	planned (short term)	16.2 km (10.07 mi)	21	
T5 East Sheshan - Sheshan	planned (short term)	2.8 km (1.74 mi)	2	Branch line
T3 Chedun - Yushu Road	planned (long term)	20.6 km (12.80 mi)		
T6 Dongjing - Qixin Road	planned (long term)	15.8 km (9.82 mi)		

Note: The first phase of Songjiang Tram T2 Line includes Songjiang Tram T5 Line Thames Town West Station-North Sanxin Road Station. After the completion of Songjiang Tram T5 Line, this section will be operated by Songjiang Tram T5 Line.

The first 13.9 km (8.6 mi) section of the system, with 20 stations, opened on 26 December 2018.

A 12.864 km (8.0 mi) section (including the remaining section of T2, and part of T1) opened on 10 August 2019.

The remaining section of T1 (from Xinqiao Railway Station to Xinmiaosan Road) opened on 30 December 2019. The section is 3.881 km (2.4 mi) in length.

In 2020, the Songjiang tram T2 line construction project won the 2018-2019 Shanghai Municipal Engineering Gold Award.

The opening time of Chenta Road station on T1 is still unknown.

=== Passenger flow ===
- From December 26, 2018, to February 9, 2019, the total passenger flow of Songjiang tram T2 line reached 478,334, and the average daily passenger flow was 10,398.
- From December 26, 2018, to April 4, 2019, Songjiang tram T2 line transported a total of 1.084 million passengers, with an average daily passenger flow of 10,845, of which a single-day passenger flow reached 20,314 on December 31, 2018.
- From the opening of trial operation on December 26, 2018, to June 25, 2019, the total number of passengers carried was 2,108,687, the average daily passenger flow was 11,586, and the maximum passenger flow in a single day was 20,478.
- In 2021 the total passenger flow of the two lines is 9.1778 million; the average daily passenger flow of the two lines 25,100 passengers, and the highest passenger flow in a single day occurred on December 31, 2021, with 38,000 passengers.

== Stations ==
=== Songjiang Tram T1 ===
All stations are in Songjiang.

Songjiang Tram T1 service routes
M - Mainline: Canghua Road ↔ Xinqiao Railway station
Routes	Station name		T2	Connections	Distance km		Opening	Platform	Door opening
M	English	Chinese	T2	Connections	Distance km		Opening	Platform	Door opening
	Chenta Road	辰塔路					TBA	Symmetrical side	Right
●	Canghua Road	仓华路			0		10 Aug 2019	Symmetrical side	Left
●	North Sanxin Road	三新北路		T2	0.499		10 Aug 2019	Staggered side	Right
●	Canghui Road	仓汇路	●		0.635	1.134	10 Aug 2019	Staggered side	Right
●	Yushu Road	玉树路	●		0.567	1.701	10 Aug 2019	Symmetrical side	Right
●	Rongle Road North Xilin Road	荣乐路西林北路	●		0.978	2.679	10 Aug 2019	Island	Left
●	North Renmin Road	人民北路	●		0.606	3.285	10 Aug 2019	Symmetrical side	Right
●	Songjiang Sports Center	松江体育中心	●	9	0.345	3.630	10 Aug 2019	Island	Left
●	North Guyang Road	谷阳北路	●		0.560	4.190	10 Aug 2019	Island	Left
●	Rongle Road Tongbotang Road	荣乐路通波塘	●		0.389	4.578	10 Aug 2019	Symmetrical side	Right
●	North Fangta Road	方塔北路	●		0.752	5.330	10 Aug 2019	Symmetrical side	Right
●	Songdong Road	松东路	●		0.880	6.210	10 Aug 2019	Staggered side	Right
●	Songwei Highway	松卫公路	●		0.579	6.790	10 Aug 2019	Symmetrical side	Right
●	Baosheng Road	宝胜路	●		0.790	7.580	10 Aug 2019	Staggered side	Right
●	Dongxing Road	东兴路	●		0.571	8.151	10 Aug 2019	Staggered side	Right
●	Lianyang Road	联阳路	●		0.712	8.863	10 Aug 2019	Staggered side	Right
●	Jinxi Road	锦昔路		T2	0.686	9.549	10 Aug 2019	Staggered side	Right
●	Caonong Road	曹农路			0.590	10.139	10 Aug 2019	Staggered side	Right
●	Xinmiaosan Road	新庙三路			0.896	11.035	10 Aug 2019	Staggered side	Left
●	Caohe Road	漕河路			0.688	11.723	30 Dec 2019	Staggered side	Right
●	Xinche Highway	新车公路			0.686	12.419	30 Dec 2019	Symmetrical side	Right
●	Xinzhen Street	新镇街			0.696	13.115	30 Dec 2019	Symmetrical side	Right
●	Xinzhan Road	新站路			0.587	13.712	30 Dec 2019	Staggered side	Right
●	Xinqiao Railway station	新桥火车站		Jinshan	0.960	14.672	30 Dec 2019	Symmetrical side	Right

=== Songjiang Tram T2 ===
The current operating mileage is about 14.0 kilometers with 20 stations (excluding the common line section).

All stations are in Songjiang

Songjiang Tram T2 service routes
M - Mainline: Full loop
Routes	Station name		T1	Connections	Distance km		Opening	Platform	Door opening
M	English	Chinese	T1	Connections	Distance km		Opening	Platform	Door opening
— ↑ Loop line towards Songjiang University Town 9 ) (Inner Loop) ↑					0	-			
●	Guangfulin Road North Guyang Road	广富林路谷阳北路站			0.575	0.575	26 Dec 2018	Island	Left
●	Guangxing Road	光星路站			0.710	1.285	26 Dec 2018	Island	Left
●	Rongning Road	茸宁路站			0.653	1.938	26 Dec 2018	Symmetrical side	Right
●	Ronghui Road	茸惠路站			0.717	2.655	26 Dec 2018	Symmetrical side	Right
●	Zhongchen Road	中辰路站			1.440	4.095	10 Aug 2019	Staggered side	Right
●	Xutang Road	徐塘路站			0.886	4.981	10 Aug 2019	Staggered side	Left
●	Mingnan Road	明南路站			0.316	5.297	10 Aug 2019	Staggered side	Left
●	East Jiangtian Road	江田东路站			1.003	6.300	10 Aug 2019	Staggered side	Right
●	Jinxi Road	锦昔路站		T1	0.290	6.590	10 Aug 2019	Staggered side	Right
●	Lianyang Road	联阳路站	●		0.686	7.276	26 Dec 2018	Staggered side	Right
●	Dongxing Road	东兴路站	●		0.712	7.988	26 Dec 2018	Staggered side	Right
●	Baosheng Road	宝胜路站	●		0.571	8.559	26 Dec 2018	Staggered side	Right
●	Songwei Highway	松卫公路站	●		0.790	9.349	26 Dec 2018	Symmetrical side	Right
●	Songdong Road	松东路站	●		0.579	9.929	26 Dec 2018	Staggered side	Right
●	North Fangta Road	方塔北路站	●		0.880	10.809	26 Dec 2018	Symmetrical side	Right
●	Rongle Road Tongbotang Road	荣乐路通波塘站	●		0.752	11.561	26 Dec 2018	Symmetrical side	Right
●	North Guyang Road	谷阳北路站	●		0.389	11.949	26 Dec 2018	Island	Left
●	Songjiang Sports Center	松江体育中心站	●	9	0.560	12.509	26 Dec 2018	Island	Left
●	North Renmin Road	人民北路站	●		0.345	12.854	26 Dec 2018	Symmetrical side	Right
●	Rongle Road North Xilin Road	荣乐路西林北路站	●		0.606	13.460	26 Dec 2018		
●	Yushu Road	玉树路站	●		0.978	14.438	26 Dec 2018	Symmetrical side	Right
●	Canghui Road	仓汇路站	●		0.567	15.005	26 Dec 2018	Staggered side	Right
●	North Sixian Road	三新北路站		T1	0.635	15.640	26 Dec 2018	Staggered side	Left (Inner Loop) Right (Outer Loop)
●	Sixian Road	思贤路站			0.858	16.498	26 Dec 2018	Staggered side	Left
●	Wencheng Road	文诚路站			0.487	16.985	26 Dec 2018	Staggered side	Right
●	West Thames Town	泰晤士小镇西站			0.846	17.831	26 Dec 2018	Staggered side	Right
●	North Thames Town	泰晤士小镇北站			0.404	18.235	26 Dec 2018	Staggered side	Right
●	Longyuan Road	龙源路站			0.970	19.205	26 Dec 2018	Staggered side	Right
●	Jiangxue Road	江学路站			1.078	20.283	26 Dec 2018	Staggered side	Right
●	Xinsongjiang Road North Xilin Road	新松江路西林北路站			0.501	20.784	26 Dec 2018	Staggered side	Right
●	North Renmin Road Xinsongjiang Road	人民北路新松江路站			0.407	21.191	26 Dec 2018	Island	Left
●	Wenhui Road	文汇路站			1.163	22.354	26 Dec 2018	Island	Left
●	Mejiabang Road	梅家浜路站			0.488	22.842	26 Dec 2018	Island	Left
●	Guangfulin Road (Donghua University)	广富林路（东华大学）站			0.497	23.339	26 Dec 2018	Symmetrical side	Right
●	Longma Road	龙马路站			0.619	23.958	26 Dec 2018	Staggered side	Left
●	Songjiang University Town	松江大学城站		9	0.875	24.833	26 Dec 2018	Symmetrical side	Left (Inner Loop) Right (Outer Loop)
— ↓ Loop line towards Guangfulin Road North Guyang Road (Outer Loop) ↓ —					0.575	-			

== Future expansion ==
=== Under construction ===
The west extension of the T2 line started construction on 19 February 2021. It runs from Sanxin North Road to Xiangkun Road, with a total of 9 stations, with a total length of about 7.4 kilometers. The line runs along Xinsongjiang Road, Wensong Road, Dingsheng Road, and Wenxiang Road from east to west, with a total of Sanxin North Road Station, Chenta Road Station, Dingyuan Road Station, Dingsong Road Station, Dingwen Road Station, and Dingsheng Road. 9 stations including Lu Station, Hexi Street Station, Kunde Road Station and Xiangkun Road Station.

In order to meet the needs of line parking and operation management, it is proposed to set up a Xiaokunshan parking lot, located at the starting point of the western section of the second phase of the project, at the northwest corner of the Xiangkun intersection of Wenxiang Road, with a total land area of approximately 0.97 hectares. At the same time, in order to ensure the operation needs of the west extension of the T2 line, a total of 5 substations have been set up across the line, of which one civil substation is combined with a parking lot, and the other 4 are box-type substations.

=== Future plans ===
Eventually the plans call for 7 tram lines with a total length of about 150 km.

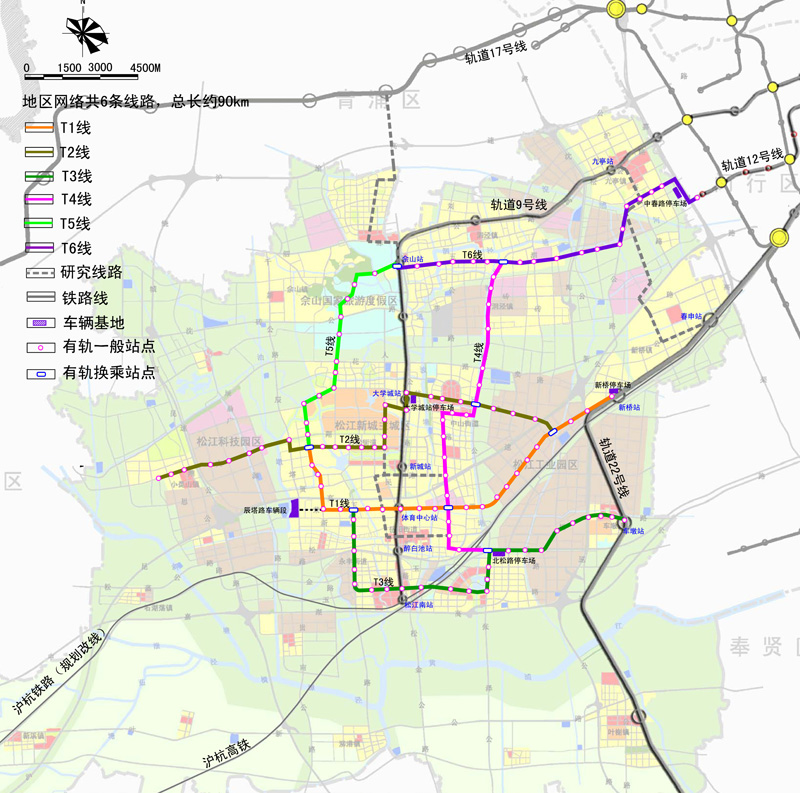
The long-term planning line announced in September 2013, the line planning is already old

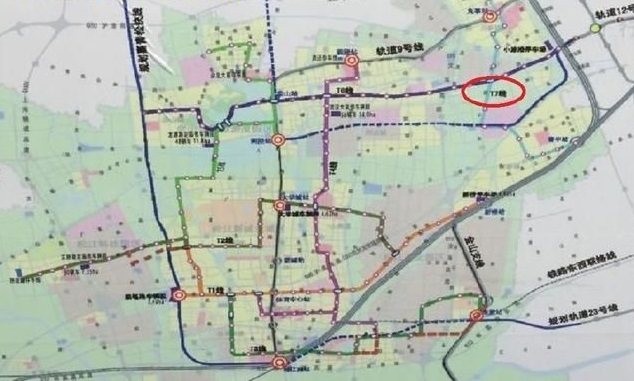
Songjiang tram future plans in 2018

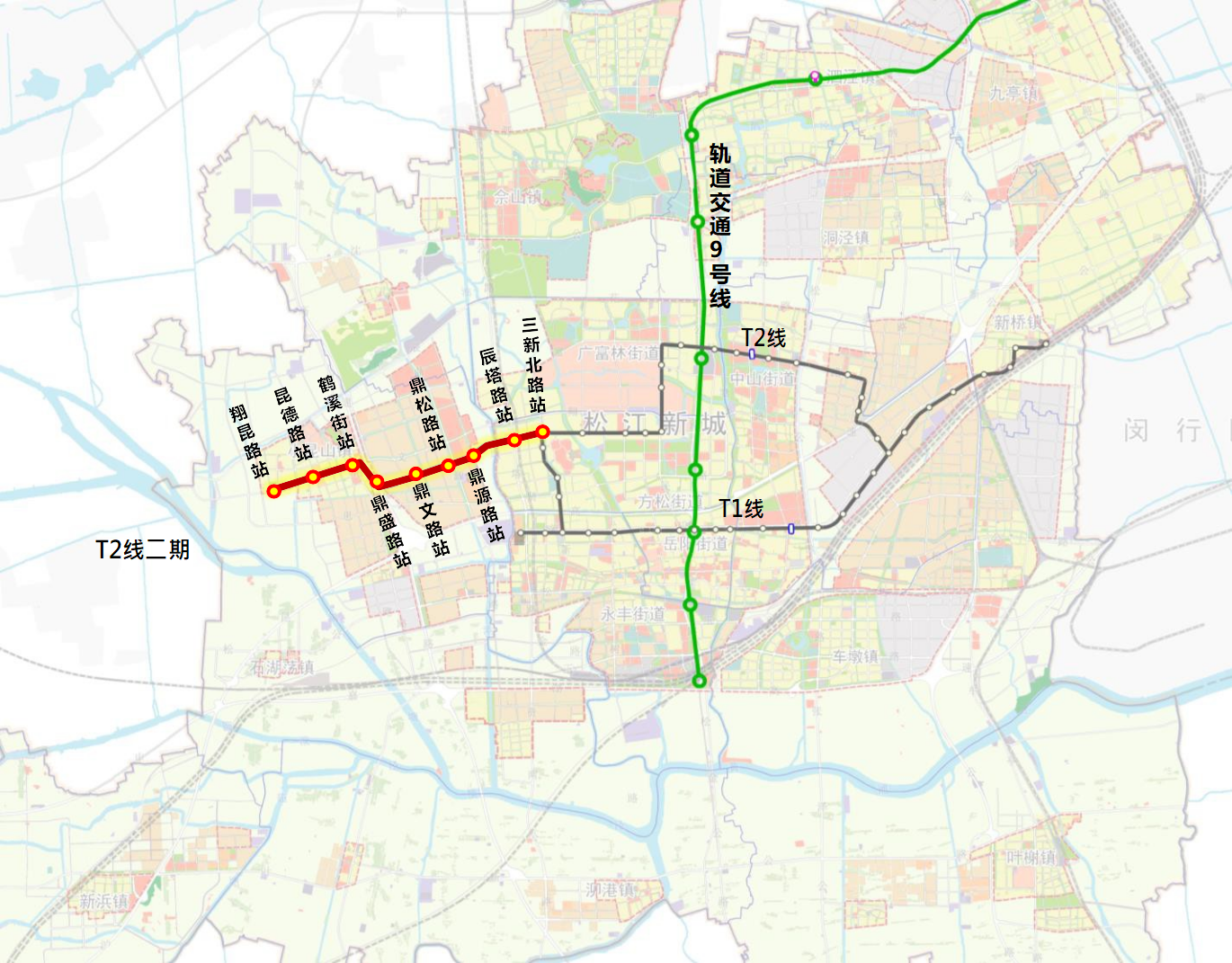
Songjiang tram under construction

== Technology ==
=== Depots and yards ===
- Chenta Road Depot is a depot for Line T1. It has inspection lines and temporary repair lines, and can also carry out work such as overhauls. Up to 77 trains can be stored.
- Xinqiao Yard is a stabling yard of Line T1, which can store 8 trains.
- Songjiang University Town Yard is a stabling yard of Line T2. It has inspection lines and temporary repair lines. It can also receive new cars, repaired cars, and complete overhauls. Up to 33 trains can be stored.

=== Rolling stock ===
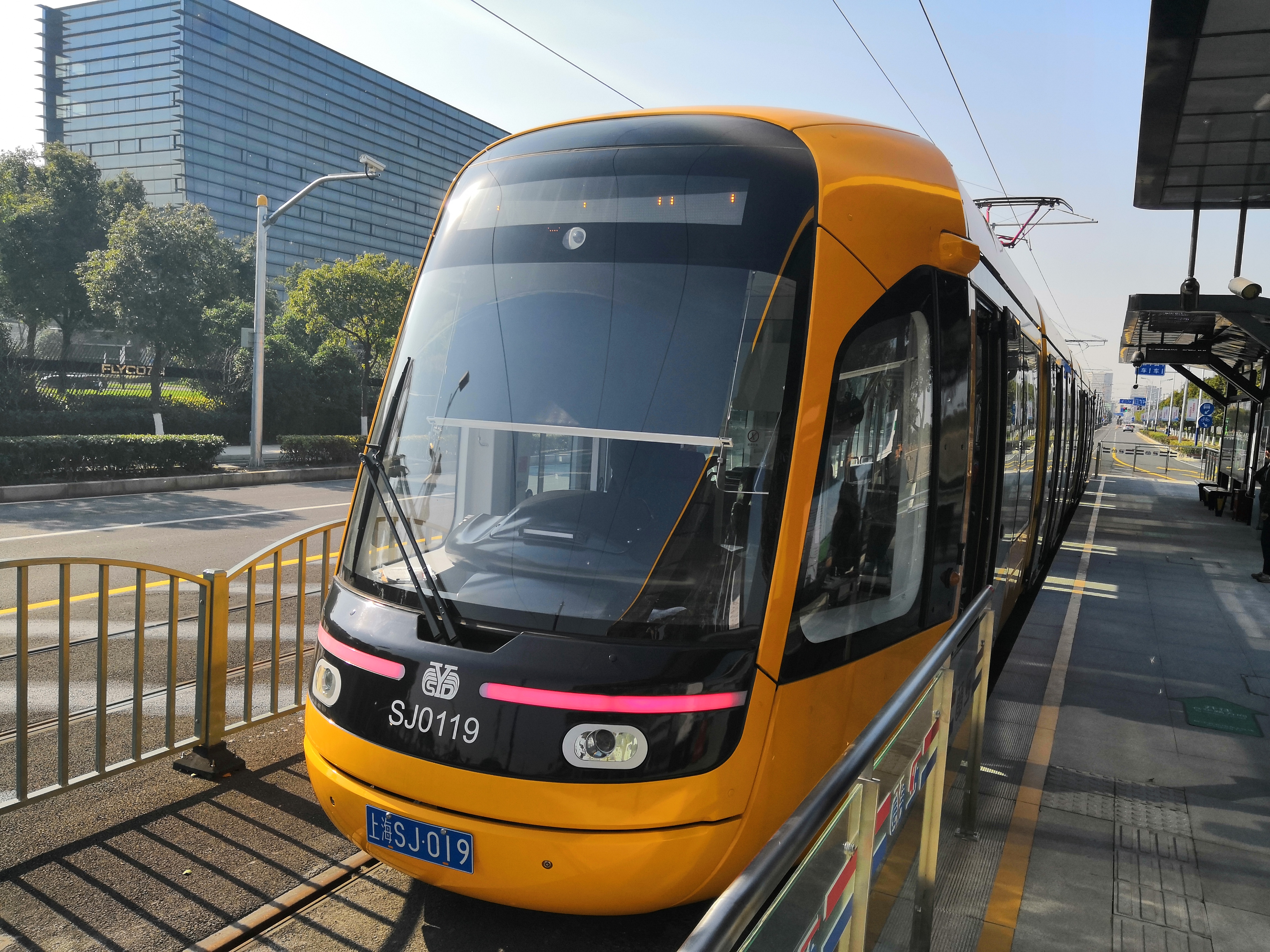
A Alstom Citadis 302 tram at Zhongchen Road station

A joint venture of Alstom and Shanghai Rail Traffic Equipment Development Company was awarded a €72 million contract in April 2015 to supply 30 Alstom Citadis 302 trams. The first Silkworm low-floor LRV was delivered on 21 November 2016. The trams can carry 300 passengers.

== See also ==
- Shanghai rail transit
- List of tram and light rail transit systems
