= Xinqiao, Zizhong County =

Xinqiao 新桥镇
- Town
- Location in Sichuan
- Coordinates: 29°43′57″N 104°44′01″E
- Country: People's Republic of China
- Province: Sichuan
- Prefecture-level city: Neijiang
- County: Zizhong
- Elevation: 455 m (1,493 ft)
- Time zone: UTC+8 (China Standard)

Xinqiao (simplified Chinese: 新桥; traditional Chinese: 新橋; pinyin: Xīnqiáo; lit. 'new bridge') is a town of Zizhong County in southeastern Sichuan province, China, located 12 kilometres (7.5 mi) west-southwest of the county seat and about 35 km (22 mi) northwest of downtown Neijiang. As of 2011, it has one residential community (社区) and 25 villages under its administration.

== See also ==
- List of township-level divisions of Sichuan
