= Fenggang, Dongguan =

Fenggang 凤岗镇
- Town
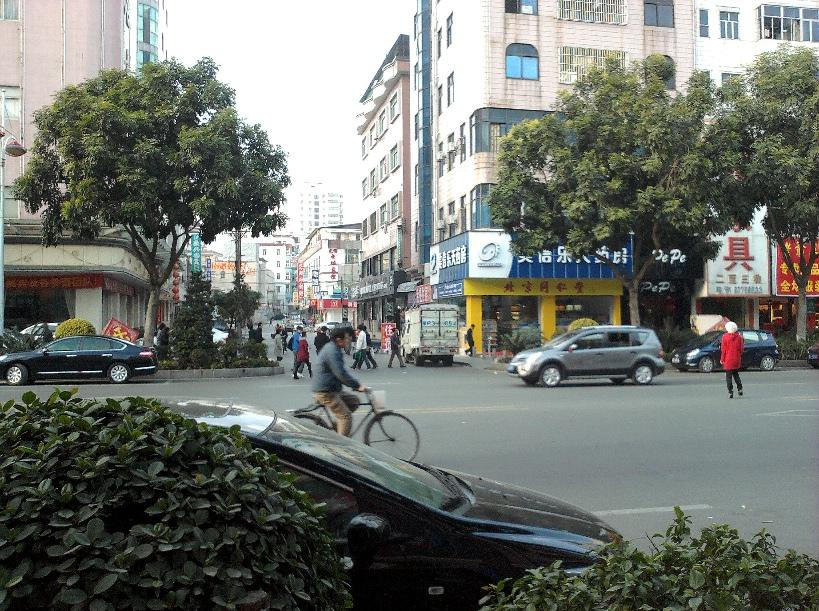
- Downtown Fenggang in 2010

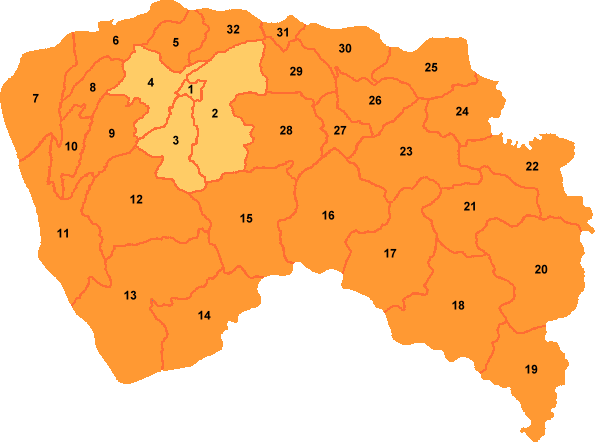
- Fenggang is labelled '19' on this map of Dongguan

- Location in Guangdong
- Coordinates: 22°44′49″N 114°08′13″E
- Country: People's Republic of China
- Province: Guangdong
- Prefecture-level city: Dongguan

Area
  - Total: 82.5 km^{2} (31.9 sq mi)

Population (2005)
  - Total: 20,633
  - Density: 250/km^{2} (648/sq mi)
- Time zone: UTC+8 (China Standard)
- Postal code: 523690
- Area code: 0769
- Website: www.fenggang.gov.cn

Fenggang, Dongguan
- Simplified Chinese: 凤岗镇
- Traditional Chinese: 鳳崗鎮
- Literal meaning: Phoenix Mound
Transcriptions
Standard Mandarin
- Hanyu Pinyin: Fènggǎng zhèn
- Bopomofo: ㄈㄥˋ ㄍㄤˇ ㄓㄣˋ
- Gwoyeu Romatzyh: Fenqgaang jenn
- Wade–Giles: Fêng4-kang3 chên4
- Tongyong Pinyin: Fènggǎng jhèn
- Yale Romanization: Fènggǎng jèn
- MPS2: Fènggǎng jèn
Yue: Cantonese
- Jyutping: fung6 gong1 zan3

Fenggang (simplified Chinese: 凤岗镇; traditional Chinese: 鳳崗鎮; pinyin: Fènggǎng zhèn; lit. 'phoenix mound') is a town under the jurisdiction of the prefecture-level city of Dongguan in Guangdong province, China.

== Location ==
Fenggang is located southeast of Dongguan City and south of the towns of Tangxia and Qingxi. It borders Huizhou's Huiyang District to the east and Shenzhen's Longgang District to the south. The total area of the town is 82.5 square kilometers.

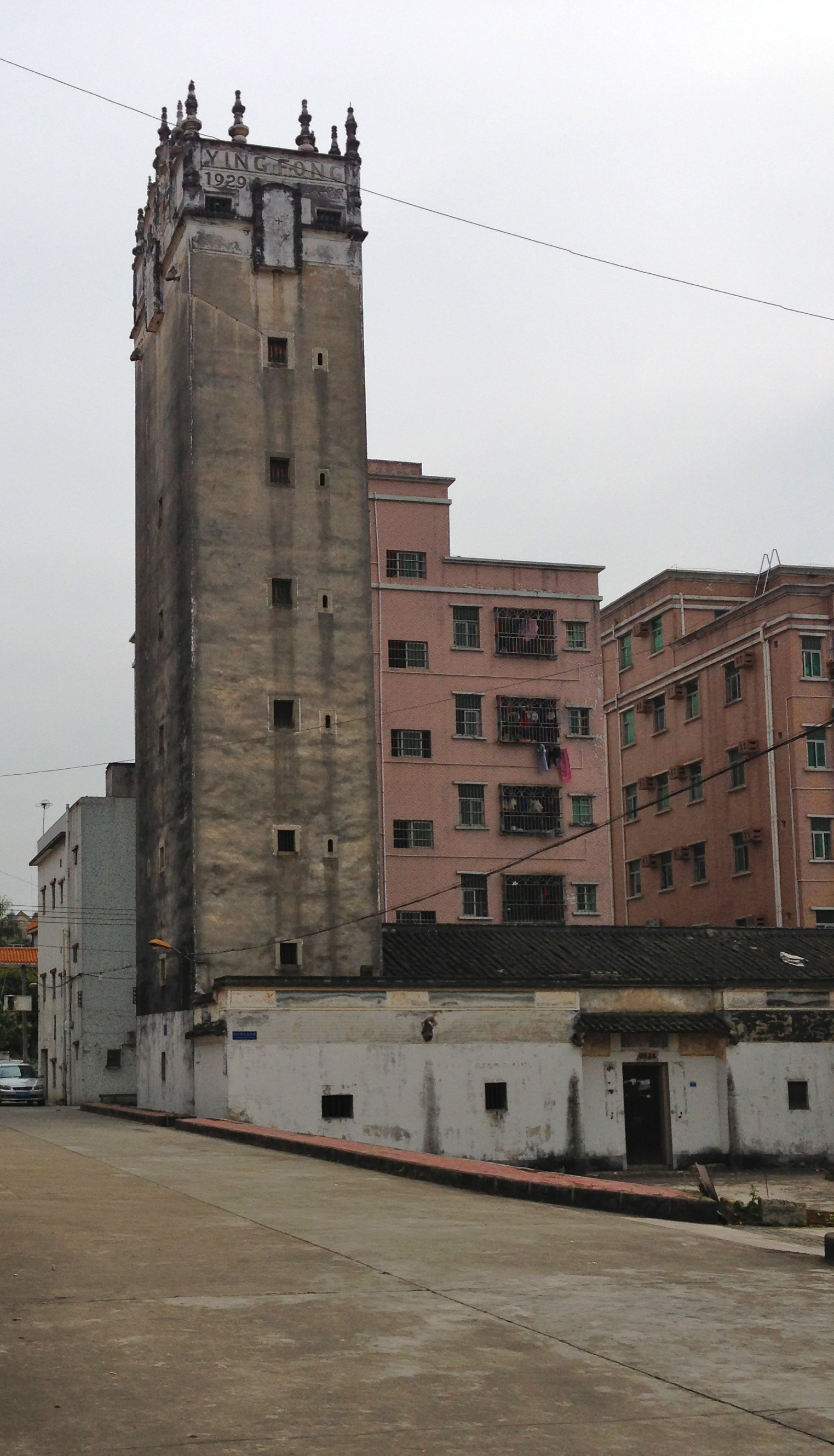
Yingfong Tower, built 1929

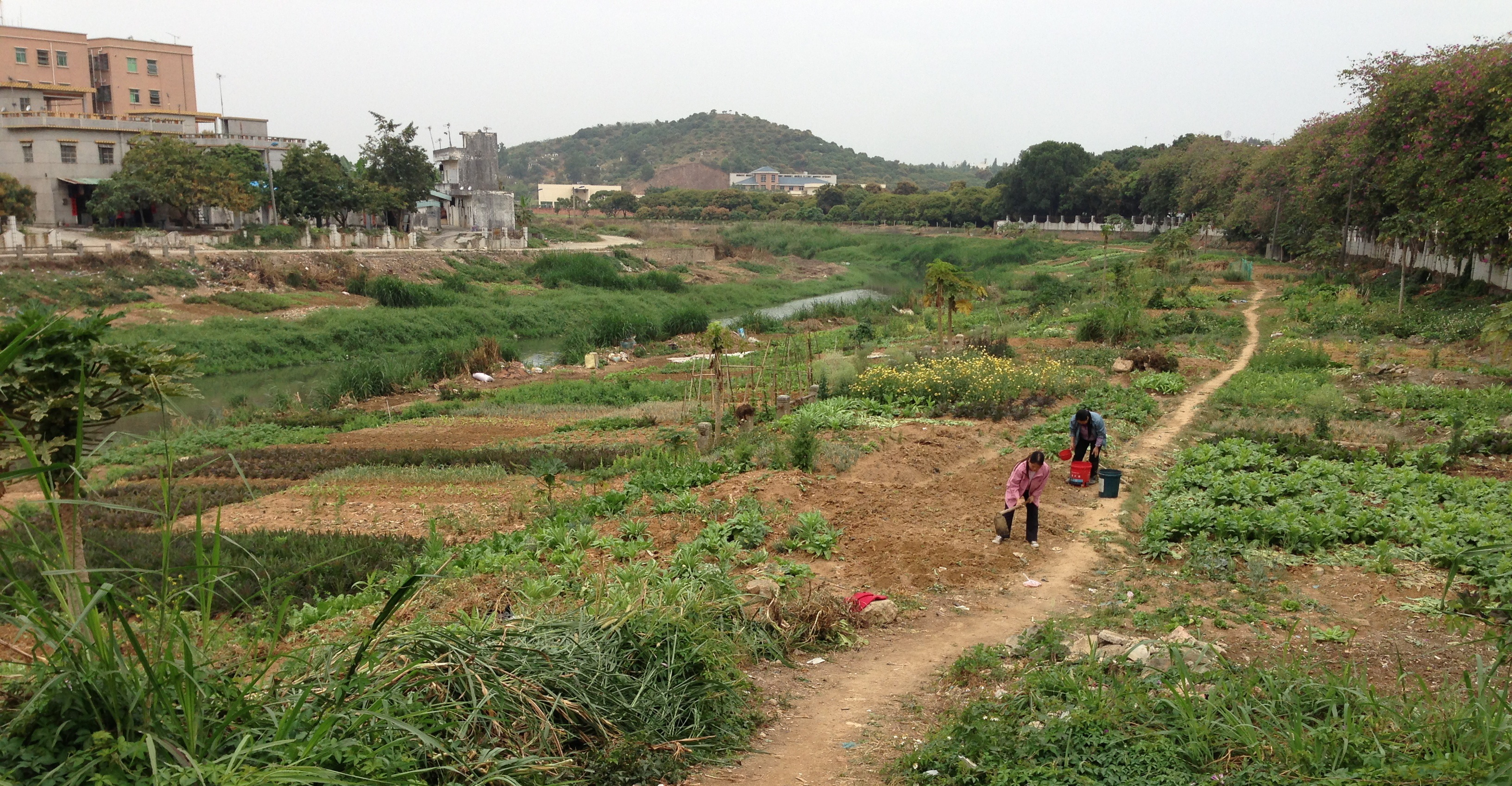
Farmers working plots along the river in Fenggang

== Population ==
The population is 64,715 people as of 2010, with 300,000 floating residents. In 2020, Fenggang Town had a resident population of 64,000 people; the majority of whom speak the Cantonese language.

== Economy ==
Underwear manufacturer Cosmo Lady's head office is in Fengdeling Village (凤德岭村; 鳳德嶺村; Fèngdélǐngcūn; fung6 dak1 ling5 cyun1), Fenggang.

Fenggang Town is also where one of AliExpress's Delivery Sorting Centers is located.
