= Xinqiao, Mianyang =

Xinqiao 新桥镇
- Town
- Location in Sichuan
- Coordinates: 31°33′15″N 104°48′44″E
- Country: People's Republic of China
- Province: Sichuan
- Prefecture-level city: Mianyang
- District: Youxian
- Elevation: 484 m (1,588 ft)
- Time zone: UTC+8 (China Standard)

Xinqiao (simplified Chinese: 新桥; traditional Chinese: 新橋; pinyin: Xīnqiáo; lit. 'new bridge') is a town of Youxian District, Mianyang, Sichuan, People's Republic of China, located 9 kilometres (5.6 mi) northeast of the main urban area of Mianyang. As of 2011, it has 2 residential communities (社区) and 12 villages under its administration.

== See also ==
- List of township-level divisions of Sichuan
