= Xinqiao, Suining =

Xinqiao 新桥镇
- Town
- Location in Sichuan
- Coordinates: 29°43′57″N 104°44′01″E
- Country: People's Republic of China
- Province: Sichuan
- Prefecture-level city: Suijiang
- District: Chuanshan
- Elevation: 299 m (981 ft)
- Time zone: UTC+8 (China Standard)
- Postal code: 629000

Xinqiao (simplified Chinese: 新桥; traditional Chinese: 新橋; pinyin: Xīnqiáo; lit. 'new bridge') is a town of Chuanshan District, in the northwestern outskirts of Suining, Sichuan, People's Republic of China. As of 2011, it has one residential community (社区) and 16 villages under its administration.

== See also ==
- List of township-level divisions of Sichuan
