= Xinqiao, Shanghai =

Xinqiao 新桥镇
- Town
- Location in Shanghai
- Coordinates: 31°03′50″N 121°18′35″E
- Country: People's Republic of China
- Municipality: Shanghai
- District: Songjiang
- Village-level divisions: 13 residential communities (社区)
- Elevation: 7 m (23 ft)
- Time zone: UTC+8 (China Standard)
- Postal code: 201612
- Area code: 0021

Xinqiao (simplified Chinese: 新桥; traditional Chinese: 新橋; pinyin: Xīnqiáo; Shanghainese: sin^{1}jiau^{1}; literally "new bridge") is a town of Songjiang District in the southwestern suburbs of Shanghai. As of 2011, it has 13 residential communities (社区) under its administration. It is served by Xinqiao railway station (新桥站), on the Jinshan railway, and located just east of the intersection of G15 Shenyang–Haikou Expressway and G60 Shanghai–Kunming Expressway.

== See also ==
- List of township-level divisions of Shanghai
