= Xinqiao railway station =

Railway station in Shanghai, China

Xinqiao 新桥站
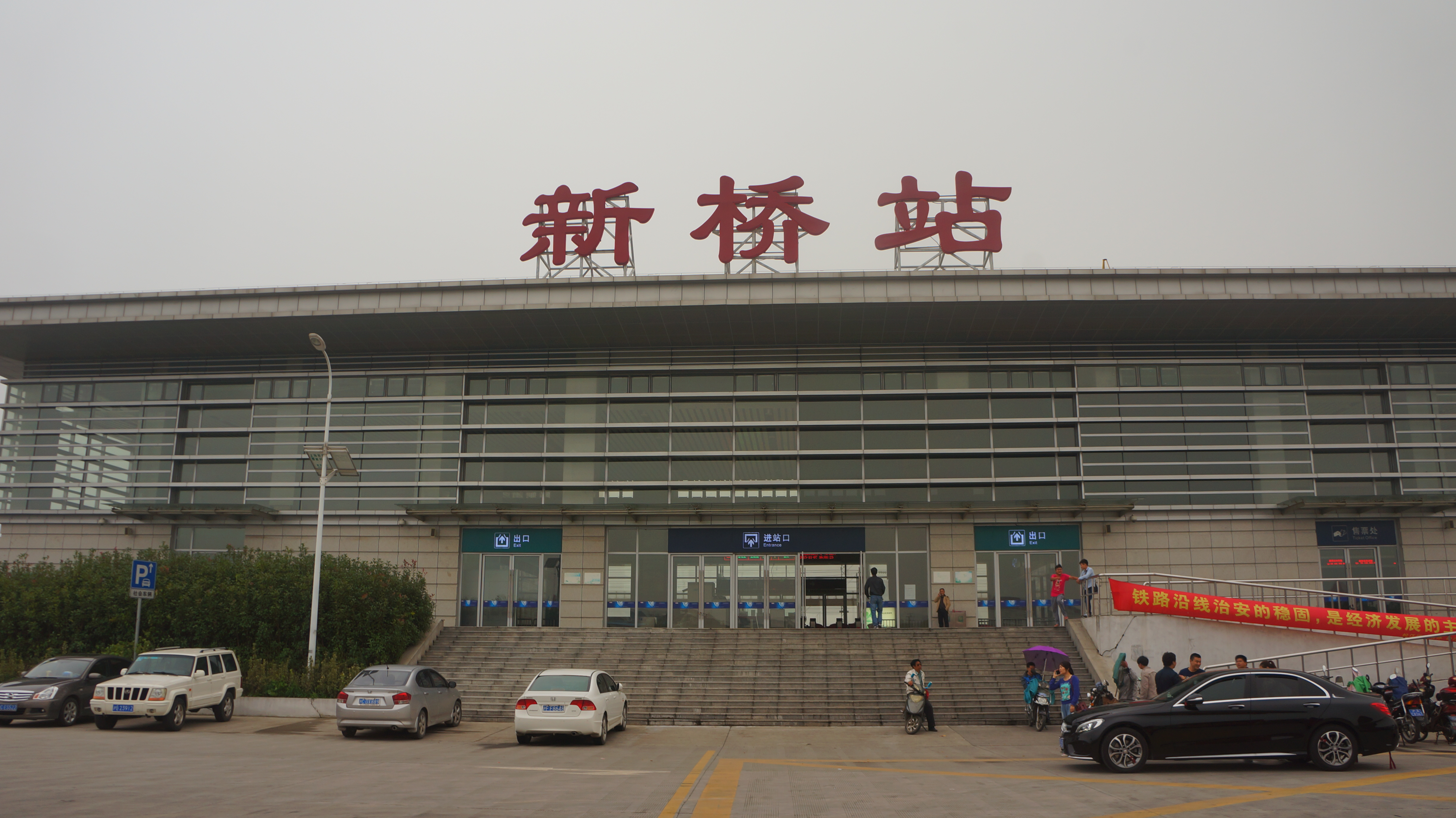
- Station exterior

Chinese name
- Simplified Chinese: 新桥站
- Traditional Chinese: 新橋站
Transcriptions
Standard Mandarin
- Hanyu Pinyin: Xīnqiáo Zhàn

General information
- Location: Songjiang District, Shanghai, China; China
- Coordinates: 31°03′41.1″N 121°19′08.6″E
- Lines: Shanghai–Kunming Railway; Jinshan Railway

History
- Opened: September 28, 2012

Services
Preceding station	China Railway	Following station
Chunshen towards Shanghai South	Jinshan railway	Chedun towards Jinshanwei
Location
- Location within Shanghai

Xinqiao railway station (simplified Chinese: 新桥站; traditional Chinese: 新橋站; pinyin: Xīnqiáo Zhàn) is a railway station on the Jinshan railway in Songjiang District, Shanghai. It opened for intercity passenger service on September 28, 2012. The station serves Xinqiao, Shanghai.

Since 10 August 2019, the station also serves as the eastern terminus of line T1 of the Songjiang Tram.
