= Ding Yanyong =

Chinese painter and art educator (1902–1978)

- 丁衍庸
- Born: 15 April 1902; Maoming, Guangdong, Qing China
- Died: 23 December 1978 (aged 76); Hong Kong
- Resting place: Cape Collinson Crematorium, Hong Kong
- Other names: Ting Yin Yung, Ting Yen-yung
- Education: Tokyo School of Fine Arts
- Known for: Ink wash painting, oil painting, seal carving
- Movement: New Art Movement

Ding Yanyong (Chinese: 丁衍庸; pinyin: Dīng Yǎnyōng; 15 April 1902 – 23 December 1978), also known as Ting Yin Yung, was a Chinese painter, seal carver and art educator. One of the first generation of Chinese artists to train in Western painting abroad, he is credited with helping introduce modernist European aesthetics to China, and later with turning back to the Chinese literati tradition in order to reconcile the two. Critics have called him the "Matisse of the East" and the "Modern Bada Shanren", after the two painters who most shaped his work. With fellow Guangdong artists Lin Fengmian and Guan Liang, he is sometimes grouped as one of the "Three Masters of Guangdong".

Ding trained at the Tokyo School of Fine Arts from 1921 to 1926 and returned to China to teach Western painting in Shanghai, Guangzhou and Chongqing, becoming a prominent figure in the New Art Movement of the 1920s and 1930s. From the late 1920s he began collecting and studying the work of Bada Shanren, Shitao and Jin Nong, and taught himself ink wash painting. He moved to Hong Kong in 1949, where he continued to paint and teach until his death. In 1957 he co-founded the fine arts programme at New Asia College, which became the Department of Fine Arts of the Chinese University of Hong Kong after the university's establishment in 1963.

== Early life and education ==
Ding was born on 15 April 1902 in Maopo Village, Xieji, Maoming County, Guangdong Province (present-day Gaozhou). Yanyong was his given name; he also used the style names Shudan and Jibo. Born in the year of the tiger, he frequently used the name "Ding Hu" on his seals, and students and friends in Hong Kong addressed him as "Ding Gong". His name in English is given as Ting Yin Yung and is also romanised as Ting Yen-yung; his oil paintings and sketches are signed "Y. Ting" and, from 1963, "Y. Y. Ting".

His family was well-off. His father, Ding Genci, was interested in poetry and antiquities and at times tutored his children in classical verse. Ding was first taught at home and then attended a village primary school that his father had funded. His early ability in painting and calligraphy was encouraged by his family and teachers. In 1916 he entered Maoming County Middle School, graduating from its four-year programme in 1920.

With sponsorship from the Guangdong provincial government, Ding travelled to Japan in the autumn of 1920 to study art. The decision was encouraged by a clan uncle, the agricultural scientist Ding Ying, who had studied in Tokyo, while his choice of school was influenced by the educator Huang Yanpei, who had described the Tokyo School of Fine Arts in one of his publications. He studied Japanese on arrival and enrolled at the Kawabata Painting School, whose Western painting department was led by Fujishima Takeji, to improve his drawing.

In September 1921 Ding entered the Western painting department of the Tokyo School of Fine Arts as one of six foreign students that year. From 1923 he studied in the studio of Wada Eisaku, a follower of Kuroda Seiki whose academic, Impressionist-leaning manner differed considerably from the freer expression Ding preferred. His years in Tokyo coincided with the return of many Japanese artists from Europe, and Post-Impressionism, Cubism and Fauvism were widely discussed; Ding took Henri Matisse as the starting point for his own work. In 1922 he visited the first exhibition of contemporary French painting held in Tokyo, and in June 1924 his still life On the Dining Table was shown at the Central Art Exhibition of Japan. He completed his graduation paintings, Self-Portrait and La Toilette, in 1925 and returned to China that autumn; school records date his formal graduation to 24 March 1926.

== Career ==
=== Shanghai and the New Art Movement ===
On returning to China in late 1925 Ding joined the art department of the newly founded Lida School in Shanghai, where his colleagues included Feng Zikai, Chen Baoyi, Guan Liang and Chen Zhifo, all of whom had studied in Japan. He held concurrent teaching posts at the Shenzhou School for Girls and at the Shanghai University of fine arts. After student unrest split the latter school that winter, Ding and Chen Baoyi left with colleagues to establish the Zhonghua University of Fine Arts with the backing of Cai Yuanpei; Ding served as a trustee and registrar and chaired its art education department.

Through the late 1920s he was among the most visible promoters of modern art in Shanghai. He helped organise the Shanghai Arts Alliance in 1927 and was elected to its standing committee, joined Guan Liang, Chen Zhifo and Tan Huamu in founding the Shanghai Arts Club in 1928, and sat on the adjudication committee for the First National Art Exhibition. He also exhibited heavily: a solo show of more than one hundred oil paintings was held at the Jiande Savings Association in June 1927, his first since returning from Japan.

=== Guangzhou, the municipal museum and the turn to ink ===
In the autumn of 1928 Ding returned to Guangzhou, where the municipal education bureau appointed him to the committees preparing the Guangzhou Municipal Museum (now the Guangzhou Museum). The museum, the first in Guangdong province, opened in February 1929; Ding served on its standing committee and headed the fine arts section, with responsibility for building a collection of Chinese and foreign art. He taught at the same time at the Guangzhou Municipal Art School and the Guangdong Sports Academy, and in February 1929 became a vice-chairman of the newly founded Guangzhou Art Association under Gao Jianfu.

The museum post gave him sustained access to Chinese painting, calligraphy and antiquities, and proved decisive. From 1929 he began collecting the work of Bada Shanren, Shitao and Jin Nong and taught himself Chinese painting, a shift criticised at the time by fellow Western-style modernists. Accounts of his collecting differ in detail: the Hong Kong Museum of Art biography dates the start of his collection to 1929, while the Li Ching Cultural and Educational Foundation records his purchase of a first Bada Shanren painting in 1936. From this point he pursued a synthesis of Chinese and Western art for the rest of his career.

He returned to Shanghai in 1932 to teach at the Xinhua College of Art and other schools, remaining until about 1940 while travelling back to Guangzhou frequently. In 1936 he proposed with Guan Liang and Wu Zifu the formation of the Wild Grass Society, later renamed the Young Art Society, which promoted the New Art Movement.

=== Wartime years ===
The Second Sino-Japanese War disrupted Shanghai's art schools; Xinhua College of Art was destroyed in the bombing of the city and others suspended teaching or moved inland. In 1942 Ding escorted his family to Maoming before continuing to Chongqing, the wartime capital. From January 1945 he taught at the National College of Art there, alongside Lin Fengmian, Feng Zikai, Guan Liang, Pang Xunqin and the young Zao Wou-Ki; he shared an apartment with Lin and Guan and formed lasting friendships with both. He took part in the Exhibition of Modern Paintings of China in January 1945 and in the first Independent Artists exhibition at Chongqing's Central Library that June. An ink painting shown at a Chongqing exhibition in August 1944 is the earliest documented public display of his work in the medium.

After the war he returned to Shanghai and joined the Society of Nine Artists, meeting regularly with Guan Liang, Ni Yide, Chen Shiwen, Tang Yun and Zhu Qizhan to discuss Chinese and Western art. In June 1946 he exhibited ink paintings in the Exposition de peintures chinoises contemporaines at the Cernuschi Museum in Paris, which acquired one of the works for its collection.

=== Guangdong Provincial College of Art ===
In August 1946 Ding took up the directorship of the Guangdong Provincial College of Art in Guangzhou, a post he held until 1949 and which the art historian Mayching Kao describes as the high point of his career in art education. He extended the course of study from two years to five, secured a permanent campus at Guangxiao Temple and recruited modern artists including Pang Xunqin to the faculty, transforming a school founded for technical training into an institute for training creative artists. He taught the oil painting classes himself and gave Chinese painting demonstrations to students. In 1948 he donated his personal library of art books to the college and was honoured by the Nationalist government with a commendation plaque. The college closed in 1949.

=== Hong Kong ===
Ding left Guangzhou for Hong Kong alone on 13 October 1949, taking only a few paintings by Bada Shanren and Shitao and about a hundred jade and bronze seals; the bulk of his collection and his own work went with his family to the ancestral home in Maoming. He adopted the name "Hong", likening himself to a wild goose flying south. Like many arrivals of that period he faced severe financial hardship, at first renting a room in a nunnery at Castle Peak. During the land reform campaigns of the early 1950s his family was classified as landowning and expelled from the family home, and the works and collection left behind were lost. In 1953 his mother, his wife and his third daughter died in succession.

From August 1951 he taught art at Tak Ming Middle School and moved into its staff quarters, at the same time beginning to take private students in Chinese painting. He held further part-time posts at All Saints' Middle School, Heong Kong College and, from 1954 to 1959, the architectural engineering department of Chu Hai College.

In 1956, at the invitation of Qian Mu, president of New Asia College, Ding joined Chen Shiwen in setting up a fine arts programme there; it was launched in February 1957 and expanded into a four-year degree programme in 1959. He taught watercolour, oil painting, flower-and-bird and insect painting, the history of Chinese painting and introductory art courses, and the department remained his institutional base for more than two decades. When the Chinese University of Hong Kong was founded in October 1963 the department became part of the university, though Ding remained on part-time terms because of staffing rules. He also chaired the art departments of Tak Ming Post-secondary College (1961), Tsung Hwa College (1964) and Tsing Hua College (1972–1977), and founded the short-lived Hung Tao College of Art in 1963. From September 1973 until his death he taught Chinese painting in the university's Department of Extramural Studies, attracting a large public following.

His first solo exhibition in Hong Kong was held in April 1957 under the auspices of the British Council, showing twelve oil paintings. In 1973 he was invited to exhibit at the University of Paris as part of the cultural programme of the 29th International Congress of Orientalists; a preview of more than 150 Chinese paintings was held at Hong Kong City Hall in March, and Ding travelled to Paris in July for the exhibition, his only trip to Europe, which gave him his first sight of original works by Matisse. From the mid-1970s he exhibited regularly in Melbourne through the East and West Art Gallery and annually with the Japanese Southern Painting Institute in Kyoto.

Ding retired from the Department of Fine Arts in July 1978 and died at St Teresa's Hospital in Kowloon on 23 December that year, aged 76.

== Works ==
=== Oil painting ===
Ding's early oils follow the Post-Impressionist and Fauvist models he encountered in Tokyo, with a vivid palette and an interest in colour as an independent expressive means. From the mid-1920s he moved away from realistic representation towards flatter, more linear compositions. Commentators have noted the persistence of primitivist motifs in this work, connected both to the European modernists' interest in African art and to Ding's own study of Chinese and East Asian carving. His engagement with brush-and-ink practice fed back into the oils, which acquired a more calligraphic rhythm and a bolder handling. From about 1955 he began incorporating archaic Chinese scripts, including forms derived from oracle bone inscriptions, into oil paintings, a device that became one of the distinguishing features of his late work. Recurring subjects include female figures, nudes, self-portraits and studio scenes.

=== Ink painting and calligraphy ===
Ding taught himself Chinese painting from the late 1920s, working from the paintings he collected rather than through formal training. His ink work is characterised by extreme economy of means: sparse compositions, a small number of rapidly drawn strokes, and subjects — fish, frogs, birds, lotus, insects, figures from opera and folklore — that recall the Ming and Qing individualists, above all Bada Shanren. He was known for "one-stroke" paintings in which a motif is set down in a single continuous line. Ink painting, calligraphy and seal engraving occupied an increasing share of his effort in his later years and became the basis of his international reputation, eventually overshadowing his earlier standing as an oil painter.

=== Seal carving ===
Ding collected archaic seals from the 1930s onward and wrote on their artistic significance, arguing that they embodied qualities available to modern art. New Asia College exhibited his collection of seals and Buddhist sculpture in 1958. He began carving his own seals around 1960, treating the seal face as a pictorial surface rather than a purely textual one, an approach that influenced later seal carvers in Hong Kong. The same archaic scripts appear across his seals, his ink paintings and his oils.

== Personal life ==
Sources differ on Ding's marriages. Kao's chronology for the Hong Kong Museum of Art records Mo Suwen as his first wife, whom he met in Shanghai on an unknown date; the Li Ching Cultural and Educational Foundation, citing the Maodong Ting Family Genealogy, identifies an earlier wife, the musician Tan Xiuzhen. Mo Suwen died in 1939 shortly after the birth of their third daughter, and in December of that year Ding married Hu Saibi in Shanghai. He had six daughters. The youngest, born in Maoming in October 1949 after he had already left for Hong Kong, never met her father, a separation Ding is said to have regretted for the rest of his life. Separated from his family for his last three decades, he sent money home under assumed names to protect them from political reprisal.

== Legacy ==
Ding is regarded as a central figure in twentieth-century Chinese modernism and in the postwar Hong Kong art world, both for his own work across oil, ink and seal carving and for the students he trained over more than two decades at New Asia College and the Chinese University of Hong Kong. Among his students were the art historian Mayching Kao and the collector and author Mok E-den, who did much to document and promote his work. In 1958 he and Chen Shiwen invited Zao Wou-Ki to lecture at New Asia College and to show works from his oracle-bone series, an exhibition credited with influencing the development of modern art in Hong Kong. Awards and a painting society bearing his name were established after his death.

=== Collections ===
Ding's work is held by the Hong Kong Museum of Art, the Art Museum of the Chinese University of Hong Kong, the University Museum and Art Gallery of the University of Hong Kong, the British Museum, the Cernuschi Museum in Paris, the National Gallery of Victoria in Melbourne, the Herbert F. Johnson Museum of Art at Cornell University and the Institute of Contemporary Arts Singapore, among others. The National Gallery of Victoria, the University of Melbourne and Monash University all acquired paintings during his 1975 Melbourne exhibition.

=== Auction history ===
Ding's work has appeared at auction consistently rather than in occasional headline sales, with lots offered regularly at Sotheby's and Christie's in Hong Kong under both "Ding Yanyong" and "Ting Yin Yung". The strongest documented result is Abstract Triangle; & Still Life with Flowers (1969), an oil work which sold for HKD11,250,000 (US$1,425,000) at Christies' 20th/21st Century Art Evening Sale in 2022.

Amongst his ink works, Ding's Eight Immortals themed paintings are the most consistently sought after by collectors. At Christie's, 7 out of the 10 strongest performing ink works by Ding on Christies are Eight Immortals-themed. Similarly, Ding's top performing ink work at Sotheby's is also Eight Immortals themed.

His seal carvings also attract interest: a group of seven seals sold for HK$403,000 at Sotheby's Hong Kong in 2022, far above its pre-sale estimate.

=== Posthumous exhibitions ===
Retrospectives include Aesthetic Images of Ding Yanyong's Paintings at the National Museum of History, Taipei (2003); No Frontiers: The Art of Ding Yanyong at the Hong Kong Museum of Art (19 December 2008 – 5 April 2009), which brought together about 200 works to mark the thirtieth anniversary of his death; a retrospective at the Art Museum of the Chinese University of Hong Kong in 2009; and Ting Yin-Yung: Sincere Brush at the same museum in 2018.

== Selected writings ==
- "My Views on the Urgent Need to Set up a School of Art in the Fourth Zhongshan University", Shen bao, 19–20 July 1927.
- "A Personal Account", Yishu xunkan (Art Ten-day Periodical), vol. 1, no. 7, 1932.
- "Mr Gao Jianfu, Harmoniser of Chinese and Western Painting", Art Wind, no. 7, 1935.
- "Modern Art and Education", Bulletin of Tak Ming Middle School, no. 4, 1956.
- "The Development of Chinese Painting and Western Painting", Bulletin of the Mencius Library, vol. 3, no. 1, 1957.
- "Archaic Seals Viewed from the Perspective of the Spirit of Chinese Traditional Culture", Bulletin of Tak Ming Middle School, no. 6, 1958.
- "Bada Shanren and Modern Art", New Asia Life, vol. 4, no. 1, 1961.
- "Xu Tianchi and Modern Art", Bulletin of Tak Ming Middle School – Special Commemorative Issue, no. 1, 1961.

== See also ==
- Chinese painting
- Lingnan School
- New Asia College
