= Shanghai School (painting) =

19th-century Chinese artistic movement

The Shanghai School (Chinese: 海上画派; pinyin: Hǎishàng Huàpài) is a style of Chinese art present in the late 19th century and centered in Shanghai. Late 19th century China, or the last years of the Qing dynasty formed a tumultuous time in China's history. This period immediately followed the defeat of China in the First Opium War by the British Empire and opened several ports, such as Shanghai, to foreign trade. This period was further destabilized by the Taiping Rebellion and the unequal treaties signed with European imperial powers. Shanghai, as an open city, became a sort of Asian melting pot where the various European powers could freely express their influence on the city. In turn, this influence gave rise to a new middle class which supported a new style of art known as the Shanghai school.

The three hundred years of Chinese art history prior to the advent of the Shanghai School was dominated by the Literati style exemplified in the paintings of Shen Zhou in the 16th century. The Shanghai-style marked the first major departure from traditionalist Chinese painting by breaking the elitist tradition of Chinese art, and focusing less on the symbolism emphasized by the Literati style and more on the visual content of the painting itself. The inspiration for this new style of painting came from 17th-century eccentrics shunned by the Chinese art community at large and 18th Century Yangzhou style painters. However, the Shanghai school was characterized by its even greater form exaggeration and brighter colors. The Shanghai School was unable to gain significant traction against the traditional painting style because of greater Western interest (and money) in the Literati tradition. In an era of rapid social change, works from the Shanghai School were widely innovative and diverse and often contained thoughtful yet subtle social commentary.

Some important artists of the Shanghai School include Wu Changshuo, Pu Hua, Zhao Zhiqian, Ren Bonian, He Tianjian, Xie Zhiliu, and Cheng Shifa.
