= Feng Jizhong =

Feng Jizhong may refer to:

- Feng Jizhong (architect), see Songjiang Square Pagoda and Mazu Cultural Palace
- Feng Jizhong, a character in The Deer and the Cauldron by Jin Yong
