= China Art Museum =

China Art Museum may refer to:

- National Art Museum of China (中国美术馆; lit. 'China Art Museum'), a national museum of China located in Dongcheng, Beijing
- China Art Museum, Shanghai, a municipal art museum located in Pudong, Shanghai
