= Square Pagoda =

Square Pagoda, translating Chinese Fangta, may refer to:

- Songjiang Square Pagoda in suburban Shanghai
- Baisigou Square Pagoda in Ningxia
- Fangta Park in Songjiang in suburban Shanghai
- Fangta Park in Changshu
