= Zhu Qizhan =

Chinese painter (1892–1996)

- 朱屺瞻
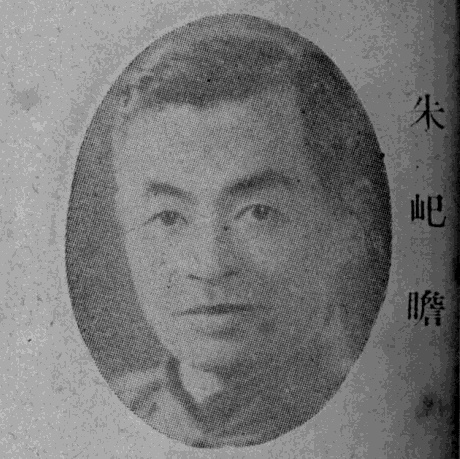
- Born: 27 May 1892; Taicang, Jiangsu province, China
- Died: 20 April 1996 (aged 103); Shanghai, China
- Education: Shanghai Fine Arts College, and Kawabata Art School, Tokyo
- Known for: Painting

Zhu Qizhan (Chinese: 朱屺瞻; Wade–Giles: Chu Ch'i-chan; May 27, 1892 – April 20, 1996) was a Chinese painter known for merging the color concepts of Western art and the calligraphic brushwork of traditional Chinese painting into a personal style.

Zhu Qizhan, courtesy name Qizhai, art name Erzhan Laomin, was a native of Taicang, Jiangsu province. In 1912, he entered the Shanghai Fine Arts College. In 1917 he studied Western oil painting with the prominent painter Fujishima Takeji (1867-1945) at the Kawabata Art School in Tokyo.

He taught in the Shanghai Fine Arts College and Shanghai Xinhua Private Art School when he was young. He became a first-class artist in the Shanghai Academy of Chinese Painting, an honorary professor of East China Normal University, and an honorary professor of the Fine Arts Department of Shanghai University. He also worked as the standing secretary of the Shanghai Artist Association, a consultant to the China Artist Association, and a consultant to the Xiling Seal Art Society. In 1991, he received the first Shanghai Literature and Art Outstanding Contribution Award.

In the 1950s, Zhu Qizhan traveled extensively in China sketching with brush and ink in the plein air. He drew on his impressions of the scenery during his lifetime. Although already in his nineties as China opened up again to the West, Zhu traveled internationally, initially to San Francisco where he painted a large artwork for the San Francisco International airport and a few years later to New York for his first solo exhibition in America at L.J. Wender Fine Chinese Painting where he demonstrated ink painting on ABC Eyewitness News.

The Chinese government has built a museum dedicated to him. He was present in May 1995 for the opening of the Zhu Qizhan Museum of Art in Shanghai. In 1996, he died at the age of 105 (East Asian age reckoning).

== Biography ==
Zhu Qizhan was born into a wealthy merchant family with a fine collection of Chinese painting in Taicang, Jiangsu province. He received a traditional education as a child and in 1912 entered the Shanghai Fine Arts College. He was an excellent student, resulting in his appointment as a professor in the College the following year. In 1917 he left for Japan to study Western oil painting with the prominent painter Fujishima Takeji (1867-1945) at the Kawabata Art School in Tokyo.

He returned to China for the May Fourth Movement of 1919. Under its influence, he left behind the literati intellectual style, and founded his work on the more basic expressions of artists who arose from the common people, like Qi Baishi (1964-1957). The colophons on Zhu's paintings were written in the vernacular rather than the classical mode. His subjects were simple landscapes and still lives. In studying Western oil painting, Zhu responded to the strong, sensuous use of color evident in the works of Post-Impressionist artists such as Cézanne, van Gogh and Matisse. Infused with the Western ideas he was exposed to in Japan, Zhu combined them with the new artistic developments emerging from China's burgeoning nationalistic identity.

Zhu was very active in the Shanghai art circle. He co-founded the Yiyuan Painting Institute with his contemporaries Wang Jiyuan, Jiang Xiaowei, Li Qiujun, Pan Yuliang, and Zhang Chenbo; became a member of the China Artists Association, Baishe Chinese painting society; exhibited both his oil painting and Chinese ink paintings; and researched and taught art in other institutes. In 1934, he was appointed director of the Shanghai Xinhua Art College.

At the start of the Cultural Revolution in 1966, Zhu Qizhan, at the age of 75, had to report to the Shanghai Painting Academy every morning. He was forced to write papers of self-criticism and sweep the streets of Shanghai. Zhu was allowed to remain at home because of ill health for five years from 1971 until the end of the Cultural Revolution in 1976. (Chu, 1994, p. 64)

After the Cultural Revolution, Zhu resumed his career. He was invited to paint murals for the Beijing Hotel, the Capital Airport in Beijing, and the Peace Hotel in Shanghai. He became a first-class artist in the Shanghai Academy of Chinese Painting, an honorary professor of the East China Normal University, and an honorary professor of the Fine Arts Department of Shanghai University. He also worked as the standing secretary of the Shanghai Artist Association, a consultant to the China Artist Association, and a consultant to the Xiling Seal Art Society.

Zhu Qizhan traveled a lot during his lifetime. He traveled to different places and sketched using the plein air method with Chinese ink and brush in the 1950s. Examples are prevalent in his early works. In 1983, he traveled to San Francisco and painted a large artwork for the San Francisco International airport. He met Ansel Adams in San Francisco and exhibited paintings in an American traveling show of contemporary Chinese artists organized by the Chinese Culture Center of San Francisco. In 1986, at the age of 95, he traveled to New York and had his first solo exhibition in America at L.J. Wender Fine Chinese Painting where he demonstrated ink painting on American Broadcasting Company (ABC) Eyewitness News.

At the age of 100, the Zhu Qizhan Centennial Art Exhibition was held in the Shanghai Art Museum. Additionally, a one-man show of landscape paintings was held at the Research Institute of Chinese Art in New York City.

In 1991, he received the first Shanghai Literature and Art Outstanding Contribution Award.

In the final two years of his life, Zhu Qizhan was fortunate to witness worldwide appreciation for his lifelong devotion to art. Solo exhibitions at the Hong Kong Museum of Art, the British Museum, and the Asian Art Museum of San Francisco were held in his honor. He was present in May 1995 for an ultimate tribute from the Chinese government, the opening of the Zhu Qizhan Museum of Art in Shanghai.

In 1996, Zhu Qizhan died on April 22 at the age of 105.

In 2001, the Shanghai Museum of Art and the city government organized a huge retrospective exhibition, Treasured Collection of Zhu Qizhan's Paintings, to commemorate the 110th anniversary of Zhu's birth.

== Artistic Style ==
Zhu Qizhan wrote that, “For many years I have gone out of my way to achieve three aims. They are independence, strength, and succinctness. Independence means a painter should have his own features instead of being dependent on or blindly worshipping those of other schools. Strength is viewed in the bold and vigorous strokes of a painter but it needs to come from his mental effort or inner world. As for succinctness, it is embodied in being terse and concise. These three principles are the criterion for creation I have closely followed.” (Wender, 2002, pp. 34–35)

Zhu Qizhan's style is marked by a vigorous and powerful presence with a great depth of expression to each brush stroke. It is a style which has evolved by fusing a dominant concept of two artistic traditions, the color concepts of Western art and the calligraphic brushwork of traditional Chinese painting. In the West, color theory was first explored by Kandinsky (1866-1944), and later systematically advanced by Josef Albers (1888-1976). Zhu Qizhan knows it intuitively. He knows which colors feel heavy, and which light, and that by placing colors side by side he can describe edges which create shadow, density, transparency, weight, and the lightness of being.

In traditional Chinese literati painting, color was considered to be only an accent upon the brushstrokes. Zhu shows us that brushstrokes in color can be as meaningful as those in ink.

"In evolving his use of strong colors, Zhu Qizhan also paid homage to the heavy pigments of the traditional blue and green style. However, he enriched the older methods with exuberantly colored, more abstract forms. Even when he toned down his pigments, the harmonies are evocative. He also became fond of free, curvilinear rhythms, but mostly through the use of colors. By means of skillful harmonies of colors, which like music is vibration, he achieved nature’s innermost force." (Chu, 1994, p. 67)

"In his use of saturated colors, he demonstrated that when color is at its richest, form is at its fullest. The form-building property of Zhu’s color manipulation is an artistic venture never previously attempted in the history of Chinese painting." (Chu, 1994, p. 67)

"Zhu Qizhan’s art embarked from both the linear and aerial perspective of which he is so much aware in his experience as a painter of Western style. In depicting depth, Zhu relies on warm-to-cold contrasts and overlapping forms to suggest “flat depth”. Thus, flatness and depth are apparent at the same time. With the aid of color gradations and repetitions, Zhu was able to link objects in the background to objects in the foreground, giving a sense of simultaneous nearness and distance." (Chu, 1994, p.67)

"In paintings after 1976, calligraphic lines took on enhanced graphic potency. Zhu Qizhan transformed the nature of lines. In some depictions, lines that normally function as contours now partake in the role of forms themselves. This must be appreciated also as one of Zhu Qizhan’s unique features. In Zhu Qizhan’s vision, ink and color have the same function of form-defining and contouring, so that Zhu Qizhan delineates shapes and describes form with color the same way he does with ink." (Chu, 1994, p. 71)

Zhu Qizhan's brushstrokes are accentuated with contrast, variation, and rhythmic sequences, which related his musical cultivation. Zhu Qizhan reminds us, “Some impressionist music expresses vague ideas and atmosphere, conveys a feeling of uncertainty and vagueness by means of hints and symbols, and gives people plenty of room for reverie. We can often achieve the same effect in painting by splashing ink or color in vigorous strokes. Artists can produce images very briefly, sometimes even in an abstract way, pungent and forceful, nebulous and intelligent. People may enjoy the aesthetic feeling that can only be sensed, but not explained in words.” (Wender, 2002, p. 37)

Throughout his life, Zhu Qizhan never stopped evolving his unique painting style, always following his objective of “independence.” Based on his early exposure to Western art, Zhu was captivated by a Western color theory that he applied to Chinese painting, propelling burgeoning reforms in modern Chinese painting and influencing a new generation of artists.

== Work ==
=== Painting ===
Zhu Qizhan is best known for merging Western color theory and Chinese brushwork into a personal style, while at the same time revolutionizing modern Chinese painting. Zhu Qizhan passed through various stages of painting during his long and active life. From his earliest traditional ink painting and oil painting, to the plein air sketching with ink and brush in the 1950s, to transforming “landscape” into “non-landscape”, as described by Professor Lars Berglund, who added that Zhu's landscape paintings represent the “landscape-idea” as pure art, as true visualizations of the artist's “own experience, imagination, and feeling.”

In Zhu's still life paintings, objects are painted with bold and suggestive colors and just the minimal number of strokes to convey their essence, which goes beyond a two-dimensional depiction on paper.

=== Calligraphy ===
A solid background in calligraphy is essential for Chinese painters. Zhu Qizhan practiced various calligraphy styles, and was especially fond of the ancient styles of Mi Fei, and Yan Zhenqing. Their influence can be seen in both his calligraphy and painting. (Chu, 1994, p. 54)

=== Porcelain ===
Together with Lin Fengmian (1900-1991), Wang Geyi (1897-1988) and Tang Yun (1910-1993), Zhu Qizhan traveled to Jingdezhen, Jiangxi and Jiangsu in October 1964. There, under the supervision of master potters, he painted on porcelain using over-glaze painting. Zhu painted over eighty pieces within fifteen days and was pleased with the effect that differed from painting on paper. (Chu, 1994, p. 62, pp. 556–563)

== Collections ==
His works are in numerous museum collection including the British museum, Metropolitan Museum in New York, Asian Art Museum in San Francisco, The Eskenazi Museum of Art in Indiana, Yale University Art Gallery, Connecticut, National Gallery of Victoria, Australia, Art Gallery of New South Wales, Australia, The UNESCO works of art collection, the Baur Collection, Geneva, Switzerland, and the Zhu Qizhan Art Museum

== Bibliography ==
- Chu, Christina. “Encounter with Zhu Qizhan”. Hong Kong: Hong Kong Urban Council and Hong Kong Museum of Art, 1994. ISBN 962-215-119-1
- Zhang Peiling and Zhang Yinci. “Shiji danqing: Yishu dashi Zhu Qizhan zhuan [A Century of Painting: Biography of the Artistic Master Zhu Qizhan]”. Shanghai: Sanlian Shudian, 1990.
- Feng Qi-yong and Yin Guang-ha. “A Chronicle of Zhu Qi-zhan’s Life”. Shanghai: Shuhua Chuban She, 1986.
