= Tianfei Palace (Songjiang) =

Temple in Shanghai, China

Coordinates: 32.09417°N 118.74111°E

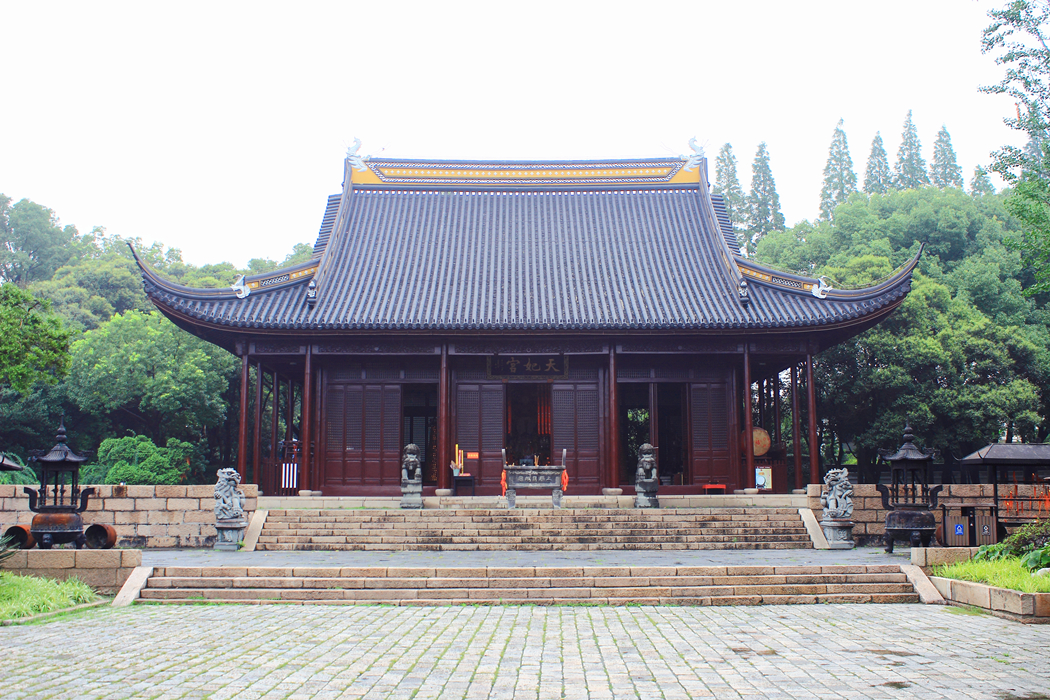
- Traditional Chinese: 天妃宮
- Simplified Chinese: 天妃宫
- Literal meaning: Heavenly Consort Palace
Transcriptions
Standard Mandarin
- Hanyu Pinyin: Tiānfēi Gōng
- Wade–Giles: T‘ien-fei Kung

Mazu Cultural Palace
- Traditional Chinese: 天媽文化館
- Simplified Chinese: 天妈文化馆
- Literal meaning: Heavenly Mother Athenaeum
Transcriptions
Standard Mandarin
- Hanyu Pinyin: Tiānmā Wénhuàguǎn
- Wade–Giles: T‘ien Ma Wen-hua-kuan

Tianhou Temple
- Traditional Chinese: 天后宮
- Simplified Chinese: 天后宫
- Literal meaning: Heavenly Empress Palace
Transcriptions
Standard Mandarin
- Hanyu Pinyin: Tiānhòu Gōng
- Wade–Giles: T‘ien-hou Kung

The Tianfei Palace, officially the Mazu Cultural Palace and also known as the Tianhou Palace, is a restored temple of the Chinese sea-goddess Mazu, the deified form of the medieval Fujianese shamaness Lin Moniang, located in Fangta Park in Songjiang, Shanghai, in eastern China. Officially classified as a museum, the Tianfei Palace conducts Mazuist rites twice a year, on the traditional anniversaries of Lin Moniang's birth and death. It is also used as the site for an annual commemoration of Songjiang's city god Li Daiwen.

== History ==
The Tianfei Palace was first erected on Henan Rd. just north of Suzhou Creek in downtown Shanghai in 1883. By that time, the traditional celebrations of Mazu's temple festival during the week of the 23rd day of the third lunar month had already been curtailed. It was the last of Shanghai's Mazu temples to be destroyed. (Note: The Shengfei Temple (t 聖妃宮, s 圣妃宫, Shèngfēi Gōng) and the South Shengfei Temple (t 南聖妃宮, s 南圣妃宫, Nánshèngfēi Gōng) were both entirely lost at some point. The original Shunji or Smooth Crossing Temple (t 順濟廟, s 顺济庙, Shùnjì Miào), also known as the Danfeng or Crimson Phoenix Tower (t 丹鳳樓, s 丹凤楼, Dānfèng Lóu), was erected in 1271 but destroyed during the construction of Shanghai's city walls in 1553. It was rebuilt by Gu Gongyuan (t 顧拱元, s 顾拱元, Gù Gǒngyuán) over the Wanjun Post (t 萬軍台, s 万军台, Wànjūn Tái) on the walls' northeast corner. The resulting structure was the highest point in Shanghai and listed among the city's Eight Views; it was repaired in 1812 and again after the damaged caused by the Small Swords Society's occupation of the city during the Taiping Rebellion, but it was eventually demolished.)

Following on the heels of a renovation of Songjiang's Square Pagoda in the mid-1970s, Feng Jizhong conceived of the idea of creating a park around it to celebrate traditional Chinese architecture after the ravages of the Cultural Revolution. As part of his design for Fangta Park, he sought to relocate and rebuild the ruins of the old Mazu temple. However, because Mazuism is not officially recognized as either Taoist or Buddhist, Chinese law considers it a tolerable but illegal cult and—at minimum—requires local government to demonstrate strong local demand for new temples before allowing their construction. Songjiang figured that only about 10% of its population was religious in any sense and only a few migrants adhered to Mazuism anywhere within Shanghai; nonetheless they were able to approve the plan as the Mazu Cultural Palace, a restoration of a historical monument under the auspices of the Ministry of Culture and the management of the Parks Department. The temple was moved in 1978 (Note: The old temple platform on Henan Rd. was demolished in 2006 and the last remnants of the temple's former location were levelled during road-widening operations in 2007. Zhabei District's municipal government is, however, considering rebuilding the temple as part of its renovation of the Suzhou Creek waterfront.) and initial repairs completed by 1980. It was protected by the district-level government in October 1993.

Another reason for Songjiang's approval of the temple was the belief that the presence of a temple to Mazu—a very popular deity on Taiwan—would encourage investment from Chinese businessmen there. One such businessman even funded completing the temple's restoration in 2001, allowing it to be fully opened in 2002. It was protected by Shanghai's municipal government in April 2014. (Note: The temple's former site was given protected status by the Zhabei District government in 2000.)

== Architecture ==
The main hall is a brick-and-wood structure 17 meters (56 ft) high and covering an area of 330 square meters (3,600 sq ft). It includes authentic and restored Qing-era architectural forms, carvings, and inscriptions, including calligraphy by Chen Peiqiu, Wu Jianxian (吴健贤, Wú Jiànxián), and Zhou Huijun (周慧珺, Zhōu Huìjùn).

== Services ==
The temple includes an altar, burning incense, and recorded chanting but is unregistered with the religious authorities, it lacks a permanent priest, and all ticket proceeds benefit the parks department. For Mazuist immigrants and tourists, the Tianfei Palace hires Fujianese priests to visit and conduct religious services twice a year, on the traditional anniversaries of Lin Moniang's birth and death. Without condoning the quasi-legal cult, the park workers consider that "this is just good business" (这是比好买卖).

The temple is also the site of an unrelated annual commemoration of the birth of Li Daiwen (李待問, Lǐ Dāiwèn), a Ming official who unsuccessfully resisted the Qing invasion of the area but became celebrated as one of Songjiang's city gods. Thousands of bowls of soy milk and youtiao are distributed to those who gather to burn incense in his honor. Because the celebration follows the Chinese lunar calendar, its date (18/6) varies from year to year in the Gregorian system.

== See also ==
- List of Mazu temples
