= Changzhou Museum =

Museum in Changzhou, China

- 常州博物馆
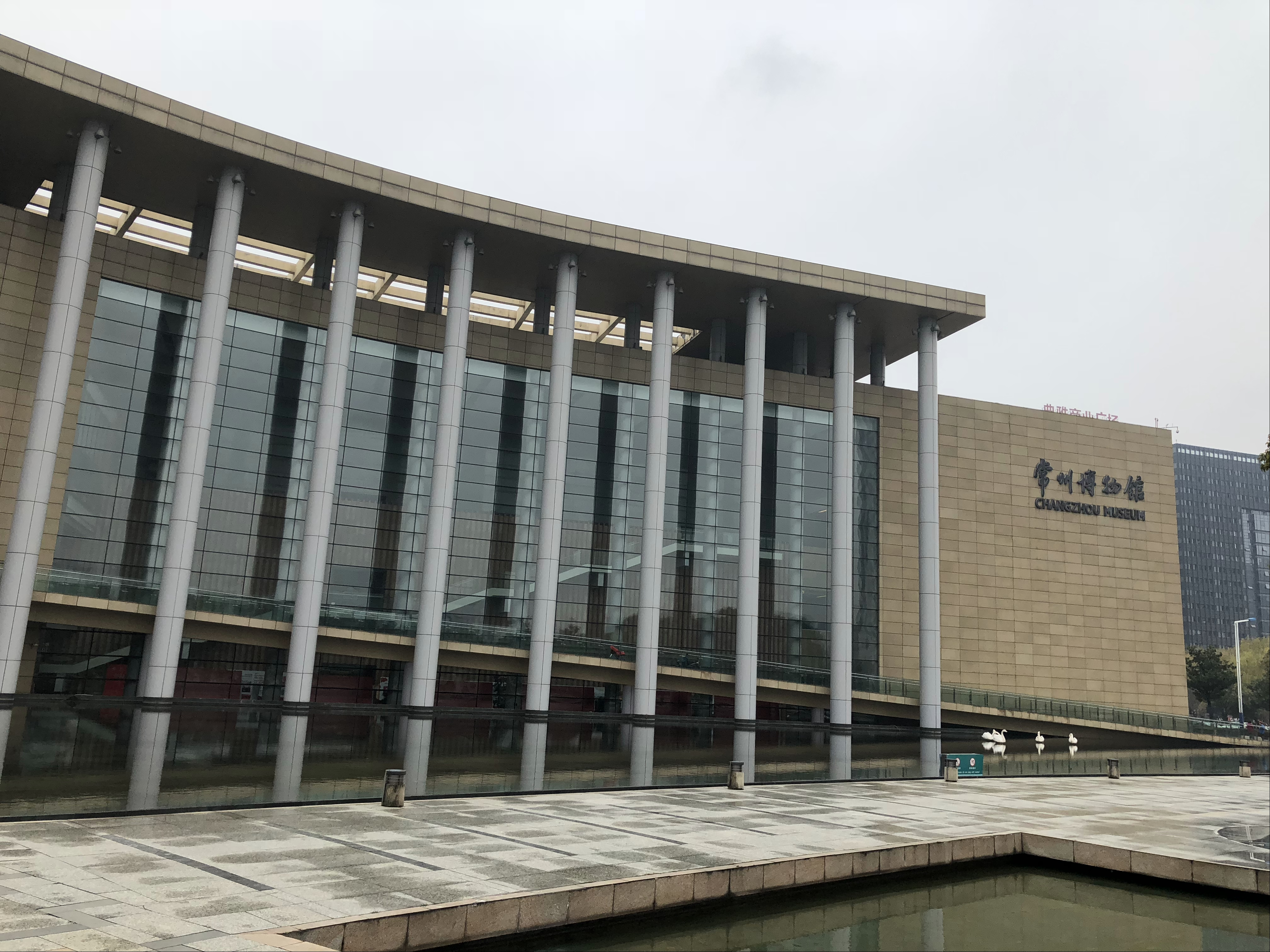
- Established: 1958
- Location: Changzhou, Jiangsu, China
- Website: www.czmuseum.com

The Changzhou Museum (Chinese: 常州博物馆) is a comprehensive museum in the city of Changzhou, in southern Jiangsu province of China. Established in 1958, it exhibits a large collection of artifacts, and has a research department. There are eight sections and more than 20,000 cultural relics. High-quality relics include original green porcelain of the Spring and Autumn period and Warring States period, lacquerware and porcelains in Song and Yuan dynasties and paintings and calligraphy in Qing and Ming dynasties and so on. Changzhou museum was awarded the title of "Patriotic education base of Jiangsu province" and "Excellent museum of Jiangsu province". Over its first fifty years, the museum moved three times. The new building has been located to the west of People's Square since December 2006, and was opened to the public on April 28, 2007.

== Collections ==
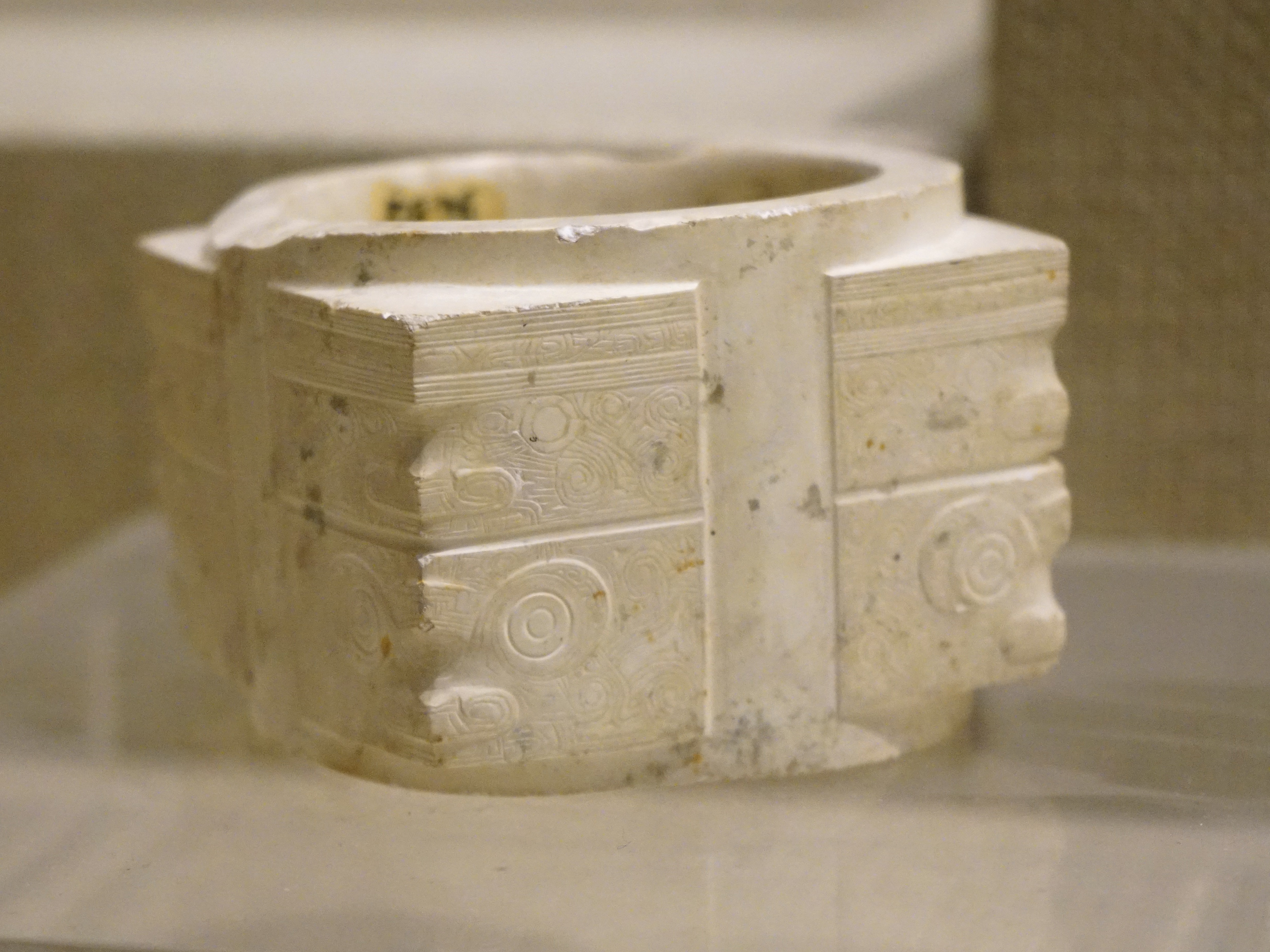
Jade Cong with Combined Patterns of Human and Animal Face. Liangzhu Culture.

Changzhou museum is a comprehensive museum, including the only children’s museum in Jiangsu province. Its collection of cultural relics include more than 20,000 pieces, among which there are 27 pieces of national first grade cultural relics (national treasures), 166 pieces of the second-class historical relics, 3,129 pieces of the third-class historical relics, national second and third grade animals and plants, and 103 fossil specimens. Its historical culture exhibition is famous for its cultural relics, which show the cultural deposits. Its natural display is the most characteristic display of the comprehensive museums among the whole province. The Xie Zhiliu art gallery displays the art career and achievement of Changzhou native Xie Zhiliu. Among these treasures, the jade in the Liangzhu culture period is full of characteristics of collection antiques in Changzhou Museum.

== Buildings ==
Changzhou museum was a key project of the cultural development of eleventh five-year period for the Changzhou government. It is also a landmark of cultural construction in Changzhou. The new Changzhou Museum had been completed in December 2006 and it was officially open to the public on April 28 of 2007. With the construction area of 20000 square meters, Changzhou Museum was combined with the urban planning exhibition hall. The overall construction is divided into five levels: four floors about the ground, and one storey underground. The first and the floors are for display and the exhibition and the four-storey and the basement is home to storehouses and offices. The show area of the new museum is nearly 10000 square meters.
