= Hua Tianyou =

Chinese artist (1901–1986)

Hua Tianyou 滑田友
- Born: Hua Tingyou (滑庭友); 1901; Huaiyin, Jiangsu province
- Died: 1986 (aged 84–85)
- Known for: Sculpture

Hua Tianyou (Chinese: 滑田友; 1901–1986), courtesy name Shunqing (舜卿), was a Chinese artist and a pioneer of the field of sculpture in modern China.

== Biography ==
Born Hua Tingyou (滑庭友) in Huaiyin, Jiangsu province in 1901, Hua graduated from the No. 6 Normal School of Jiangsu Province in 1924. In 1933 he left China to study at the École nationale supérieure des Beaux-Arts in Paris.

He returned to China in 1947 at the encouragement of Xu Beihong. After the founding of the People's Republic of China in 1949, he became a professor at the China Central Academy of Fine Arts, and served as the first director of the sculpture department of the academy.

Hua is one of the seven artists featured in the Exhibition for Noted Painters at the China Art Museum of Shanghai. His works are also in the collections of the National Art Museum of China in Beijing, and the Musée National d'Art Moderne in Paris.
