= Chen Peiqiu =

Chinese painter (1922–2020)

- Born: December 29, 1922; Nanyang, Henan, Republic of China
- Died: June 26, 2020 (aged 97); Zhongshan Hospital, Shanghai, China
- Education: National Academy of Art
- Known for: Guohua
- Spouse: Xie Zhiliu
- Awards: Lifetime Achievement Award, Shanghai Art and Literature Prize (2014)

Chinese name
- Traditional Chinese: 陳佩秋
- Simplified Chinese: 陈佩秋
Transcriptions
Standard Mandarin
- Hanyu Pinyin: Chén Pèiqiū
- Wade–Giles: Ch'en^{2} P'ei^{4}-ch'iu^{1}
- IPA: [ʈʂʰə̌n pʰêɪ tɕʰjóʊ]

Chen Peiqiu (29 December 1922 – 26 June 2020) was a Chinese calligrapher and guohua painter, often acclaimed as the foremost Chinese woman painter. She and her husband Xie Zhiliu were one of the most famous couples in Chinese visual arts. The government of Shanghai opened a museum in Nanhui New City dedicated to them.

== Biography ==
Chen Peiqiu was born in 1922 in Nanyang, Henan Province. During the Second Sino-Japanese War, she took refuge with her family in Kunming, Yunnan Province. In childhood she was influenced by her mother, who was an artist, but Chen was more interested in engineering, as she thought it would be more beneficial to the society. Although she was accepted by the engineering department of National Southwestern Associated University, her family opposed her choice and forced her to transfer to the economics department. She ended up not attending the university.

During World War II, Kunming was a major hub for refugees from all over China. Chen attended an art exhibition of Huang Junbi, a prominent painter of the Lingnan School. With Huang's encouragement, she applied to the National Academy of Art (now China Academy of Art in Hangzhou) and was accepted. She was influenced by Professor Li Keran and other artists who taught at the academy. She studied Chinese painting (guohua) and graduated in 1950.

Chen specialized in traditional Chinese painting, especially landscape, flowers, and birds, although she was also interested in impressionism and postimpressionism. She exhibited in the first Shanghai Biennale in 2000.

Chen was married to the famous painter Xie Zhiliu (1910–1997), with whom she often collaborated. They are one of the best known couples in Chinese art.

== Art market ==
Chen Peiqiu is one of the most prominent modern women artists in China. She has been listed on every edition of the Hurun Art List of best-selling living Chinese artists at auction, since its inception, until her death in 2020. In 2016, she was ranked number 16 on the list with sales of US$7.9 million. Only three of the top 100 artists on the list were women, and Chen was the highest-ranked among them. One of her landscape paintings was sold in 2014 for $3.4 million.

== Honours ==
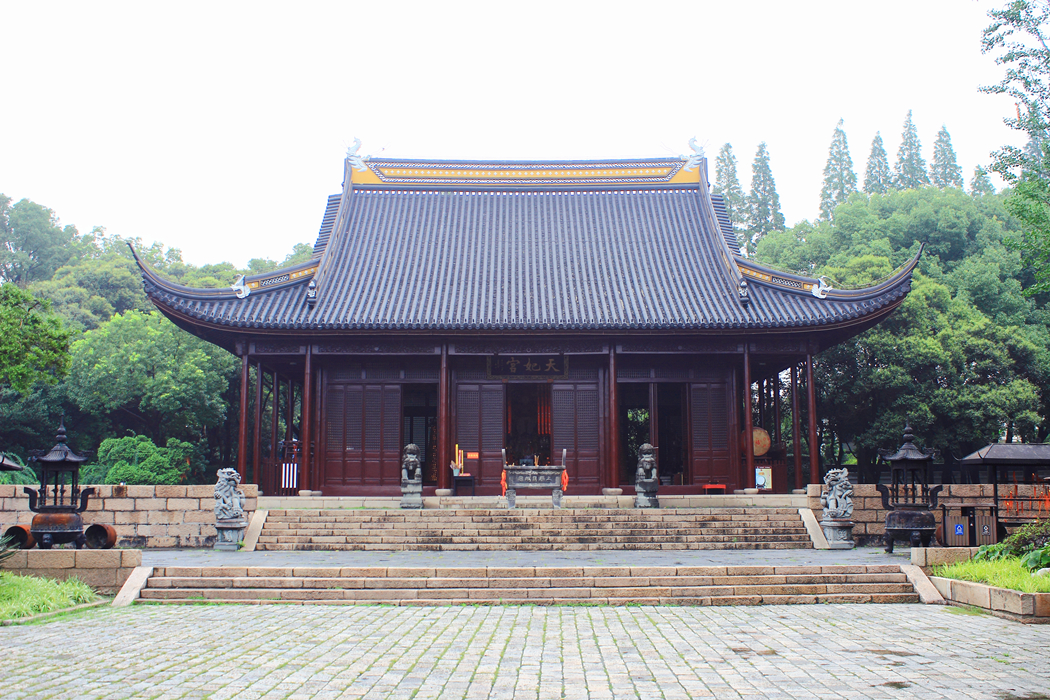
The Tianfei Palace in Songjiang

In late 2014, Chen Peiqiu was awarded the lifetime achievement award of the Shanghai Art and Literature Prize. In 2015, the Shanghai municipal government opened the Xie Zhiliu and Chen Peiqiu Art Gallery in Nanhui New City, Pudong, in honour of the artist couple. Some of her calligraphy is also preserved at the Tianfei Palace in Songjiang's Fangta Park.
