= Xie Zhiliu =

Chinese painter and calligrapher (1910–1997)

Xie Zhiliu 謝稚柳
- Born: Xie Zhi; 1910; Wujin, Jiangsu, China
- Died: 1997 (aged 86–87)
- Known for: Ink wash painting, calligraphy
- Movement: Shanghai School
- Spouse: Chen Peiqiu

Chinese name
- Traditional Chinese: 謝稚柳
- Simplified Chinese: 谢稚柳
Transcriptions
Standard Mandarin
- Wade–Giles: Hsieh Chih-liu

Xie Zhiliu (Chinese: 谢稚柳; 1910–1997) was a leading traditional painter, calligrapher, and art connoisseur of modern China. He was a noted member of the Shanghai School of art. Xie and his wife Chen Peiqiu are one of the most famous couples in Chinese art. The government of Shanghai has opened a museum in Nanhui New City dedicated to them.

== Biography ==
Born Xie Zhi (谢稚) in Wujin (now part of Changzhou), Jiangsu province in 1910, Xie went by his courtesy name Zhiliu. He also used the art name Zhuangmusheng (壮暮生) in his later life.

Xie began learning to paint at the age of nine, and received an education according to the Chinese artistic tradition, which is a combination of drawing directly from life and copying the paintings of old masters. At the age of 19 he began to emulate the style of Ming dynasty master Chen Hongshou.

In the 1930s Xie Zhiliu befriended the famous painter Zhang Daqian. In 1942 Xie went to Dunhuang with Zhang to study the art of the Mogao Caves. After returning he published several books including Records of Dunhuang Art (敦煌艺术叙录) and Compilation of Dunhuang Cave Art (敦煌石窟集).

In 1943, Xie was hired as an art professor by the National Central University (now Nanjing University), then exiled in Chongqing during the Second Sino-Japanese War. He held personal exhibitions in many Chinese cities including Chengdu, Chongqing, Kunming, Xi'an, and Shanghai. After the founding of the People's Republic of China in 1949, he worked on cultural relic preservation, and served as a consultant for the Shanghai Museum and vice chairman of the Shanghai branch of the China Artists Association.

== Museum collections ==
Xie Zhiliu's works are in the collection of the National Art Museum of China in Beijing, and he is one of the seven artists featured in the Exhibition for Noted Painters at the China Art Museum in Shanghai. He donated many artworks to his hometown Changzhou, which established the Xie Zhiliu Art Gallery in the Changzhou Museum in 1992.

In 2010, the Metropolitan Museum of Art of New York City held an exhibition of around 150 of his works donated by his daughter Sarah Shay, commemorating his 100th birthday.

Xie Zhiliu's wife Chen Peiqiu is also a well-known artist. In 2015, the Shanghai municipal government opened the Xie Zhiliu and Chen Peiqiu Art Gallery in Nanhui New City, Pudong, in honour of the artist couple.
