= He Tianjian =

Chinese guohua painter

He Tianjian 贺天健
- Born: He Jun; 1891; Wuxi, Jiangsu, China
- Died: 2 April 1977 (aged 85–86)
- Known for: Chinese painting
- Movement: Shanghai School

He Tianjian (Chinese: 贺天健; 1891 – 2 April 1977), formerly romanized as Ho T'ien-chien, was a Chinese guohua painter and a leading member of the Shanghai School of art.

== Biography ==
He Tianjian was born He Jun (贺骏) in Wuxi, Jiangsu province in 1891. He was also known by the name He Bingnan (贺炳南). He began to paint at the age of eight. In 1911 he briefly studied at the Guomin University (国民大学) in Nanjing, but dropped out the same year and joined the Zhonghua Book Company in Shanghai as an editor for paintings. In the 1920s he taught landscape painting in Wuxi, Nanjing, and Shanghai.

He became extremely influential in the 1930s and 1940s. After the founding of the People's Republic of China in 1949, he became a staff painter at the Shanghai Institute of Chinese Painting.

He Tianjian is one of the seven artists featured in the Exhibition for Noted Painters at the China Art Museum in Shanghai. His works are also in the collection of the Metropolitan Museum of Art.
