= Guan Liang =

Chinese painter (1900–1986)

Guan Liang 关良
- Born: 1900; Panyu, Guangdong, China
- Died: 1986 (aged 85–86); Shanghai
- Known for: Oil painting, ink wash painting

Guan Liang (Chinese: 关良; 1900–1986), courtesy name Lianggong (良公), was a Chinese painter. He was an important representative of the first generation of oil painters in China and was known for blending Western and Chinese art styles.

== Biography ==
Guan Liang was born in Panyu, Guangdong province in 1900. In 1917 he went to Tokyo, Japan, where he studied oil painting under Fujishima Takeji. After returning to China in 1922, he taught at the Shanghai Fine Arts School and the National Academy of Art (present-day China Academy of Art) in Hangzhou,and Wuchang College of Arts (today's Hubei Institute of Fine Arts). In 1927 he joined the Northern Expedition (Beifa War) against the northern warlords, and was in charge of arts and publicity for the Expedition army.

In 1940 Guan Liang held his first solo exhibition in Chengdu, Sichuan province. In 1957 he was among the three artists chosen by the government to exhibit at the Berlin Arts Institute in East Germany. Guan settled in Shanghai in the 1960s, where he lived until his death in 1986. He was vice chairman of the Shanghai branch of the Chinese Artists Association and a member of Shanghai Research Institute of Culture and History. He was also a recognized art educator, and was director of the art research office at Shanghai Jiao Tong University. In 1987, the Shanghai Art Museum held an exhibition of his works in his memory.

Although Guan began his career as an oil painter, he later focussed on traditional Chinese ink wash painting featuring characters from Peking operas. He is considered the first artist to introduce Western painting techniques to traditional ink wash painting and is known for his unique portrayal of Peking opera figures. His representative works include Stealing the Royal Horse (盗御马) and Farewell to my Concubine (霸王别姬), both scenes from traditional Peking operas.

Guan Liang is one of the seven artists featured in the Exhibition for Noted Painters at the China Art Museum in Shanghai.
