= China Art Museum, Shanghai =

Municipal art museum in Pudong, Shanghai, China

China Art Museum, Shanghai (Shanghai Art Museum)
- 中华艺术宫（上海美术馆）

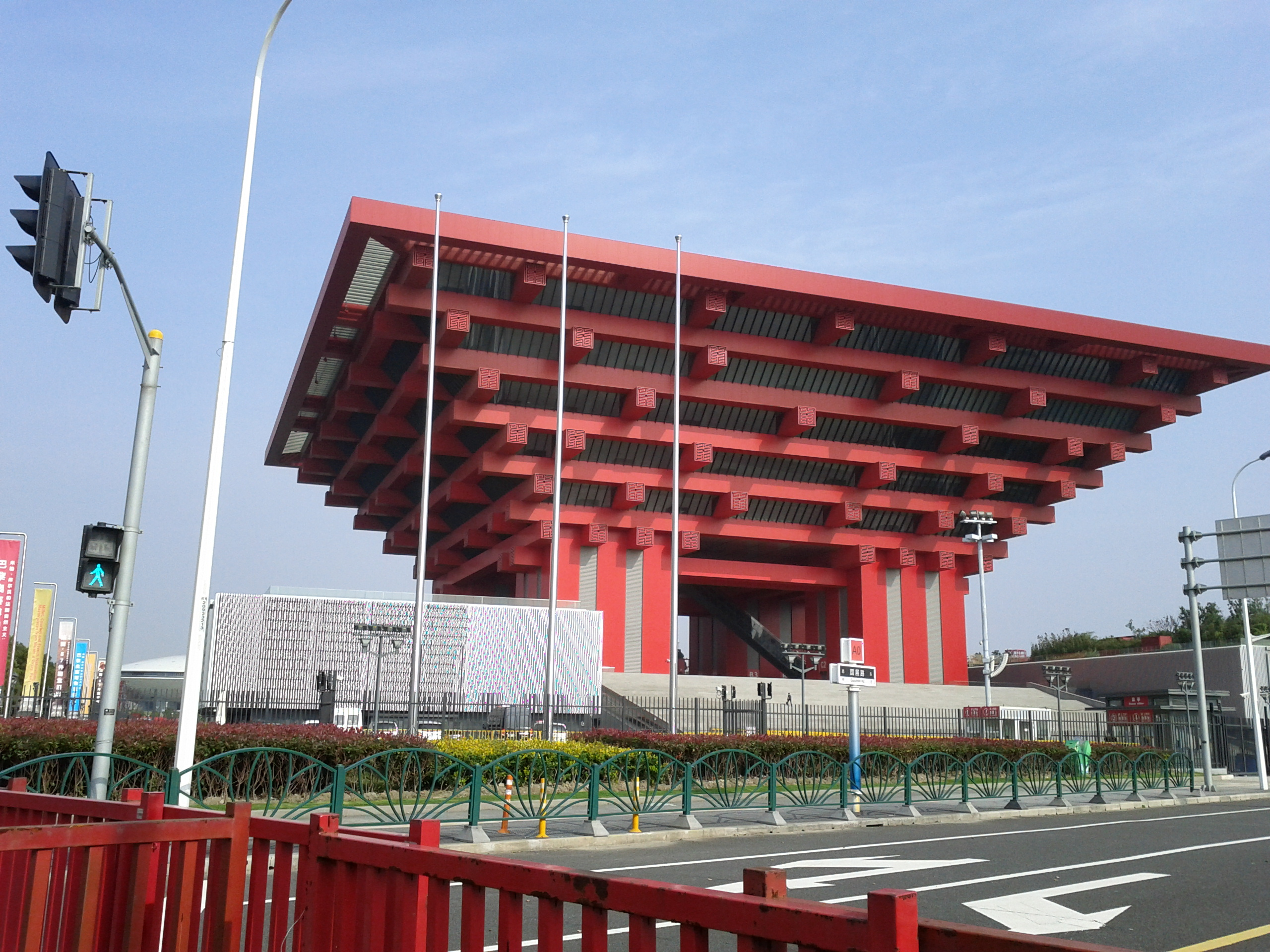
- The museum is housed in the former China Pavilion of Expo 2010

- Location of the museum in Shanghai
- Established: 2012
- Location: Pudong, Shanghai, China
- Coordinates: 31°11′11″N 121°29′24″E
- Visitors: 2.55 million (2017)
- Director: Shi Dawei (施大畏)
- Public transit access: China Art Museum Station on Shanghai Metro Line 8
- Website: artmuseumonline.org

China Art Museum, Shanghai (Shanghai Art Museum) is a municipal art museum of Shanghai City. It is a public welfare institution funded by the Shanghai City Culture and Tourism Bureau.

The museum is housed in the China Pavilion building, formerly of the Expo 2010 Shanghai China.

== History ==
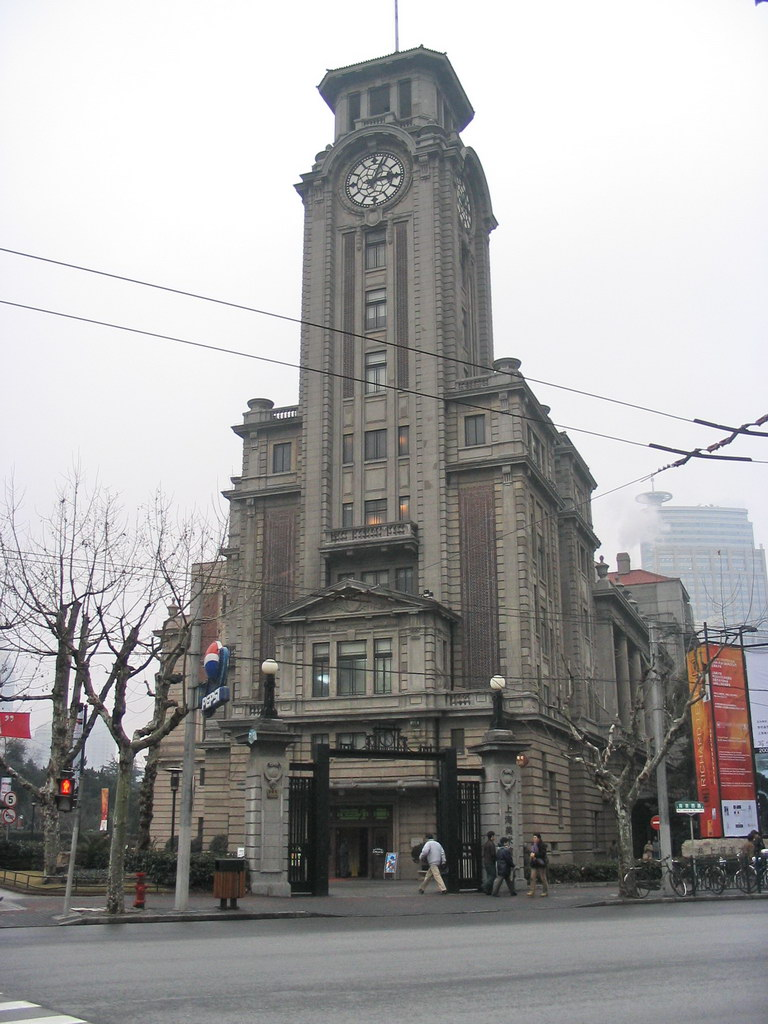
The Shanghai Art Museum was housed in the Shanghai Race Club building.

The Shanghai Art Museum was established in 1956 in a former restaurant on West Nanjing Road and was completely rebuilt in 1986. On 18 March 2000, the museum relocated to the former Shanghai Race Club building on People's Square, which had housed the Shanghai Library until 1997. With the move, its exhibition space increased from 2,200 to 5,800 square meters.

Shanghai hosted Expo 2010 from 1 May to 31 October 2010. The China Pavilion received close to 17 million visitors. Owing to its popularity, the China Pavilion was reopened for six extra months after the end of the Shanghai Expo. In November 2011, the Shanghai Municipal People's Government announced that the China Pavilion building from Expo 2010 would become the new home of the Shanghai Art Museum and would concurrently be named the "China Art Museum, Shanghai." Meanwhile, the Urban Future Pavilion would be converted into the Power Station of Art, a municipal museum for contemporary art.

The China Art Museum, Shanghai and the Power Station of Art both opened on 1 October 2012, China's National Day. The Shanghai Race Club building, where the Shanghai Art Museum was previously housed in, which remained open until 31 December 2012, receiving more than 12,000 visitors in its last two days. The new building of the art museum, which is the China Pavilion from Expo 2010, spans 64,000 sq. meters and is more than ten times larger than the art museum's previous building.

== Architecture ==
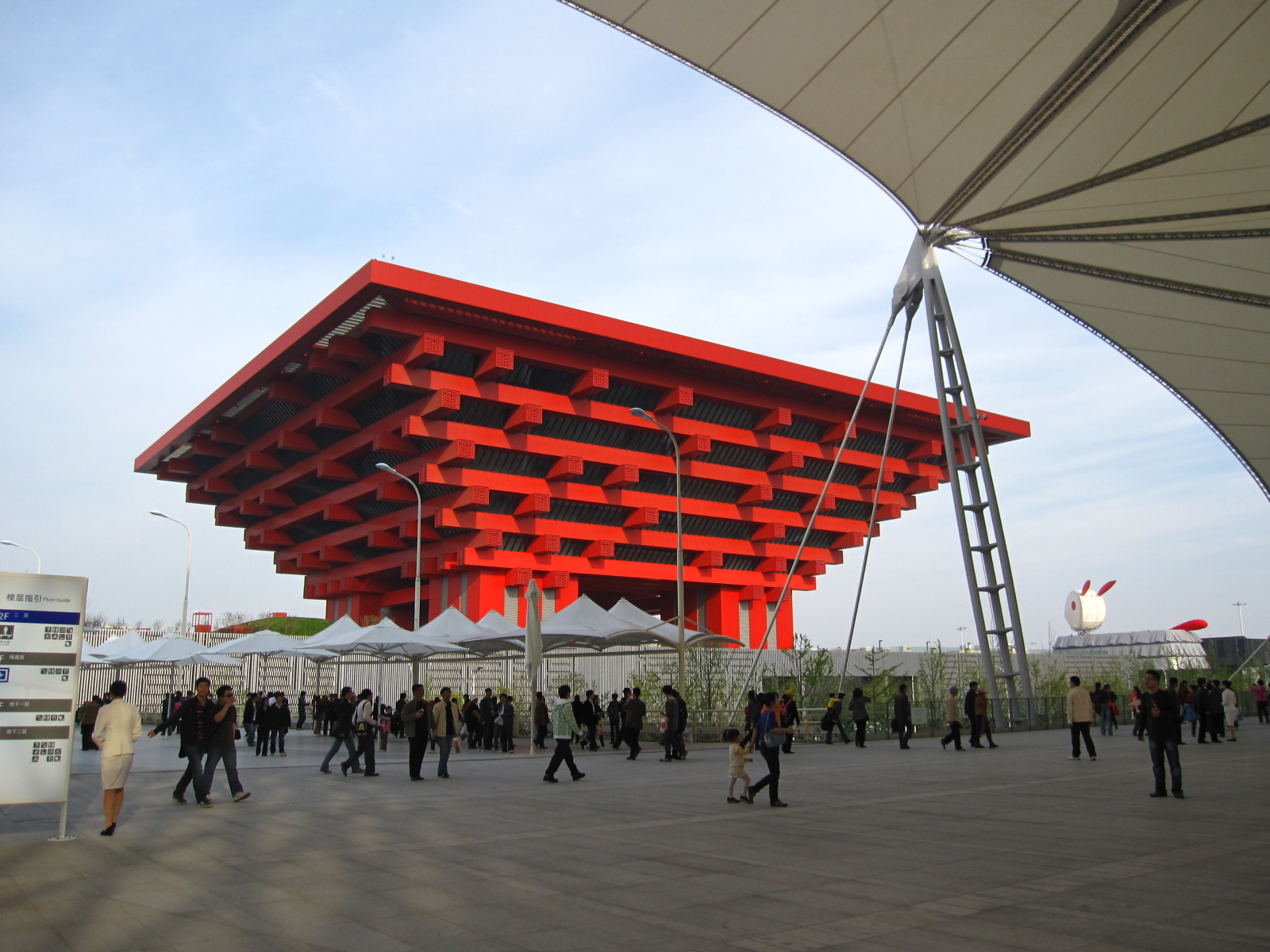
The building as seen from the Expo Axis.

Construction for the China Pavilion of the Shanghai Expo began on 28 December 2007, and the building was completed on 8 February 2010. It was the most expensive pavilion at the Expo, costing an estimated US$220 million. The 63-metre high pavilion, the tallest structure at the Expo, is dubbed "the Crown of the East" due to its resemblance to an ancient crown. The building was designed by a team led by architect He Jingtang, who were inspired by the Chinese corbel bracket called dougong as well as the ancient bronze cauldron called ding.

== Exhibitions ==
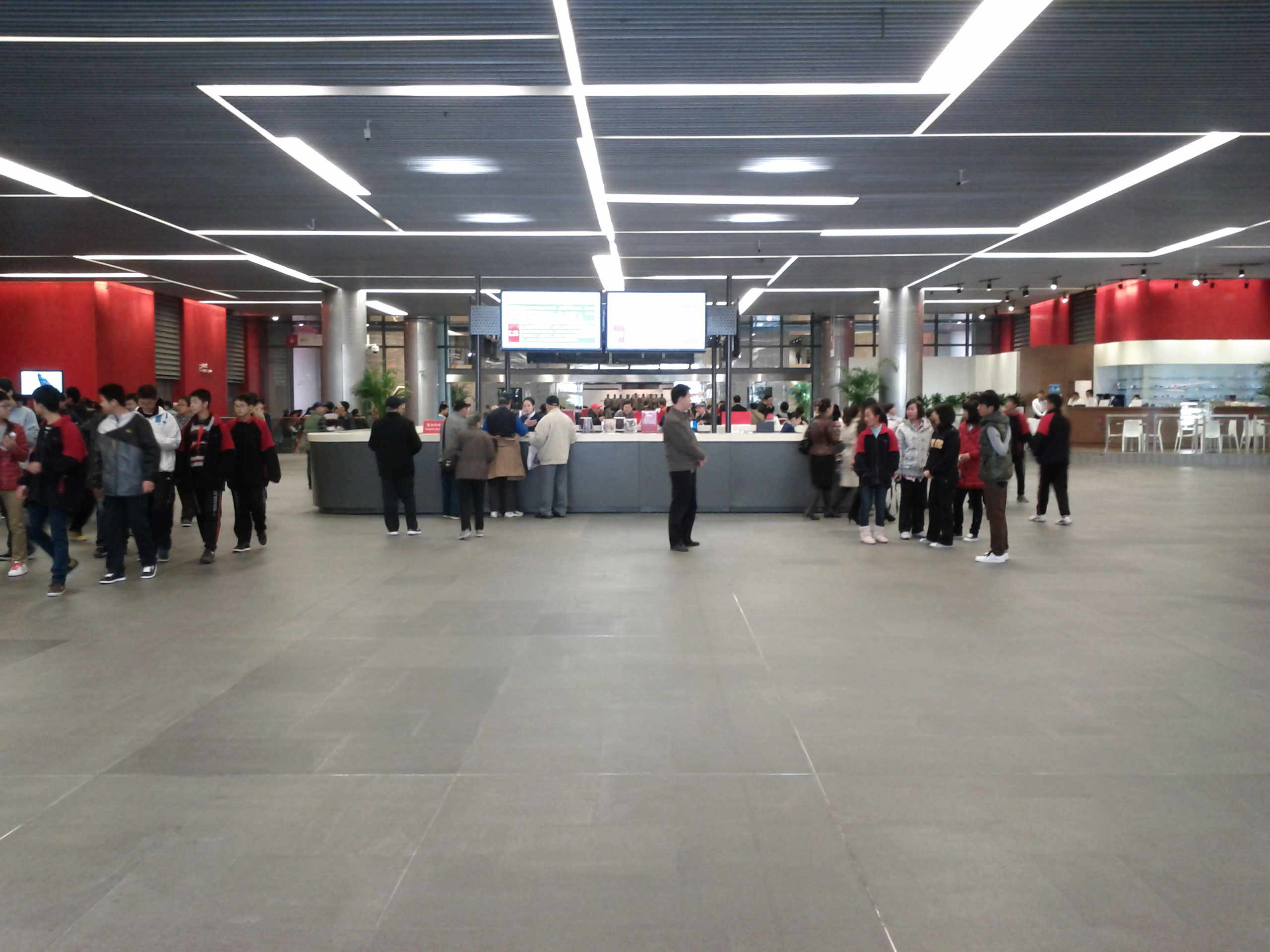
Interior of the museum.

The China Art Museum, Shanghai has a collection of about 14,000 artworks, mainly of Chinese modern art.

=== Origin of Chinese modern and contemporary art ===
"The Bright Moon Rises from the Sea – Origin of the Chinese Modern and Contemporary Art" (海上生明月—中国近现代美术之源) is a permanent exhibition that chronicles the development of contemporary and modern Chinese art, starting with the Shanghai School at the end of the Qing Dynasty. It is divided into three periods (Qing, the Republic of China, and the People's Republic of China) and ten units, covering two floors with more than 6,000 works of art. The exhibition is curated by Lu Fusheng (卢辅圣).

=== Exhibition for noted painters ===
The Exhibition for Noted Painters (名家艺术陈列专馆) is a permanent exhibition that showcases works by some of the most famous modern Chinese artists. The first phase features the works of seven artists: He Tianjian, Xie Zhiliu, and Cheng Shifa from the Shanghai School; Lin Fengmian, Guan Liang, and Wu Guanzhong who pioneered the blending of Chinese and Western art styles; and Hua Tianyou, a founder of modern Chinese sculpture.

=== Art featuring the history and culture of Shanghai ===
This exhibition showcases artworks created for a government project that encourages artworks featuring Shanghai's historical and cultural development. The themes include people, historical events, folk customs, and architecture. The project lasted three years from 2010 to 2013.

=== 21st century Chinese art ===
"The Picturesque China – Developing Chinese Fine Art in the New Century" (锦绣中华—行进中的新世纪中国美术) was a year-long exhibition that features 21st-century artworks created by more than 260 Chinese artists. It was divided into five units. The exhibition ended on 30 September 2013.

=== Special exhibitions ===
The museum frequently hosts special themed exhibitions. In its first year of operation it hosted more than a dozen special exhibitions including Taiwanese art, the second Shanghai Photography Exhibition, and Gustave Courbet and Jean-François Millet from the collection of the Musée d'Orsay of Paris.

=== Gallery ===
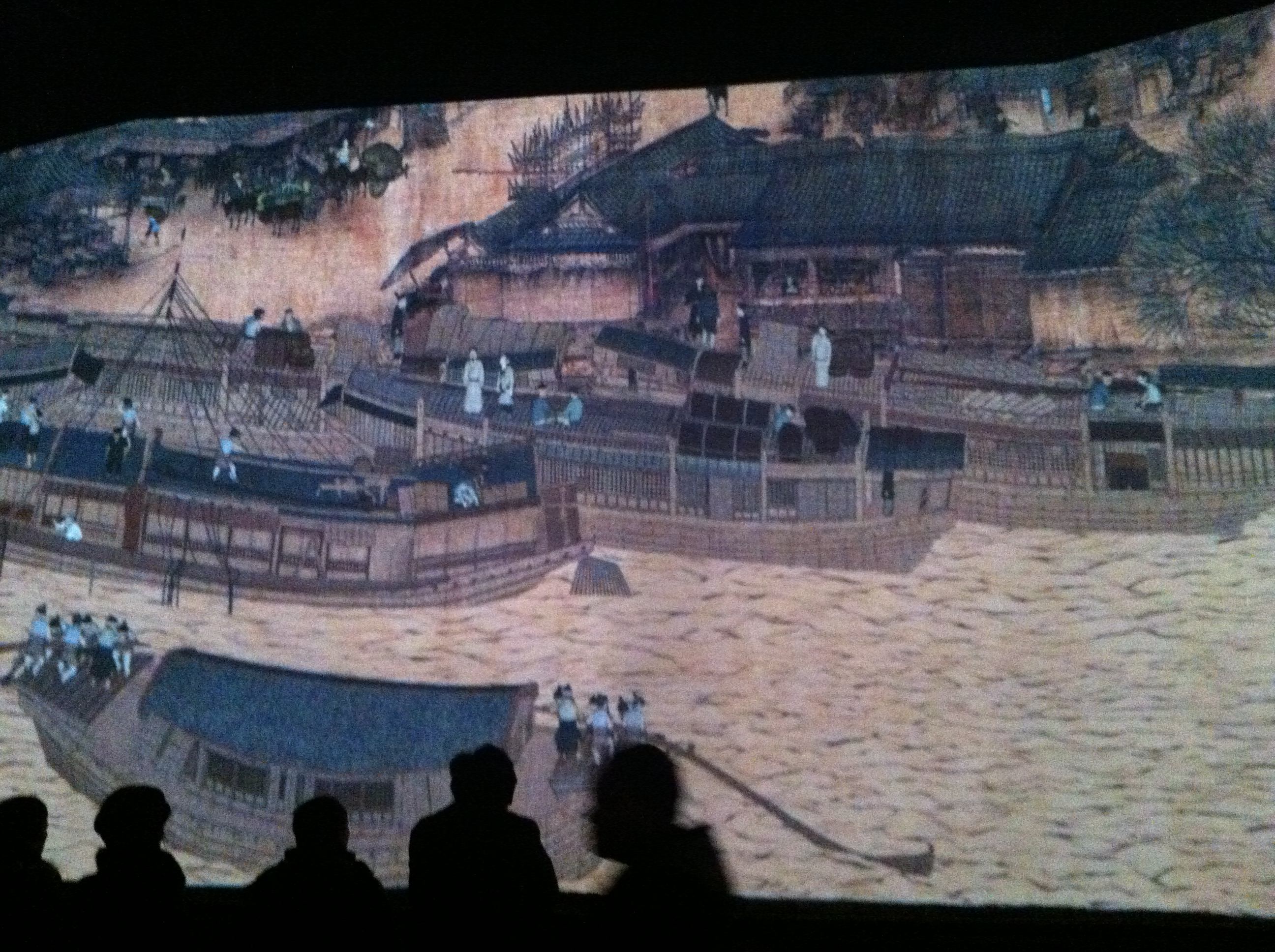
Animated version of the Riverside Scene at Qingming Festival

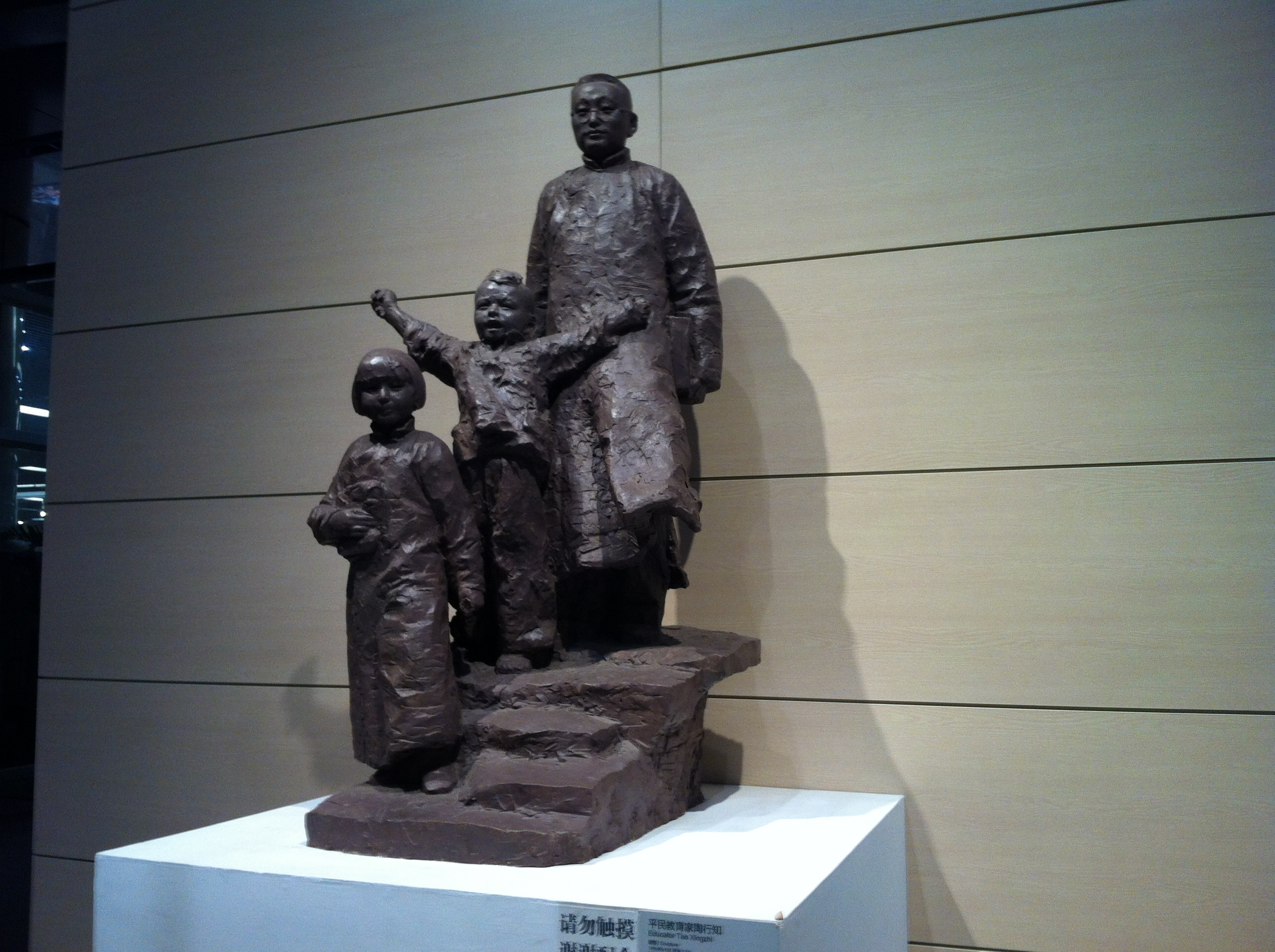
Tao Xingzhi sculpture

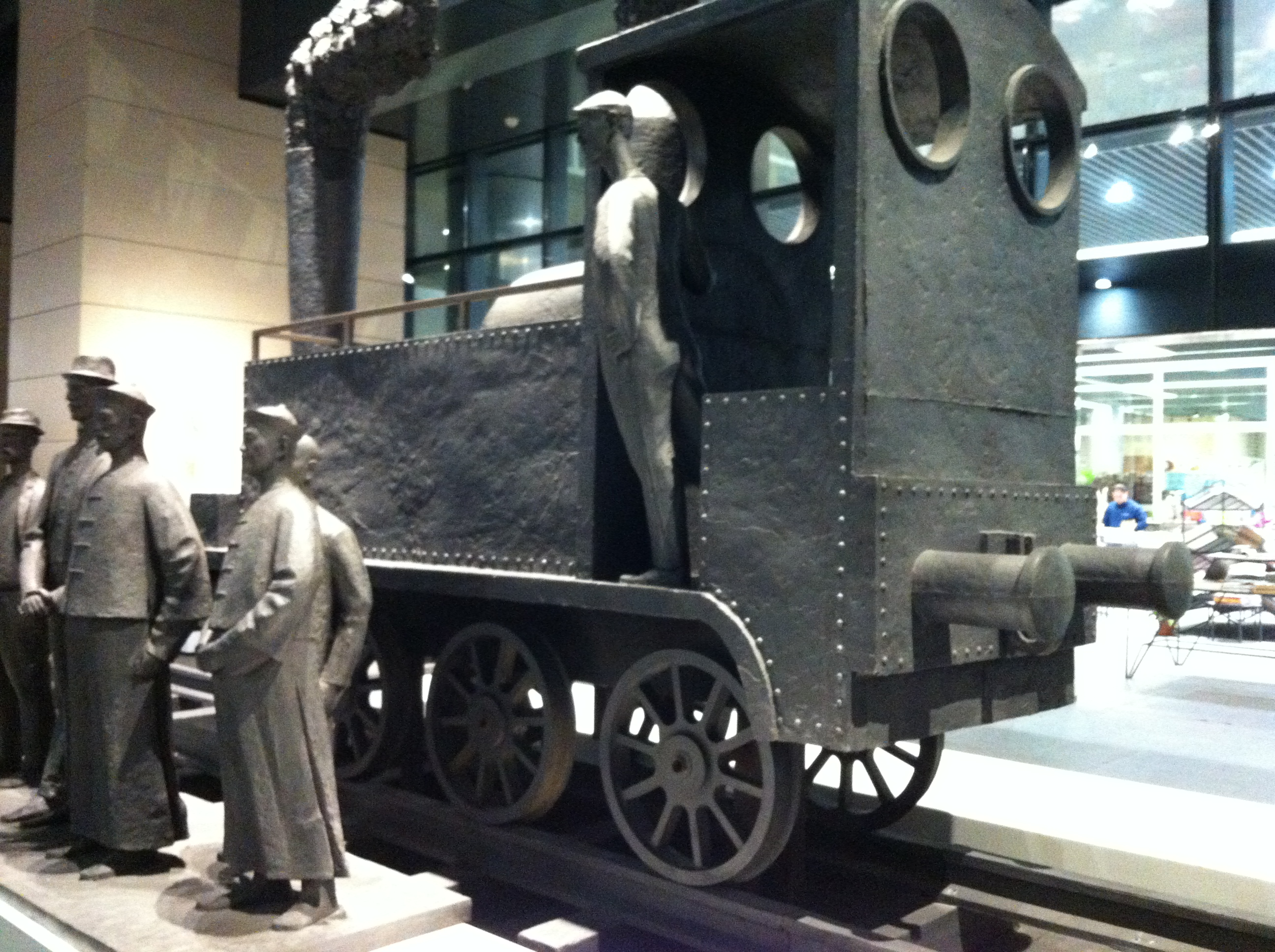
A train sculpture

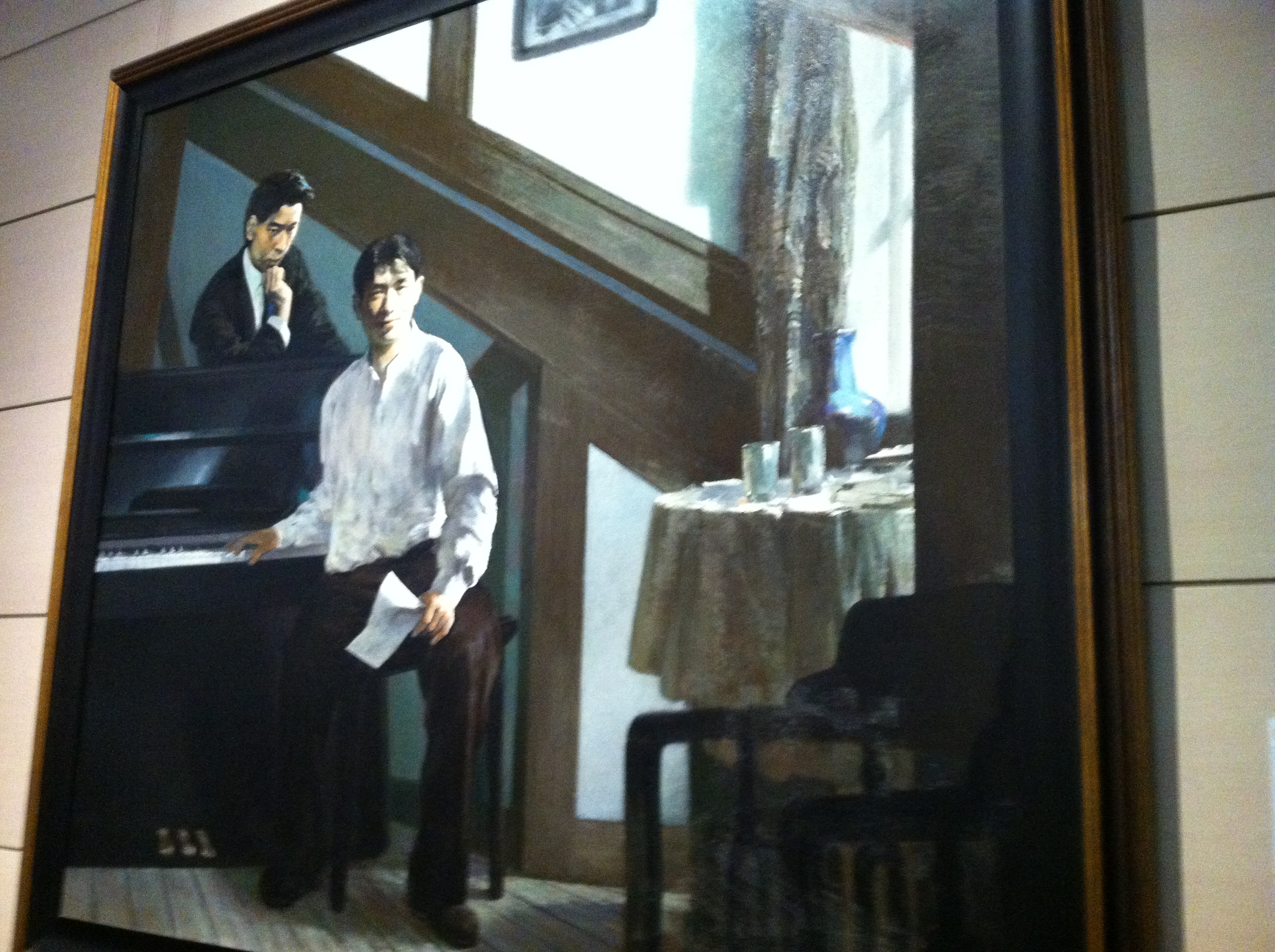
Nie Er and Tian Han, an oil painting work.

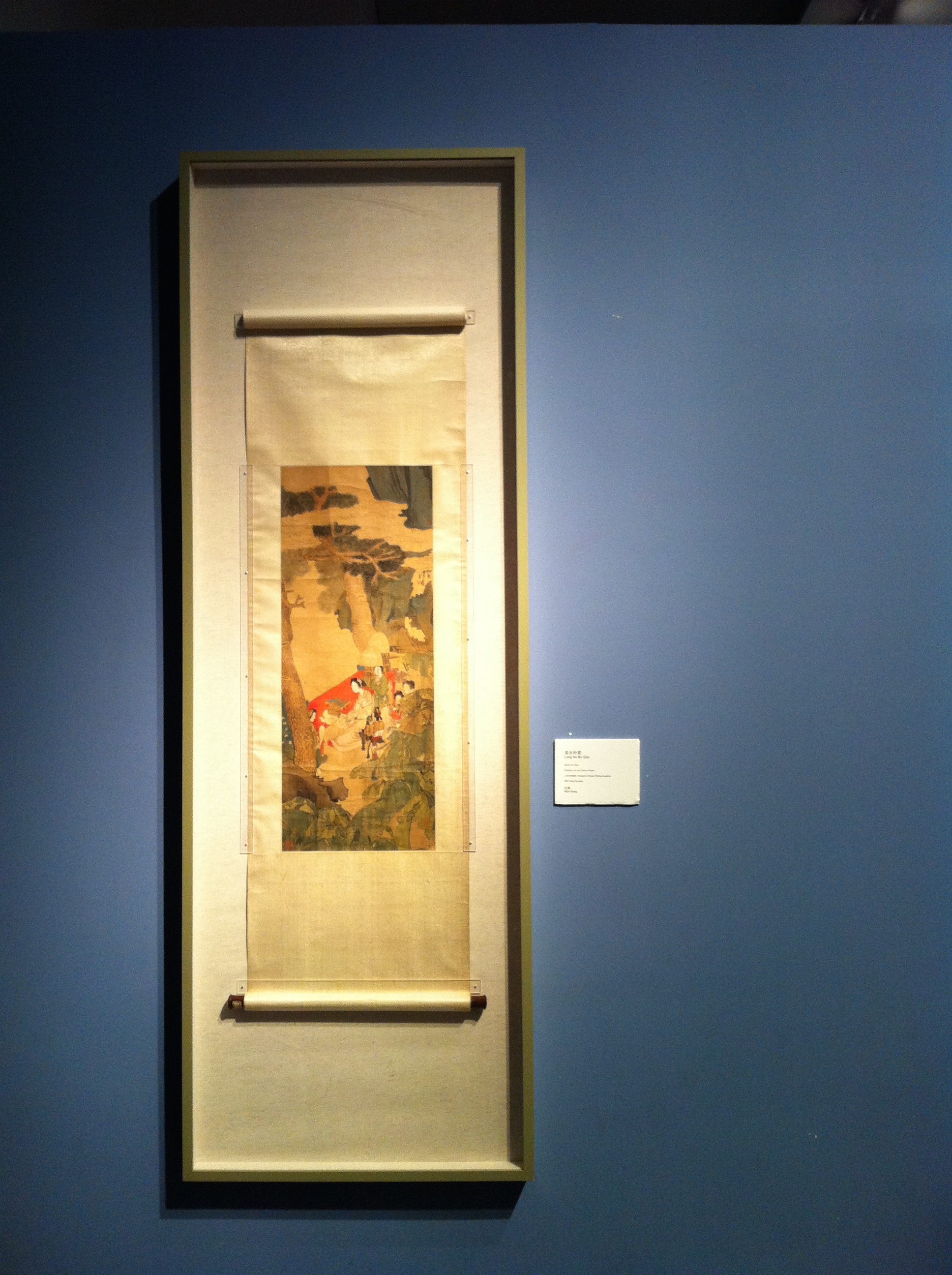

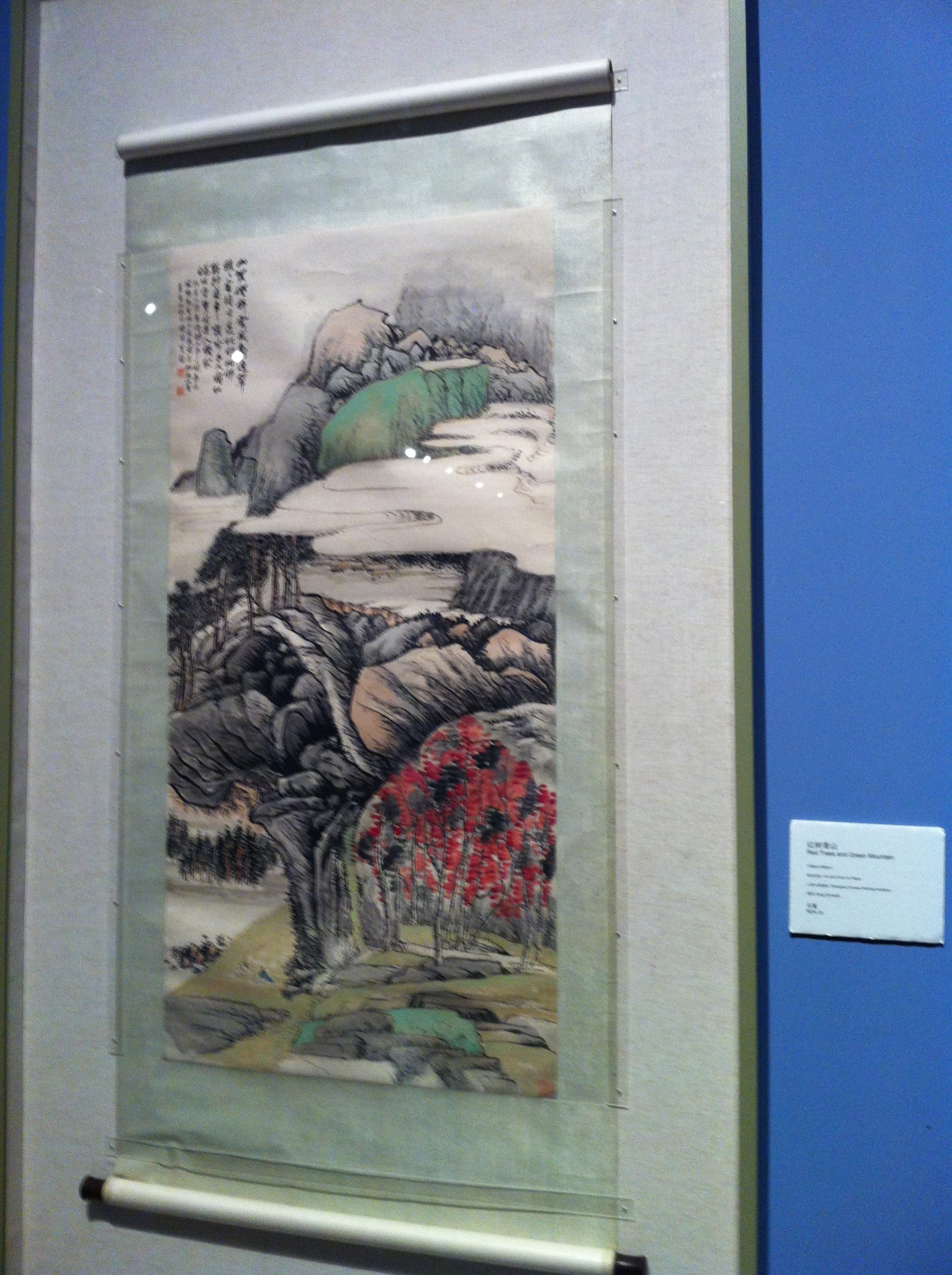

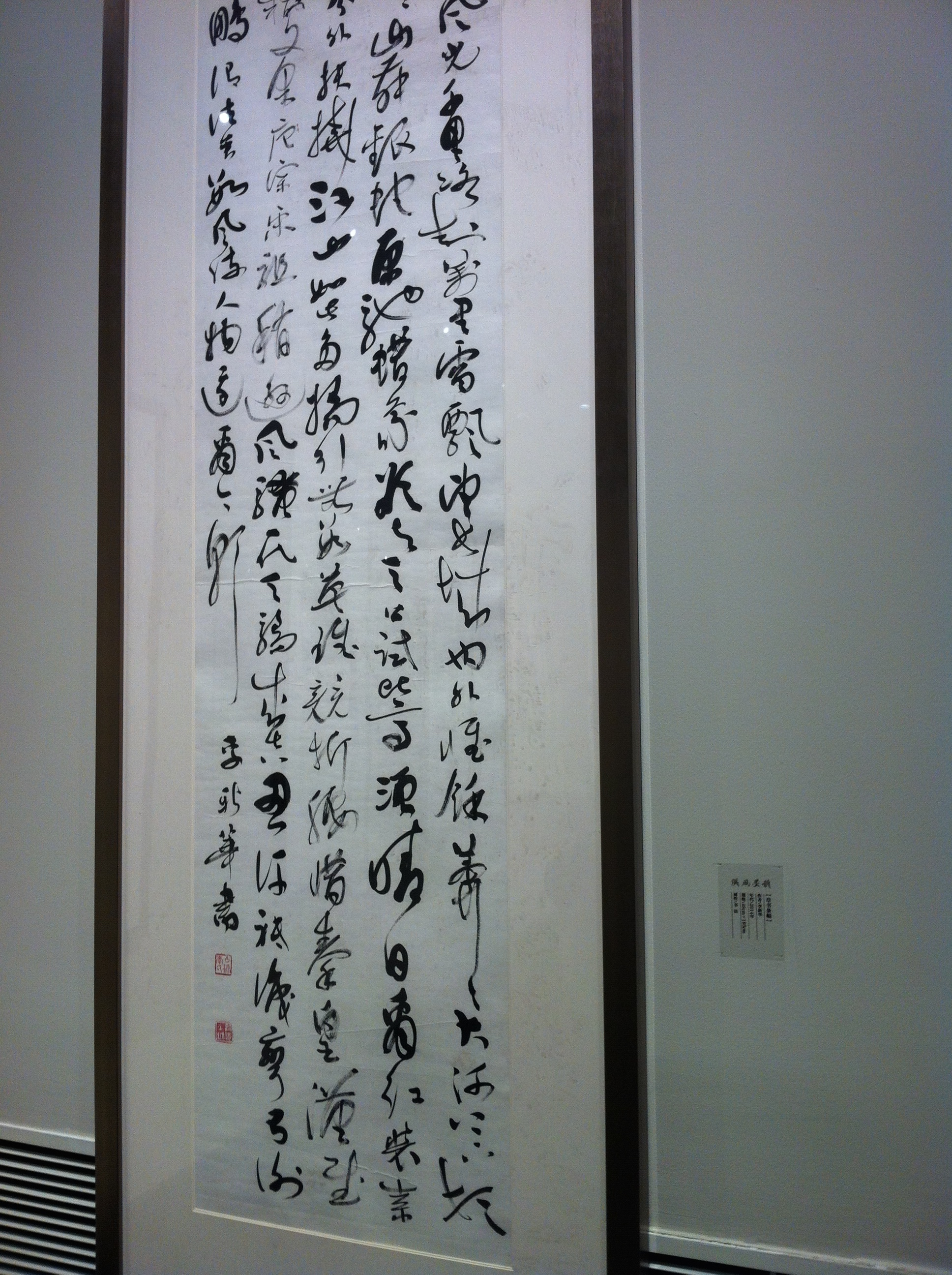

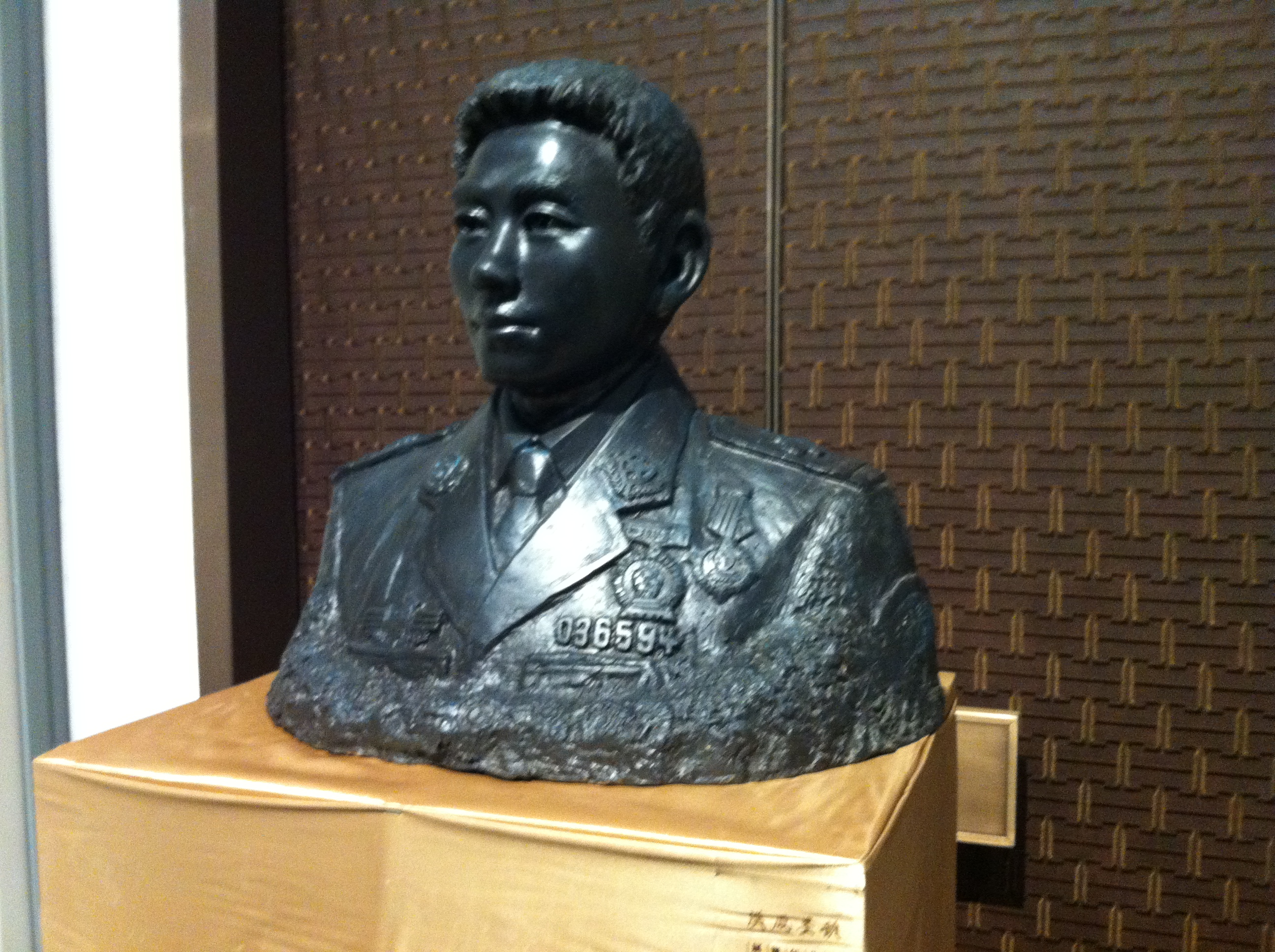
A policeman sculpture

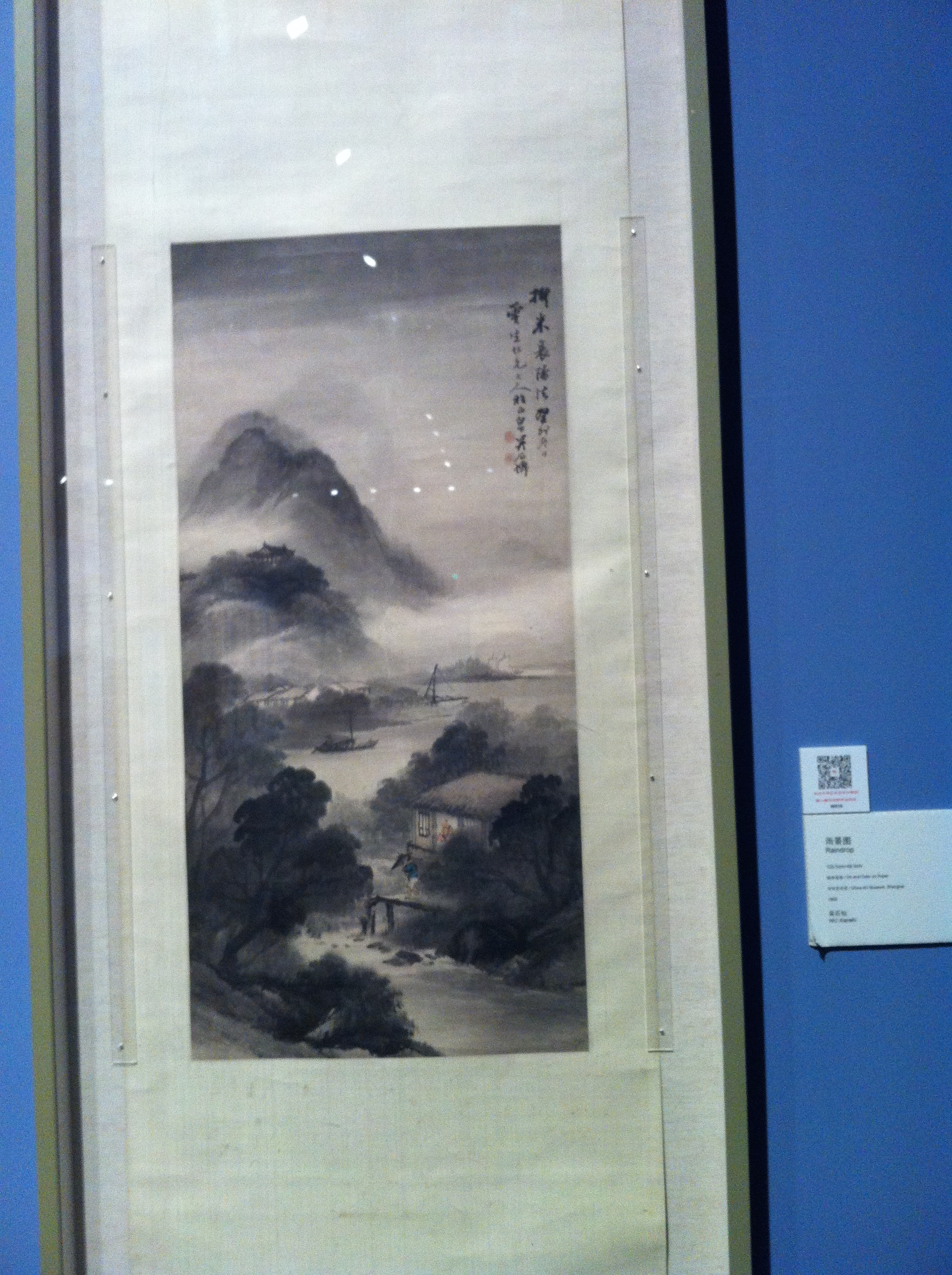

== Visiting ==
The museum is located at 205 Shangnan Road in Pudong, Shanghai. It has an adjacent metro station on Shanghai Metro Line 8. It is also accessible via Yaohua Road Station on Line 7 and Line 8, and more than a dozen bus lines.

Admissions are free except for special exhibitions, which cost 20 yuan. The museum is closed on Mondays, except for national holidays. In the first year of its operation, the China Art Museum received nearly 2 million visitors.
