= Guangxiao Temple =

Guangxiao Temple may refer to:

- Guangxiao Temple (Guangzhou), in Guangzhou, Guangdong, China
- Guangxiao Temple (Putian), in Putian, Fujian, China
