= Songjiang Square Pagoda =

Buddhist pagoda in Shanghai, China

Coordinates: 31°00′23″N 121°14′30″E

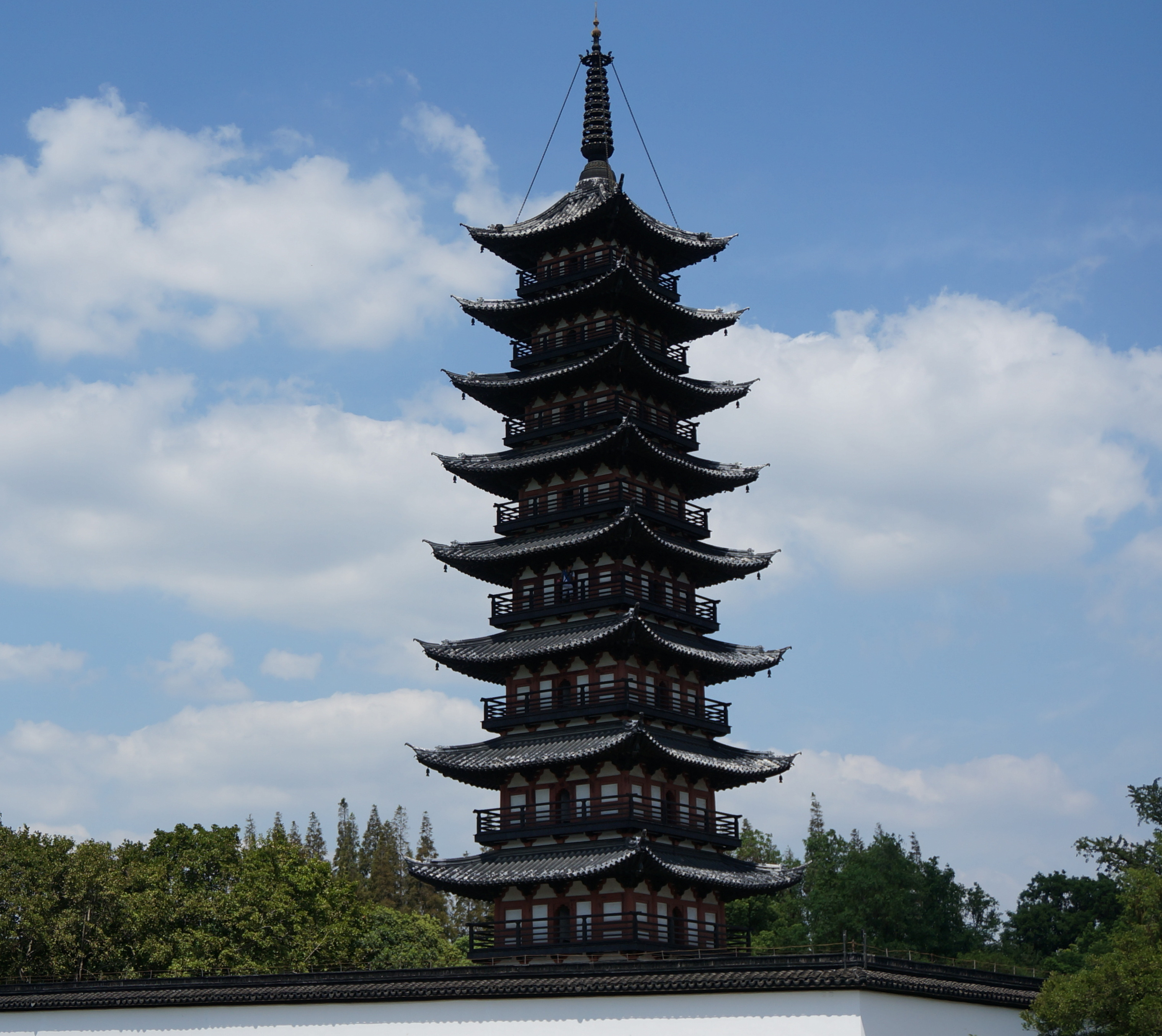
- Chinese: 松江方塔
- Literal meaning: Songjiang Square Pagoda
Transcriptions
Standard Mandarin
- Hanyu Pinyin: Sōngjiāng Fāngtǎ

Xingshengjiao Temple Pagoda
- Traditional Chinese: 興聖教寺塔
- Simplified Chinese: 兴圣教寺塔
- Literal meaning: Xingshengjiao Temple Pagoda
Transcriptions
Standard Mandarin
- Hanyu Pinyin: Xīngshèngjiào Sì Tǎ

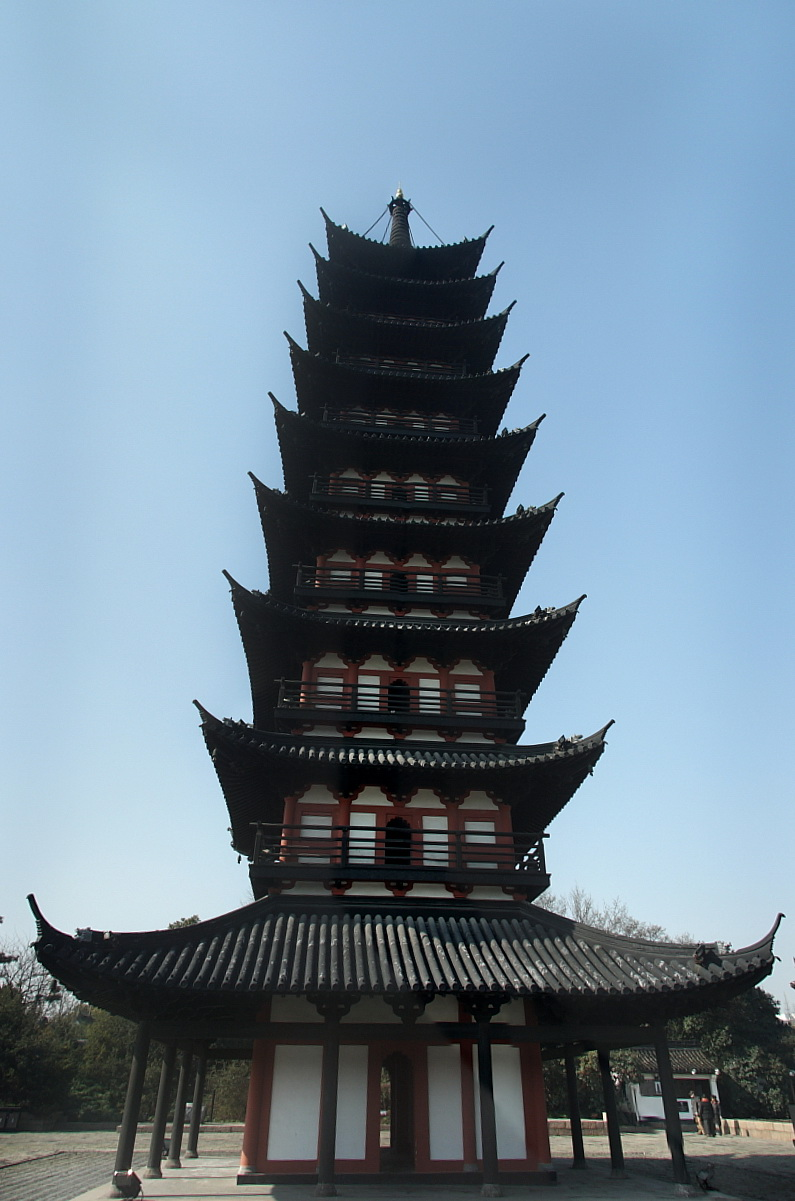
The Square Pagoda in 2010

The Songjiang Square Pagoda or Songjiang Fangta, officially the Xingshengjiao Temple Pagoda, is a Buddhist pagoda in the old town of Songjiang in suburban Shanghai. Originally built in the 11th century, it is the only structure remaining from the Xingshengjiao Temple, and is now enclosed in the Fangta Park. The 9-story pagoda is 48.5 meters (159 ft) tall, and it has become Songjiang's most famous landmark.

== History ==
The pagoda was built between 1068 and 1077, when Songjiang was the largest city in the Shanghai region, a prosperous stop on the Grand Canal between Hangzhou and Suzhou. Each side of the ground floor is about 6 meters (20 ft) long, and its nine stories reach 48.5 meters (159 ft) high. It formed part of Songjiang's Xingshengjiao Temple, originally established in 949 but now completely destroyed. Its Northern Song style has not changed despite renovations under the Ming and Qing and, more recently, in the mid- to late 1970s. In 1974, its first-floor staircase was restored.

In 1974 or 1975, a brick vault was discovered under the pagoda during renovations. It was the tomb of the 11th-century monk Miaoyuan (妙遠) whose ashes—as was common of other masters during the Northern Song—had been placed within the hollow belly of the enlightened Buddha to serve as an object of veneration. The bronze reclining Buddha was 42 centimeters (17 in) long and more than 25 kilograms (55 lb). Two elephant teeth and seven relic beads were placed neatly nearby in two silver cases. The Buddha and the silver cases had been stored in a lacquer case, which had been placed in a larger stone one and then stored in an undecorated crypt.

The Square Pagoda is the centerpiece of the modern city's Fangta Park, which was organized in 1980 by Feng Jizhong as one of the first reassertions of the importance of traditional Chinese architecture after the ravages of the Cultural Revolution. It was added to Shanghai's nationally-protected sites (as No. 83-5) in 1996 and is now Songjiang's most famous landmark.

== See also ==
- Other Square Pagodas
