= Cheng Shifa =

Chinese cartoonist (1921–2007)

Cheng Shifa (Chinese: 程十髮; pinyin: Chéng Shífà; 1921 – June 17, 2007) was a Chinese calligrapher, painter, and cartoonist.

Cheng was born in a small Chinese village outside the city of Shanghai in 1921, in modern Fengjing township. He originally studied medicine before deciding to focus on art. He graduated from Shanghai Art College in 1941. Cheng staged his first art show in 1942.

Cheng was originally known as an illustrator. He initially gained attention for illustrating short stories for Lu Xun, who is considered to be one of the 20th century's best known Chinese satirists. However, Cheng ultimately became best known for his traditional brush paintings of minority ethnic groups from Yunnan, a southwestern border province known for its ethnic diversity. Cheng's work stressed the unity and connection between different ethnic groups, winning Cheng awards from the government.

Cheng Shifa was exposed to Chinese painting and calligraphy at an early age, but he was more impressed by folk art than by Chinese painting, graduating from the Chinese Painting Department of the Shanghai Fine Arts College in 1941, and holding a solo exhibition at the Shanghai Daxin Company in 1942. After 1949, he was engaged in art popularization work. In 1952, he joined the Shanghai People's Fine Arts Publishing House (East China People's Fine Arts Publishing House) as a creative writer, and in 1956, he took part in the preparatory work for the Shanghai Painting Academy and served as a painter. Since then, his artistic vision has been expanding, "taking the ancient and modern Chinese and foreign methods and transforming them", and he is unique in figures, flowers and birds. He also has attainments in comic strips, yearbooks, illustrations and illustrations. He is also an expert in calligraphy, which is inspired by the wooden slips of the Qin and Han dynasties. His paintings were influenced by Chen Laolian in his early years, and in his later years, the artist mostly painted birds and flowers.

== Works and Awards ==
Works by Cheng Shifa Lenin in 1918, The Story of Lenin, The Gallows Sword, Painted Skin, Old Sun Returns to the Society, and Kong Yi Ji. The illustrations of The History of Confucianism were awarded the Silver Prize at the Leipzig International Bookbinding Exhibition in 1959. Kong Yi Ji" won the Second Prize of the First National Comic Strip Painting Award.

== Paintings ==
Based on the poem of the same name by Du Fu, a great poet of the Tang Dynasty, but taking the meaning of the line "The weather is new on the third day of March, and there are many beautiful people by the water in Chang'an", "The Walk of the Lillies" focuses on the portrayal of several young women's love for beauty and the soothing state of mind of a clear sky when they are traveling in the spring, cherishing the spring, and falling in love with the spring. Among the traditional Chinese characters, Zhong Kui is one that Cheng Shifa never tires of painting. He once said, "Zhong Kui is me." However, his Zhong Kui is different from those of other painters: kind, humorous, witty, idle, and devoid of anger and authority. Welcome Spring" was painted on New Year's Day, 1983, at the invitation of Wen Wei Po. Mr. skilful techniques to paint a big fat pig, pig back sitting on a young girl lifting the flower smile to welcome the arrival of the new year. The young girl has a beautiful face, her expression is both focused and delicate, her face is full of happiness and peace. Mr. Chen has skillfully arranged the pig in the picture, and the spring flowers in the girl's hand vividly depicts the theme of the painting.

Cheng died at a hospital in Shanghai on June 17, 2007, of an undisclosed illness.

== Anecdote ==
Born into a family of physicians in Songjiang, near Shanghai, Cheng Shifa began studying traditional painting at Shanghai Art College in 1938. After the liberation he became a successful illustrator of children's books and taught at the Shanghai Chinese Painting Academy, where he developed an eclectic style that combined traditional brushwork with Western drawing techniques using a pen.

Cheng is best known for his figural subjects, but this album, entitled In Search of the Delightful, shows off his broad command of subjects and techniques. A number of the leaves openly celebrate the 1976 downfall of Jiang Qing, Mao Zedong's notorious wife and leader of the Gang of Four, which strictly controlled culture. The Monkey-King Beats the White-Boned Demon depicts the beloved hero of the epic Journey to the West and intrepid defender of the faithful attacking the White-Boned Demon, to whom Jiang Qing was often compared.
