= Nanjing Road (disambiguation) =

Nanjing Road is a road in Shanghai.

Nanjing Road may also refer to

- Nanjing Road (Taipei)
  - Nanjing East Road Station in Taipei
- East Nanjing Road Station in Shanghai
- West Nanjing Road Station in Shanghai
