= Century Avenue =

Street in Shanghai, China

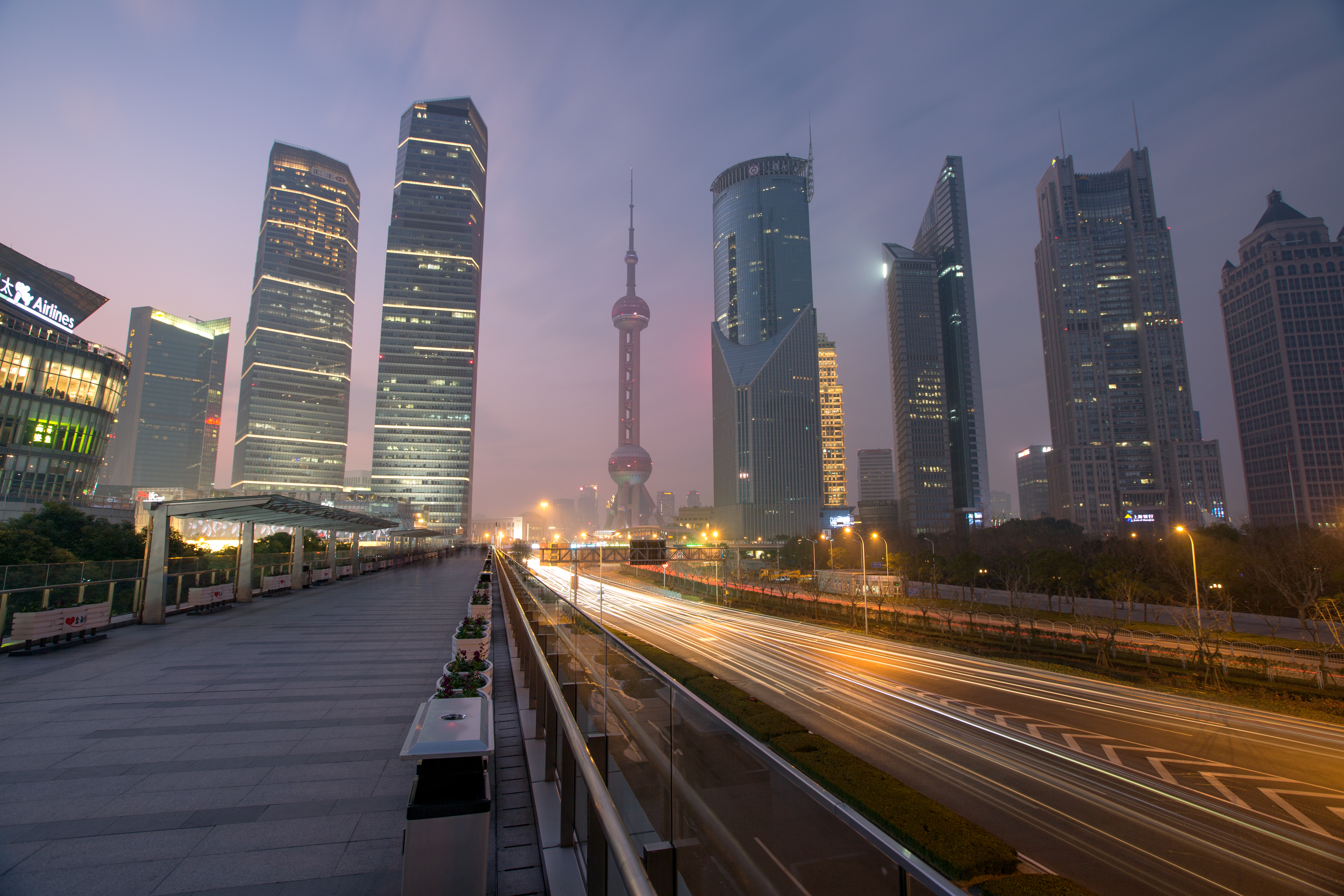
Century Avenue near Lujiazui in January 2016

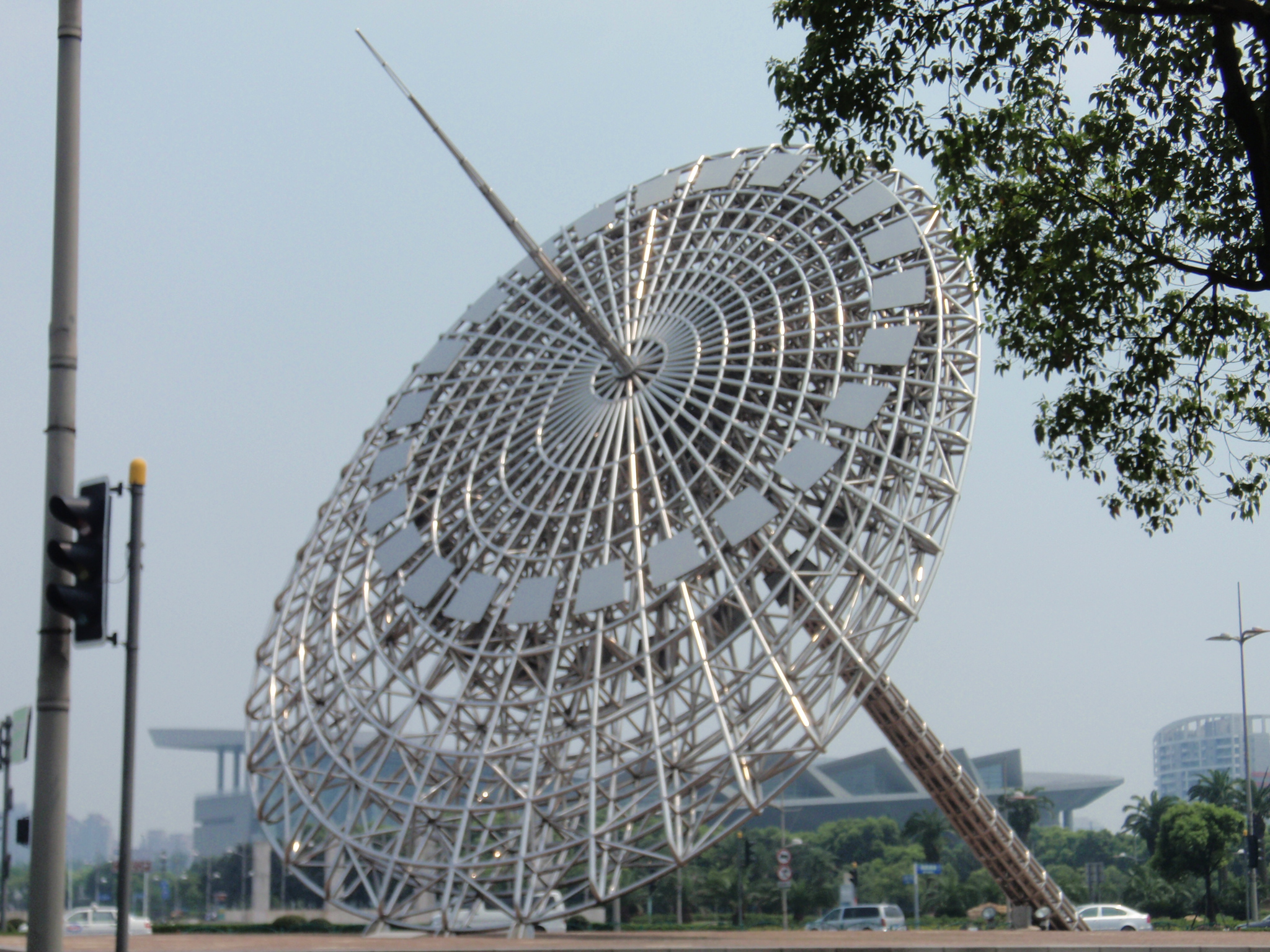
Oriental Light

Century Avenue (Chinese: 世纪大道; pinyin: Shìjì Dàdào) is a major street in Pudong, Shanghai. It starts near the Oriental Pearl Tower and ends at Century Park, with a length of 5 kilometres (3.1 mi). The road opened in 2000.

== Major Landmarks ==
There are many major landmarks along the road (from west to east):

- Lujiazui
- Jin Mao Tower
- Shanghai World Financial Center
- NYU Shanghai
- Shanghai Oriental Art Center
- Shanghai Science and Technology Museum
- Century Park

== Metro stations ==
Shanghai Metro Line 2 follows Century Avenue for the entire length of the road. It is accessible through the following stations (from west to east):

- Lujiazui
- Dongchang Road
- Century Avenue
- Shanghai Science and Technology Museum
