= Loushanguan Road station =

Shanghai Metro station

Loushanguan Road 娄山关路
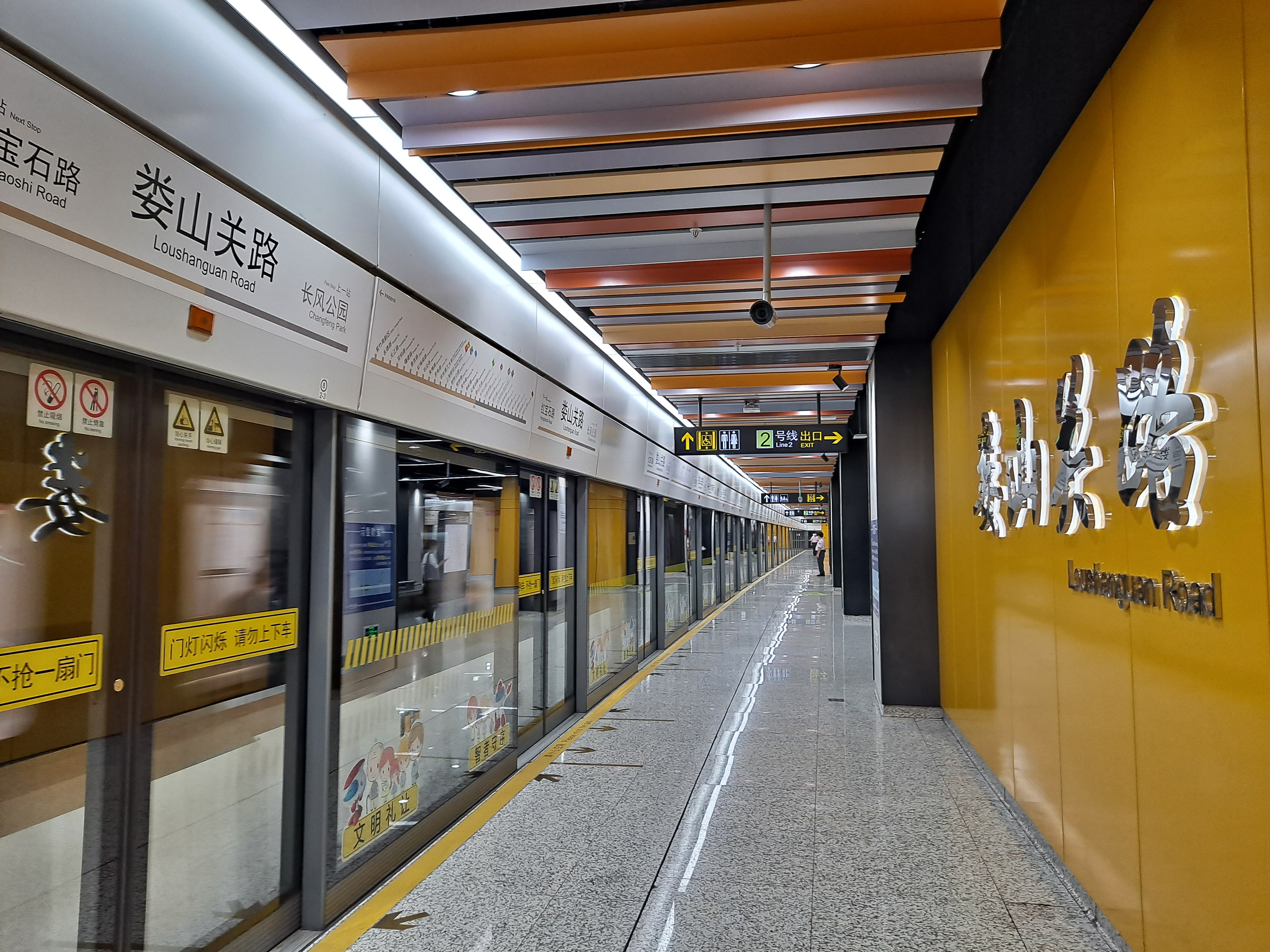
- L15 Station platform

General information
- Location: Tianshan Road (天山路) and Loushanguan Road (娄山关路); Changning District, Shanghai; China
- Coordinates: 31°12′40″N 121°24′15″E
- Operator: Shanghai No. 2 Metro Operation Co. Ltd.
- Lines: Line 2; Line 15
- Platforms: 4 (2 island platforms)
- Tracks: 4

Construction
- Structure type: Underground
- Accessible: Yes

History
- Opened: 30 December 2006 (Line 2); 23 January 2021 (Line 15)

Services
Preceding station	Shanghai Metro	Following station
Weining Road towards Panxiang Road · Shanghai National Accounting Institute	Line 2	Zhongshan Park towards Pudong Airport Terminal 1&2
Changfeng Park towards Gucun Park	Line 15	Hongbaoshi Road towards Zizhu Hi-tech Park
Location
- Location within Shanghai

Loushanguan Road (Chinese: 娄山关路; pinyin: Lóushānguān Lù) is a station on Shanghai Metro Line 2 and Line 15. It is part of the western extension of line 2 from Zhongshan Park to Songhong Road that opened on 30 December 2006. It became an interchange station with the opening of line 15 on 23 January 2021.

Up until 31 December 2024, passengers interchanging between lines 15 and 2 at Loushanguan Road Station had to walk from station to station, because work on the underground passage hasn’t been completed. Those who pay with public transportation cards or through the official Metro app avoid additional fees when transferring. However, the underground passage has opened on 31 December 2024 and now takes approximately 9 minutes to traverse.

== Location ==
The station is located between the Weining Road station and the Zhongshan Park station on Shanghai Metro Line 2. The station is located beneath the intersection of Loushanguan Road and Tianshan Road, along which the line runs. The station is located roughly between the Shanghai Hongqiao International Airport and the Huangpu River.

== Station layout ==
1F	Ground level	Exits 1-3, 6-7
1F	Exit 5 concourse	Exits 5, Tickets, Service Center
B1	Line 2 concourse	Tickets, Service Center
B1	Transfer channel	Exit 4, Tickets, Service Center, Restrooms
B2	Platform 1	← Line 2 towards Panxiang Road · Shanghai National Accounting Institute (Weining Road)
B2	Island platform, doors open on the left
B2	Platform 2	Line 2 towards Pudong Airport Terminal 1&2 (Zhongshan Park) →
B2	Line 15 concourse	Tickets, Service Center
B3	Platform 4	← Line 15 towards Gucun Park (Changfeng Park)
B3	Island platform, doors open on the left
B3	Platform 3	Line 15 towards Zizhu Hi-tech Park (Hongbaoshi Road) →
