= Line 2 (Shanghai Metro) =

Metro line of the Shanghai Metro

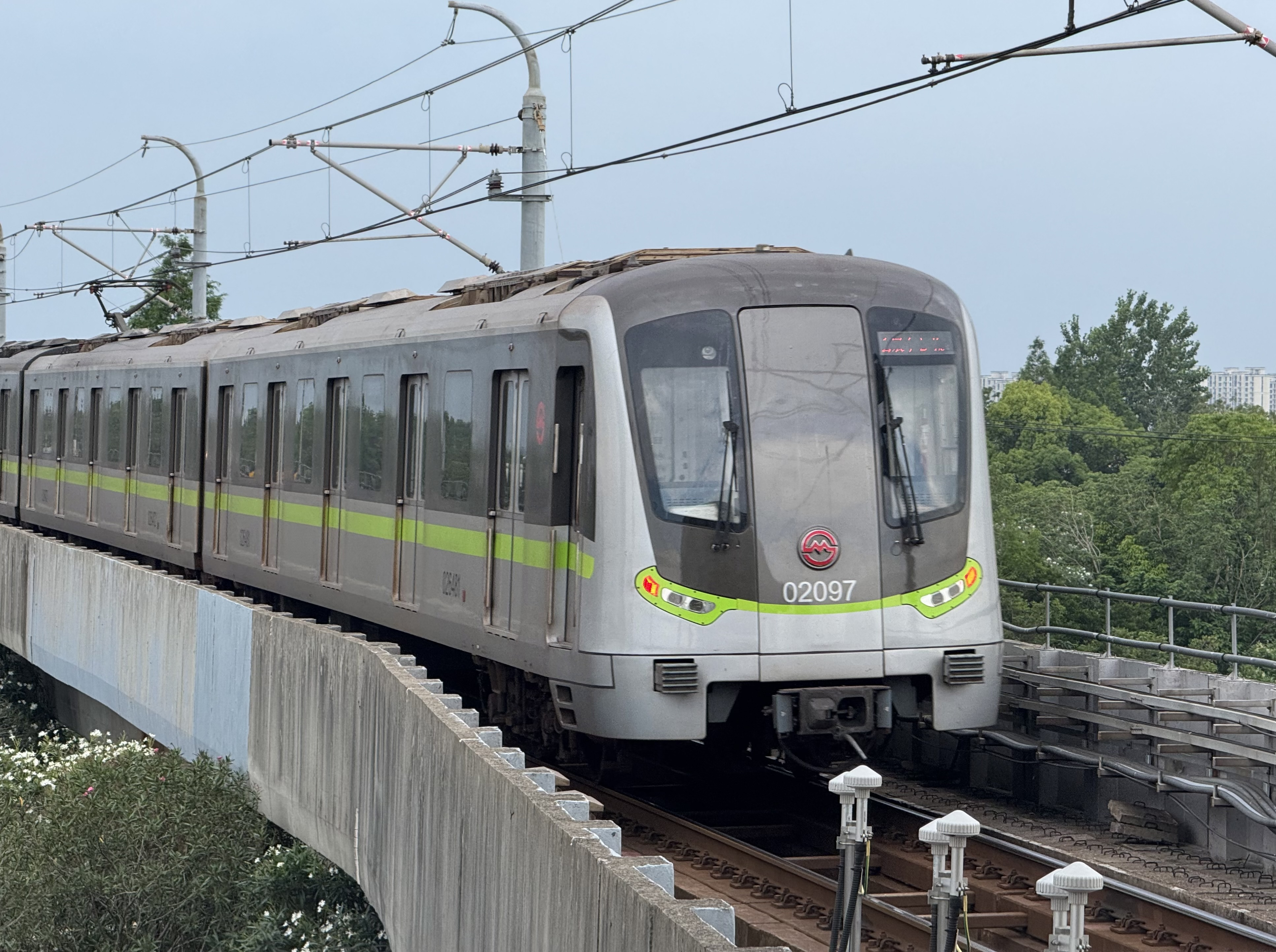
- 02A05 train departing from Yuandong Avenue station

Overview
- Other names: R2 (planned name); Changning line (Chinese: 长宁线)
- Native name: 上海地铁2号线
- Status: Operational
- Owner: Shanghai Rail Transit Changning Line Development Co., Ltd. (West of Longyang Road); Shanghai Rail Transit Line 2 East Extension Development Co., Ltd. (East of Longyang Road)
- Locale: Pudong; Huangpu, Jing'an, Changning, Minhang, and Qingpu districts, Shanghai, China
- Termini: Panxiang Road · Shanghai National Accounting Institute; Pudong Airport Terminal 1&2
- Stations: 31
- Colour on map: Light Green (#82BF25)

Service
- Type: Rapid transit
- System: Shanghai Metro
- Operator(s): Shanghai No.2 Metro Operation Co., Ltd.
- Depot(s): Beidi Road Depot; Longyang Road Depot; Chuansha Yard
- Rolling stock: 02A01; 02A02; 02A03; 02A04; 02A05
- Daily ridership: 1.903 million (2019 Peak)

History
- Commenced: December 28, 1995; 30 years ago
- Opened: June 11, 2000; 25 years ago
- Last extension: November 1, 2025; 6 months ago

Technical
- Line length: 64 km (39.77 mi)
- Number of tracks: 2
- Character: Underground (Panxiang Road · Shanghai National Accounting Institute - Yuandong Avenue, except Zhangjiang High Technology Park - Longyang Road) and elevated (Yuandong Avenue - Pudong Airport Terminal 1&2)
- Track gauge: 1,435 mm (4 ft 8 1/2 in)
- Electrification: Overhead lines (1500 volts)
- Operating speed: 80 km/h (50 mph); Average speed: 37.3 km/h (23 mph)
- Signalling: US&S United Signal AF900 (ATO/GOA2) and CASCO Tranavi (DTO/GOA3)
Route map
Route on the Shanghai map:
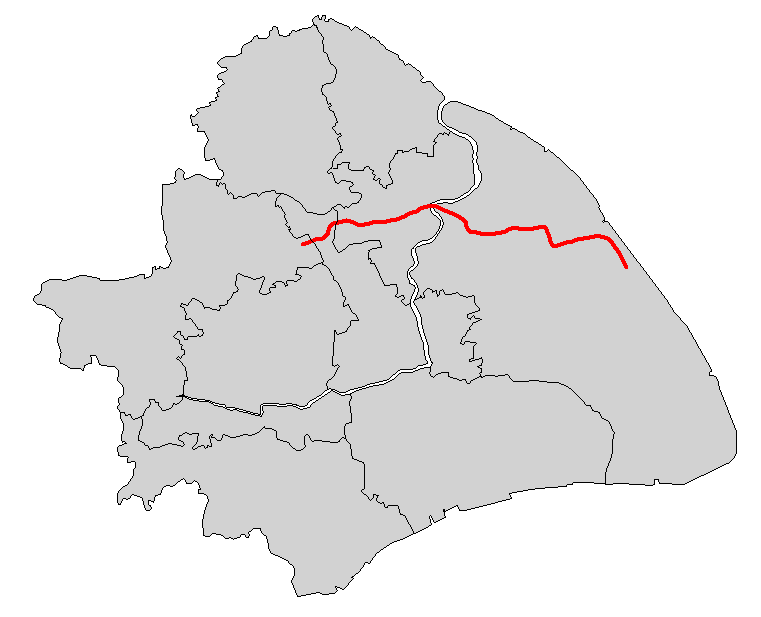
To scale geographic map:

Line 2 is an east–west line in the Shanghai Metro network. With a length of nearly 64 km (40 mi), it is the second longest line in the metro system after line 11. Line 2 runs from Panxiang Road · Shanghai National Accounting Institute station in the west to Pudong Airport Terminal 1&2 in the east, passing Hongqiao Airport, the Huangpu river, and the Lujiazui Financial District in Pudong. With a daily ridership of over 1.9 million, it is the busiest line on the Shanghai Metro. The eastern portion of the line, Guanglan Road - Pudong International Airport section, was operated as an independent service route until April 19, 2019, when through service began. The line is colored light green on system maps.

== History ==
The first section of line 2 was opened on October 28, 1999, from Zhongshan Park to Longyang Road. This section, which included 12 stations, totaled 16.3 kilometres (10.1 mi). A year later coinciding with the tenth anniversary of the development and opening up of Pudong, marking the official opening of the line, Zhangjiang High Technology Park was added to the eastern part of the line, adding 2.8 kilometres (1.7 mi). Four new stations, located west of the Zhongshan Park station, opened in December 2006, extending the line to Songhong Road. This section added 6.15 kilometres (3.82 mi) to the line. Four years later, in preparation for the 2010 Shanghai World Expo, the line was significantly expanded. In February, the Zhangjiang High Technology Park station was rebuilt. In addition, another eastern segment took line 2 to Guanglan Road. A month later, the line was extended westward to East Xujing, adding 8.0 kilometres (5.0 mi) to the line including a stop at Hongqiao Airport Terminal 2. On April 8, an eastward extension added 8 stations to the line, totaling 26.6 kilometres (16.5 mi) and taking line 2 to Pudong International Airport. On July 1, Hongqiao Railway Station opened to the public with the opening of the railway station of the same name.

In October 2006, it was decided to rename three stations on line 2 by the end of the year, adopting a new naming scheme: metro stations, unlike bus stops, are no longer supposed to be named after neighbouring vertical streets, but famous streets and sights in the vicinity, making it easier for visitors to find these places. The renamed stations are Century Avenue (formerly Dongfang Road), East Nanjing Road (formerly Middle Henan Road) and West Nanjing Road (formerly Shimen No. 1 Road).

Shanghai Metro Line 2 opening history
Segment	Commencement	Opened	Length	Station(s)	Name	Investment
Zhongshan Park — Longyang Road	28 Dec 1995	20 Sep 1999	16.4 km (10.19 mi)	12	Initial phase	¥12.4 billion
Longyang Road — Zhangjiang High Technology Park	15 Jan 1999	26 Dec 2000	2.8 km (1.74 mi)	1	Initial phase (eastern section)	¥12.4 billion
Songhong Road — Zhongshan Park	15 Dec 2001	30 Dec 2006	6.8 km (4.23 mi)	4	First western extension	¥3.46842 billion
Zhangjiang High Technology Park — Guanglan Road	30 Jun 2006	24 Feb 2010	3.4 km (2.11 mi)	2	Eastern extension (1st section)	See Eastern extension (2nd section)
East Xujing — Songhong Road	17 Jul 2008	16 Mar 2010	8.6 km (5.34 mi)	2	Second western extension	¥2.5 billion
Guanglan Road — Pudong International Airport	18 Nov 2005	8 Apr 2010	26.8 km (16.65 mi)	8	Eastern extension (2nd section)	¥11.032 billion
Hongqiao Railway Station	4 Dec 2007	1 Jul 2010	Infill station	1	Hongqiao Comprehensive Transportation Hub	See second western extension
National Exhibition and Convention Center — Panxiang Road · Shanghai National Accounting Institute	28 Jun 2021	1 Nov 2025	1.67 km (1.04 mi)	1	Third western extension	¥2.23 billion

Up to April 19, 2019, when an eight-car train started serving the whole line 2 in a regular schedule, the east section of line 2 was served by a four-car fleet. Line 2 had a piecewise service pattern during morning peak hours whereby the suburban segment between Guanglan Road station and Pudong International Airport station (Now Pudong Airport Terminal 1&2 station) is partially served by a four-car fleet in addition to the regular eight-car fleet serving the whole line. Already since 28 December 2018, during off-peak times, an eight-car fleet from National Exhibition and Convention Center station or Songhong Road station may terminate at Pudong Airport Terminal 1&2 station, but most trains still terminate at Guanglan Road station or Tangzhen (only during peak hours).

== Stations ==
=== Service routes ===
Shanghai Metro Line 2 service routes
As of November 2025: M - Mainline: Panxiang Road · Shanghai National Accounting Institute ↔ Pudong Airport Terminal 1&2 (Note: During extended operations on Friday and Saturday after 23:00 terminates at Guanglan Road instead of Pudong Airport Terminal 1&2.); P1 - Partial mode 1: National Exhibition and Convention Center ↔ Guanglan Road; P2 - Partial mode 2: Songhong Road ↔ Guanglan Road; E - Evening trains: Hongqiao Railway Station → Longyang Road (limited stops) (Note: On Sunday to Thursday, there are two trains taking passengers from Hongqiao Railway Station (at 23:04 and 23:30) and airport after normal operation time and only stop at selected stations.)
Routes				Station name		Connections	Distance			Location	Opening	Platform
M	P1	P2	E	English	Chinese	Connections	km		min	Location	Opening	Platform
●				Panxiang Road · Shanghai National Accounting Institute	蟠祥路·国家会计学院		1.67			Qingpu	1 Nov 2025	Underground island
●	●			National Exhibition and Convention Center (Note: Was East Xujing (徐泾东))	国家会展中心	17 (Note: The station name of line 17 was Zhuguang Road (诸光路). Although it's de jure defined as out-of-system transfer station, virtual transfer via cards isn't available until open of the station of line 13, but after that day, the in-system transfer will be implemented instead.)	0.00		0	Qingpu	16 March 2010	Underground island
●	●		●	Hongqiao Railway Station	虹桥火车站	10 17; AOH	2.13		3	Minhang	1 July 2010	Underground; Two islands (shared 17 )
●	●		●	Hongqiao Airport Terminal 2	虹桥2号航站楼	10; Airport Link (Note: Virtual transfer with line 10 – passengers who hold the Shanghai Public Transportation Card and transfer within 30 minutes of exiting the station are able to transfer to other lines without exiting the system. In-system cross-platform interchange available between eastbound trains toward Pudong Airport Terminal 1&2 and Jilong Road. However, with the help of spanish solution for platforms, it's the de facto case that westbound passengers of both lines 2 and 10 may transfer in-system by acrossing train doors. Out-of-system transfer with Airport Link Line.); SHA	0.51	2.64	5	Minhang	16 March 2010	Underground; Two islands (Note: One island platform serves both eastbound and westbound line 2 trains. Another platform serves eastbound line 2 towards Pudong International Airport trains and eastbound line 10 towards Jilong Road trains (allowing cross-platform interchange).)
●	●	●	◒	Songhong Road	淞虹路		5.69	8.33	12	Changning	30 Dec 2006	Underground island
●	●	●	↓	Beixinjing	北新泾		1.40	9.73	15	Changning	30 Dec 2006	Underground island
●	●	●	↓	Weining Road	威宁路		1.26	10.99	17	Changning	30 Dec 2006	Underground island
●	●	●	↓	Loushanguan Road	娄山关路	15	1.60	12.59	20	Changning	30 Dec 2006	Underground island
●	●	●	◒	Zhongshan Park	中山公园	3 4	1.68	14.27	23	Changning	20 Sep 1999	Underground island
●	●	●	↓	Jiangsu Road	江苏路	11	1.43	15.70	26	Changning	20 Sep 1999	Underground island
●	●	●	◒	Jing'an Temple	静安寺	7 14 Yan'an BRT	1.13	16.83	29	Jing'an	20 Sep 1999	Underground island
●	●	●	↓	West Nanjing Road	南京西路	12 13 (Note: Virtual transfer with line 12 or line 13 – passengers who hold the Shanghai Public Transportation Card and transfer within 30 minutes of exiting the station are able to transfer to other lines without exiting the system.)	1.82	18.65	31	Jing'an	20 Sep 1999	Underground island
●	●	●	◒	People's Square	人民广场	1 8	1.21	19.86	34	Huangpu	20 Sep 1999	Underground island
●	●	●	↓	East Nanjing Road	南京东路	10	1.14	21.00	36	Huangpu	20 Sep 1999	Underground island
●	●	●	↓	Lujiazui	陆家嘴	14	1.86	22.86	39	Pudong	20 Sep 1999	Underground island
●	●	●	↓	South Pudong Road (Note: Was Dongchang Road (东昌路))	浦东南路	14 (Note: Although it's de jure defined as out-of-system transfer station, virtual transfer via cards isn't available until open of the station of line 19, but after that day, the in-system transfer will be implemented instead.)	1.30	24.16	42	Pudong	20 Sep 1999	Underground island
●	●	●	◒	Century Avenue	世纪大道	4 6 9	1.27	25.43	44	Pudong	20 Sep 1999	Underground island
●	●	●	↓	Shanghai Science and Technology Museum	上海科技馆		1.81	27.24	47	Pudong	20 Sep 1999	Underground island
●	●	●	↓	Century Park	世纪公园		1.43	28.67	50	Pudong	20 Sep 1999	Underground island
●	●	●	◒	Longyang Road	龙阳路	7 16 18 Maglev (Note: Out-of-system transfer with Maglev line.)	1.09	29.76	52	Pudong	20 Sep 1999	Underground island
●	●	●		Zhangjiang High Technology Park	张江高科		2.67	32.43	56	Pudong	26 Dec 2000 (Note: Former station, in operation between 26 December 2000 and 14 February 2010. Current station opened 24 Feb 2010.)	Underground island
●	●	●		Jinke Road	金科路		1.64	34.07	58	Pudong	24 Feb 2010	Underground island
●	●	●		Guanglan Road	广兰路		1.95	36.02	62	Pudong	24 Feb 2010	Underground Side & Island
●				Tangzhen	唐镇		3.38	39.40	67	Pudong	8 April 2010	Underground island
●				Middle Chuangxin Road	创新中路		1.76	41.16	70	Pudong	8 April 2010	Underground Side platform
●				East Huaxia Road	华夏东路		2.13	43.29	73	Pudong	8 April 2010	Underground Side platform
●				Chuansha	川沙		3.17	46.46	78	Pudong	8 April 2010	Underground Side platform
●				Lingkong Road	凌空路		1.90	48.36	81	Pudong	8 April 2010	Underground Side platform
●				Yuandong Avenue	远东大道		3.11	51.47	86	Pudong	8 April 2010	Elevated island
●				Haitiansan Road	海天三路		5.91	57.38	93	Pudong	8 April 2010	Elevated island
●				Pudong Airport Terminal 1&2 (Note: Was Pudong International Airport (浦东国际机场))	浦东1号2号航站楼	Maglev; Airport Link (Note: Out-of-system transfer with both Maglev line and Airport Link line.); PVG	2.33	59.71	96	Pudong	8 April 2010	At-grade Side platform

=== Alignment ===
==== East Xujing to West Nanjing Road ====
The line begins at East Xujing at the intersection of Xumin East Road and Zhuguang Road. The line heads northeastward under Xumin East Road for about 0.8 kilometres (0.50 mi) before veering off the road and heading east, passing under Huaxiang Road. The line then enters the interchange station serving the Hongqiao Railway Station. This station is an interchange with Line 10 and Line 17. Shortly thereafter, the line enters the Hongqiao Airport Terminal 2. Line 2 then turns northward until it meets Tianshan Road and turns east again, roughly running parallel under Tianshan Road. Along this road, the line enters the Songhong Road, Beixinjing, and Weining Road stations. At the Loushanguan Road, line 2 veers away from Tianshan Road, heading northeastward. The line then enters the Zhongshan Park along Changning Road, an interchange with lines 3 and 4. The subway line then runs parallel under Changning Road for a short distance before heading east under Yuyuan Road. Along Yuyuan Road, there is a station at Jiangsu Road, an interchange to line 11. East of this station, the line swerves away from Yuyuan Road and runs under Yongyuan Road, which merges into West Nanjing Road, where line 2 enters the Jing'an Temple, an interchange to line 7. Just before entering the West Nanjing Road, the metro line veers away from West Nanjing Road to Wujiang Road. Line 2 comes back under the road shortly thereafter.

==== West Nanjing Road to Longyang Road ====
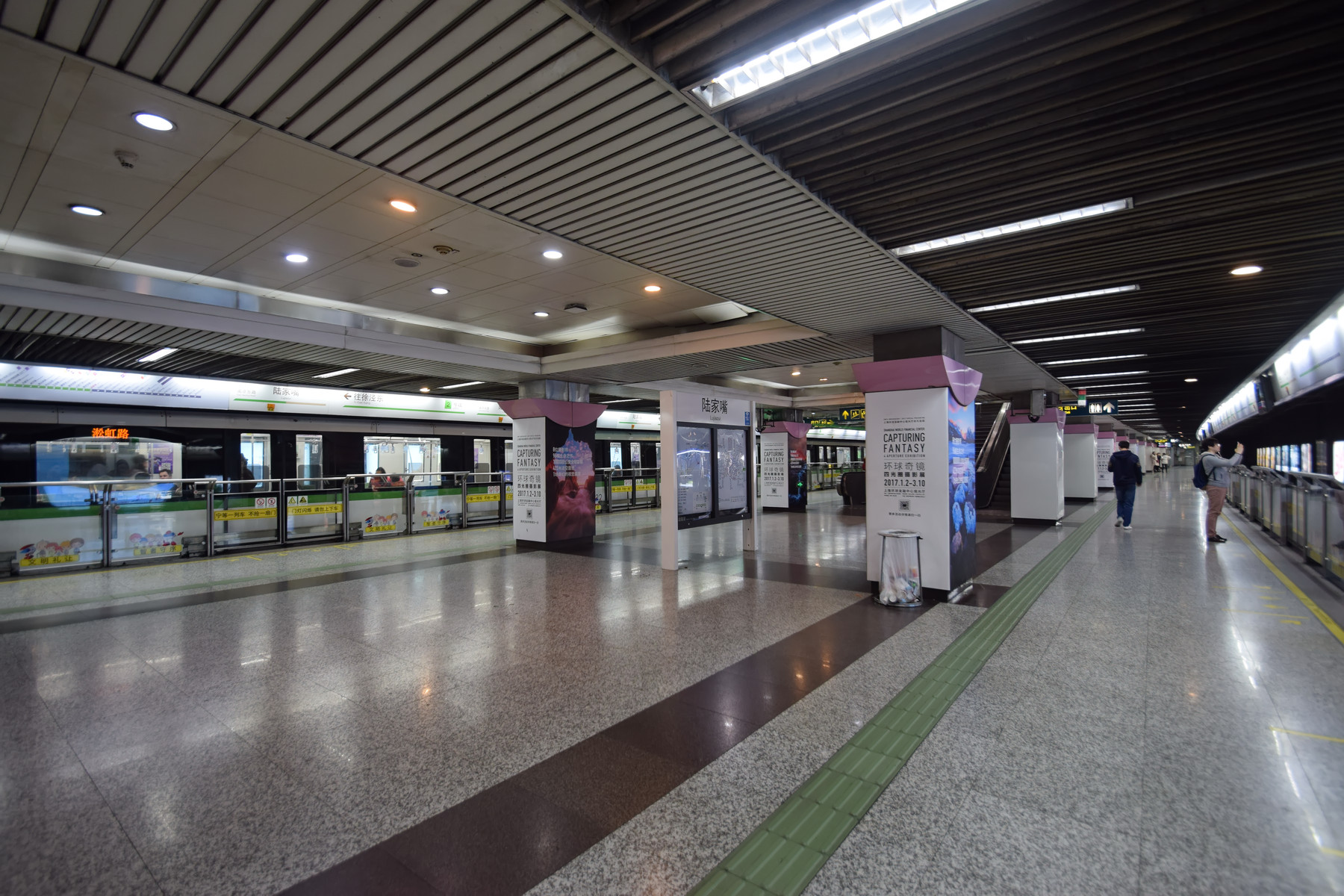
Line 2 platforms at Lujiazui station

East of the West Nanjing Road, line 2 heads eastward along West Nanjing Road, passing under the South-North Elevated Road. It then turns northeast into the People's Square, and interchange with lines 1 and 8. East of the People's Square station, the subway line moves under East Nanjing Road to the East Nanjing Road. Leaving the Huangpu District of Shanghai, the line heads under the Huangpu River and enters the Pudong New Area of Shanghai. The metro line passes the Oriental Pearl TV Tower and the World Finance Center near its station at Lujiazui. The line then runs under Century Avenue and heads southeastward to the Dongchang Road. Line 2 then heads to the Century Avenue, the largest interchange station that serves lines 4, 6 and 9 as well. Line 2 continues southeastward along Century Avenue to the Shanghai Science and Technology Museum. From here, the line turns southward through Century Park to the Century Park. From here, the line turns southeast and then east as it enters the Longyang Road, an interchange with lines 7, 16 and 18 as well as the Shanghai Maglev Train.

==== Longyang Road to Pudong International Airport ====
From the Longyang Road, the metro line heads eastward. Line 2 heads eastward, running under Zuchongzhi Road to the Zhangjiang High Technology Park station. The line heads northeastward under Zuchongzhi Road to the Jinke Road and Guanglan Road stations. Line 2 then veers away from Zuchongzhi Road and heads under the Waihuan Expressway to the Tangzhen and Middle Chuangxin Road stations, turning south. Heading southward, it heads through the East Huaxia Road and turns back east, running under Chuanhuan Road. Line 2 then passes through the Chuansha. Heading away from Chuanhuan Road, the metro line then enters the Lingkong Road and Yuandong Avenue stations along Huazhou Road before turning southeast. Line 2 then begins running parallel to the Shanghai Maglev Train as it runs under the Yingbin Expressway and enters the Haitiansan Road. From here, line 2 continues south to its terminus at the Pudong International Airport, which serves Shanghai Pudong International Airport.

==== West expansion ====
Construction started on a one station west extension from National Exhibition and Convention Center station to Panxiang Road · Shanghai National Accounting Institute station in June 2021. The extension of Line 2 to the west will improve the connection of the Hongqiao business hub to the city center and Pudong. The extension is 1.67 km in length and fully underground. It opened on 1 November 2025.

=== Station name change ===
- On 28 October 2006, Dongfang Road was renamed as the Century Avenue after station renovation for line 2 and the opening of line 4.
- In October 2006, Middle Henan Road was renamed as the East Nanjing Road.
- On 21 September 2024
  - East Xujing was renamed as the National Exhibition and Convention Center,
  - Pudong International Airport was renamed as the Pudong Airport Terminal 1&2

=== Future expansion ===
==== East expansion ====
As part of the phase IV extension of Shanghai Pudong International Airport terminal T3 will be built south of the current terminals T1, T2 and satellite terminal. The terminal T3 will be served by extending line 2 south by one station.

== Headways ==
Shanghai Metro Line 2 headway
Time		East Xujing - Songhong Road	Songhong Road - Guanglan Road	Guanglan Road - Pudong International Airport
Monday - Thursday
AM peak	7:30–9:30	About 4 min	About 2 min and 30 sec	About 4 min
Off-peak	9:30–17:00	About 8 min	About 4 min	About 8 min
PM peak	17:00–20:30	About 6 min	About 3 min	About 6 min
Other hours	Before 7:30 After 20:00	About 4 – 11 min
Friday
AM peak	7:30–9:30	About 4 min	About 2 min and 30 sec	About 4 min
Off-peak	9:00–14:30	About 8 min	About 4 min	About 8 min
PM peak	14:30–20:30	About 6 min	About 3 min	About 6 min
Other hours	Before 7:30 After 20:30	About 5 – 11 min
Saturday and Sunday (Weekends)
Peak	8:30–20:30	About 7 min and 20 sec	About 3 min and 40 sec	About 7 min and 20 sec
Other hours	Before 9:00 After 20:00	About 5 – 11 min
Extended operation (Friday and Saturday)
	After 23:00	About 10 – 20 min

== Technology ==
=== Power supply ===
Siemens Transportation Systems equipped this line with an overhead contact line (cantilever material: galvanized steel) and 7 DC traction power supply substations.

=== Signaling ===
As the first part of Line 2 was opened 20 years ago and the line has been experiencing congestion after rapid ridership growth. In 2014, Shanghai Metro investigated upgrading the existing signal system of line 2 (US&S United Signal AF900, fixed block TBTC) to increase the frequency of trains and reduce congestion. In October 2020, a new CASCO Tranavi (moving block CBTC, DTO) signaling system was overlaid on the existing signaling system on Line 2. Therefore, line 2 will be the first in the world to have two signal systems, the new primary one for day-to-day operations and the existing older one serving as a backup system during signal faults. Intervals of trains on Line 2 could be reduced to 90 seconds thanks to the new signal system with the backup system capable of maintaining two minute headways. For the new system, a total of 100 trains on Line 2 will have their onboard signal systems upgraded. As of 2020 upgrading work was finished on 31 trains (the new 02A05 trains). The new signalling system was put into operation on January 27, 2024, which made it the longest signalling system renovation project in China.

=== Rolling stock ===
When line 2 was opened to traffic, the AC02 trains were not delivered. Therefore, some of the DC01 and AC01 trains were borrowed from line 1.

All are 8-car Class A (Note: Class A carriage: 21-24m in length, 3.0m in width and 3.8m in height; Capacity: about 310 people.) rolling stock.

Shanghai Metro Line 2 rolling stock
Fleet numbers	Manufacturer	Time of manufac- turing	Class	No of car	Assembly (Note: Tc: Trailer with cab; Mp: EMU with pantograph; M: EMU without pantograph.)	Rolling stock	Number	Notes
128	ADtranz (Note: ADtranz was acquired by Bombardier in May 2001. Subsequently, in January 2021 it was acquired by Alstom.) and Siemens	2000-2001	A	8	Tc+Mp+M+Mp+M+Mp+M+Tc	02A01	201-216 (00071-00781, 01011-01241, 01262-01293, 01322-01353, 01382-01413, 01442-01473, 01502-01533, 01562-01593, 01622-01653 and 01682-01713)	Original name: AC02. In 2007, the six carriage 201-216 trainsets were expanded to eight carriage by using the middle carriages from 217-224.
168	Even numbers: SATCO (Note: SATCO (Shanghai Alstom Transportation Equipment Co., Ltd.) is a joint venture between Alstom Metropolis and Shanghai Electric.) (and 0253); Odd numbers: CRRC Nanjing Puzhen Co., Ltd.	2007-2009	A	8	Tc+Mp+M+Mp+M+M+Mp+Tc	02A02	0233-0253 (021291-022961)	Original name: AC08.
128	SATCO (0262-0269); CRRC Nanjing Puzhen Co., Ltd. (0254-0261)	2009-2010	A	8	Tc+Mp+M+Mp+M+Mp+Mp+Tc	02A03	0254-0269 (022971-024241)	Original name: AC17a. Although the car has 4 pantographs, the sixth pantograph with carriage (Mp car) is generally not used.
128	SATCO; CRRC Nanjing Puzhen Co., Ltd.	2009-2010 2018-2020 (expansion cars)	A	8	Tc+Mp+M+Mp+M+Mp+Mp+Tc	02A04	0270-0285 (024251-025522)	Formerly four car trainsets; 4 new carriages plugged in to form an eight car train.
248	CRRC Zhuzhou Locomotive Co., Ltd.	2017-2020	A	8	Tc+Mp+M+Mp+M+M+Mp+Tc	02A05	02086-02116 (025531-027931)

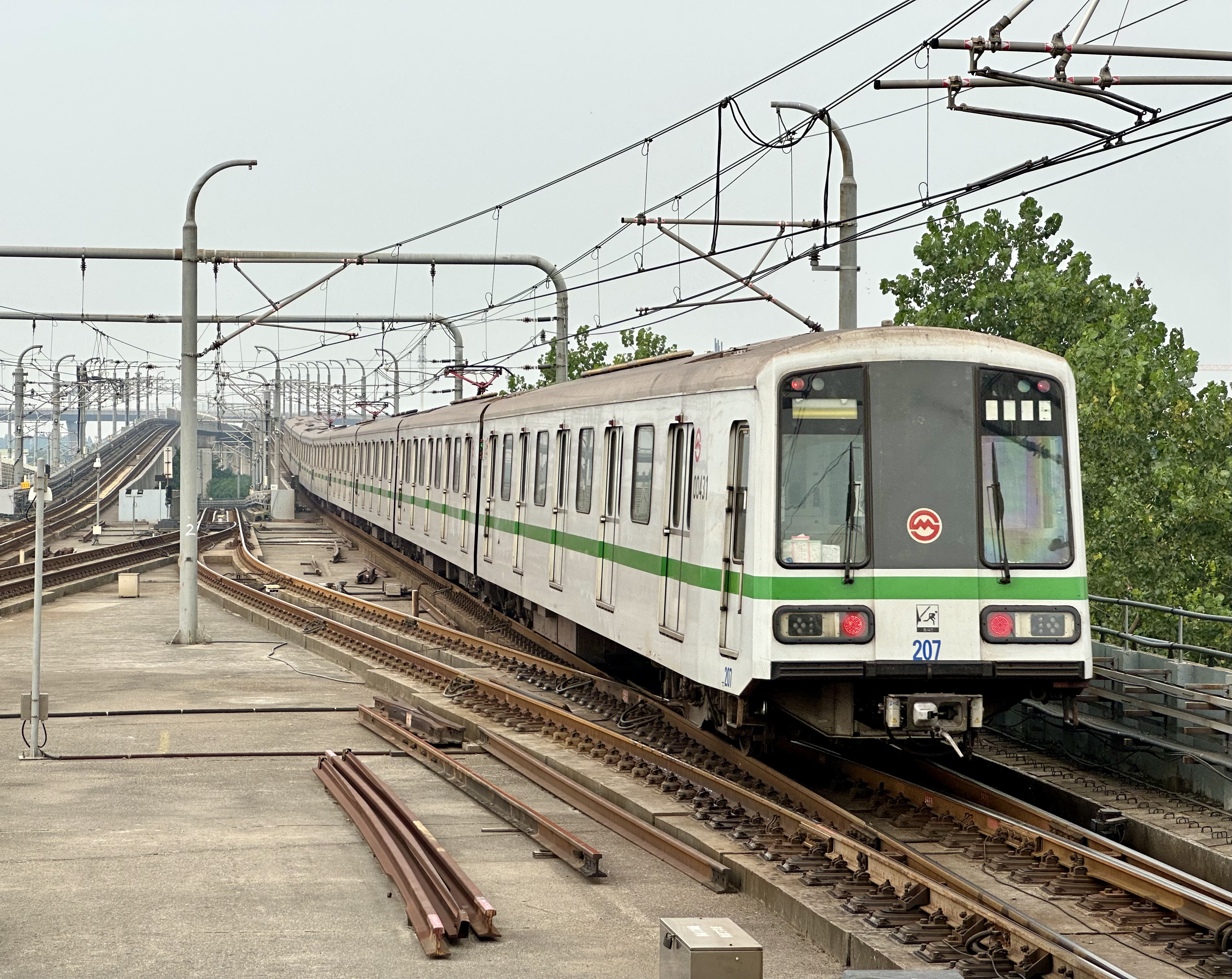
02A01 train

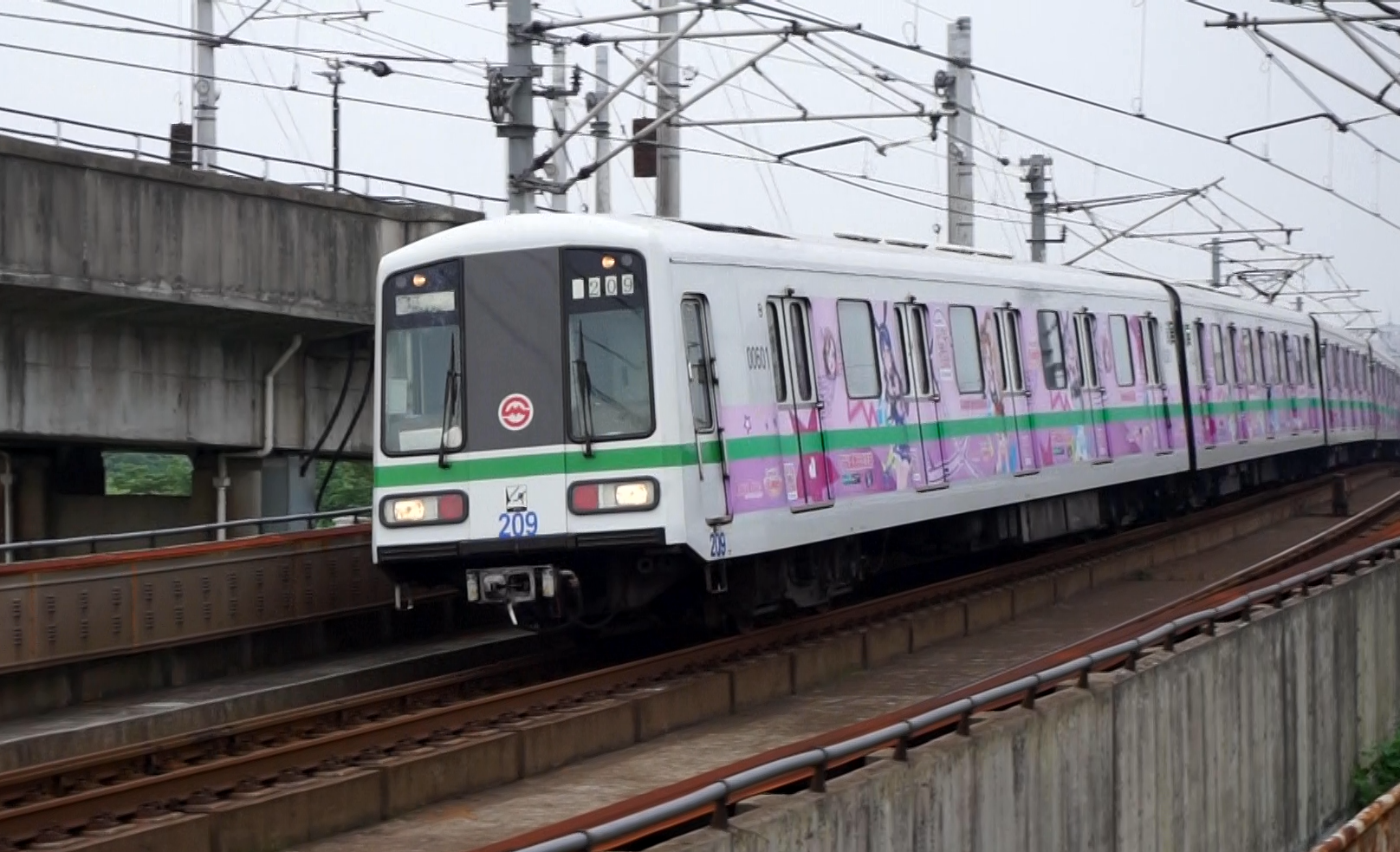
02A01 train with Love Live! livery

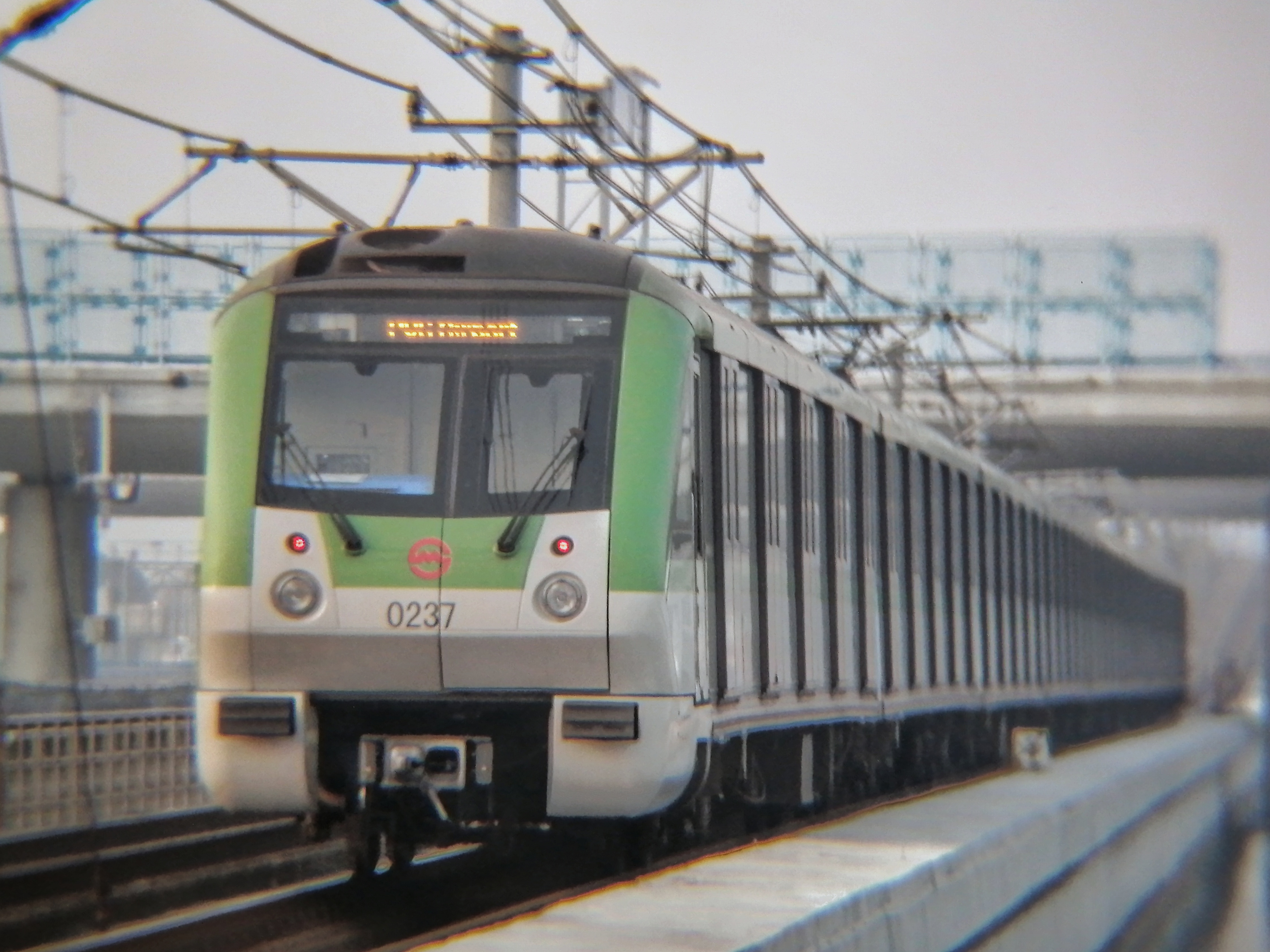
02A02 train

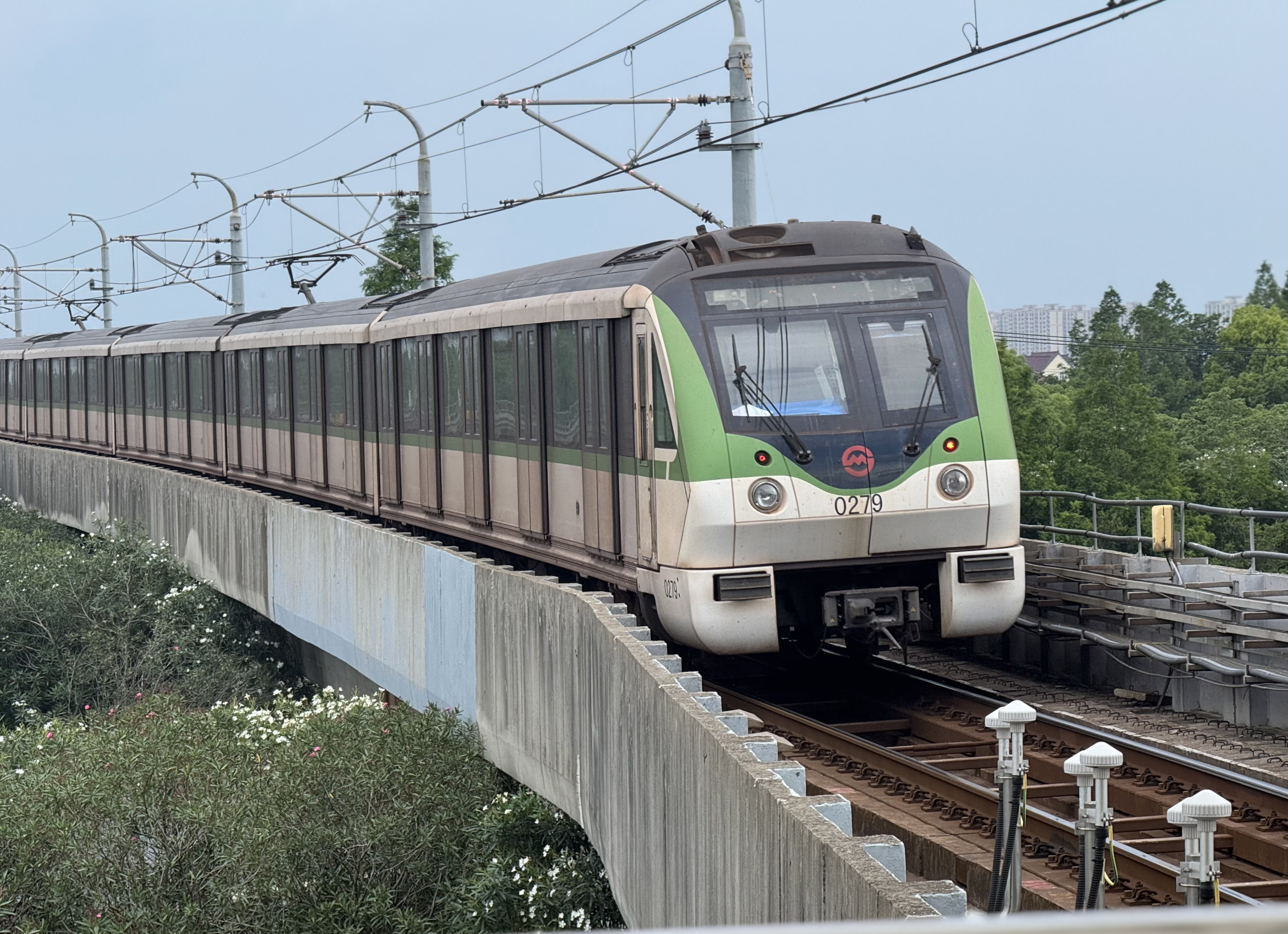
02A04 train after being expanded to 8 cars
