= Weining Road station =

Shanghai Metro station

Weining Road 威宁路
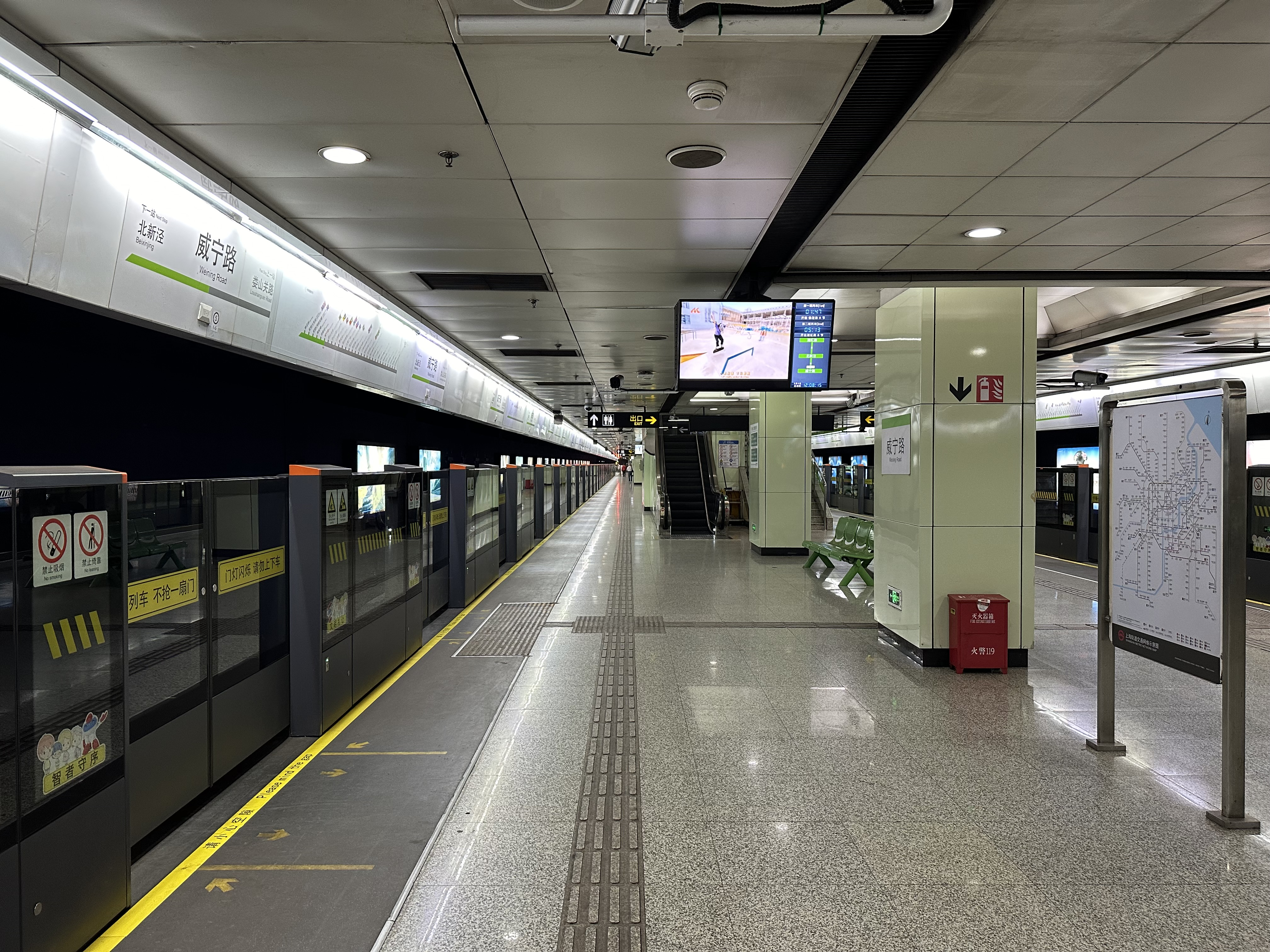
- Station platform

General information
- Location: Tianshan Road (天山路) and Weining Road (威宁路); Changning District, Shanghai; China
- Coordinates: 31°12′54″N 121°23′14″E
- Operator: Shanghai No. 2 Metro Operation Co. Ltd.
- Line: Line 2
- Platforms: 2 (1 island platform)
- Tracks: 2

Construction
- Structure type: Underground
- Accessible: Yes

Other information
- Station code: L02/25

History
- Opened: 30 December 2006

Services
| Preceding station | Shanghai Metro | Following station |
|---|---|---|
| Beixinjing towards Panxiang Road · Shanghai National Accounting Institute | Line 2 | Loushanguan Road towards Pudong Airport Terminal 1&2 |
Location
- Location within Shanghai

Weining Road (Chinese: 威宁路; pinyin: Wēiníng Lù) is a station on Line 2 of the Shanghai Metro in Changning District. It is part of the western extension of that line from Zhongshan Park to Songhong Road that opened on 30 December 2006.
