= Shanghai Science and Technology Museum station =

Shanghai Metro station

Shanghai Science and Technology Museum 上海科技馆
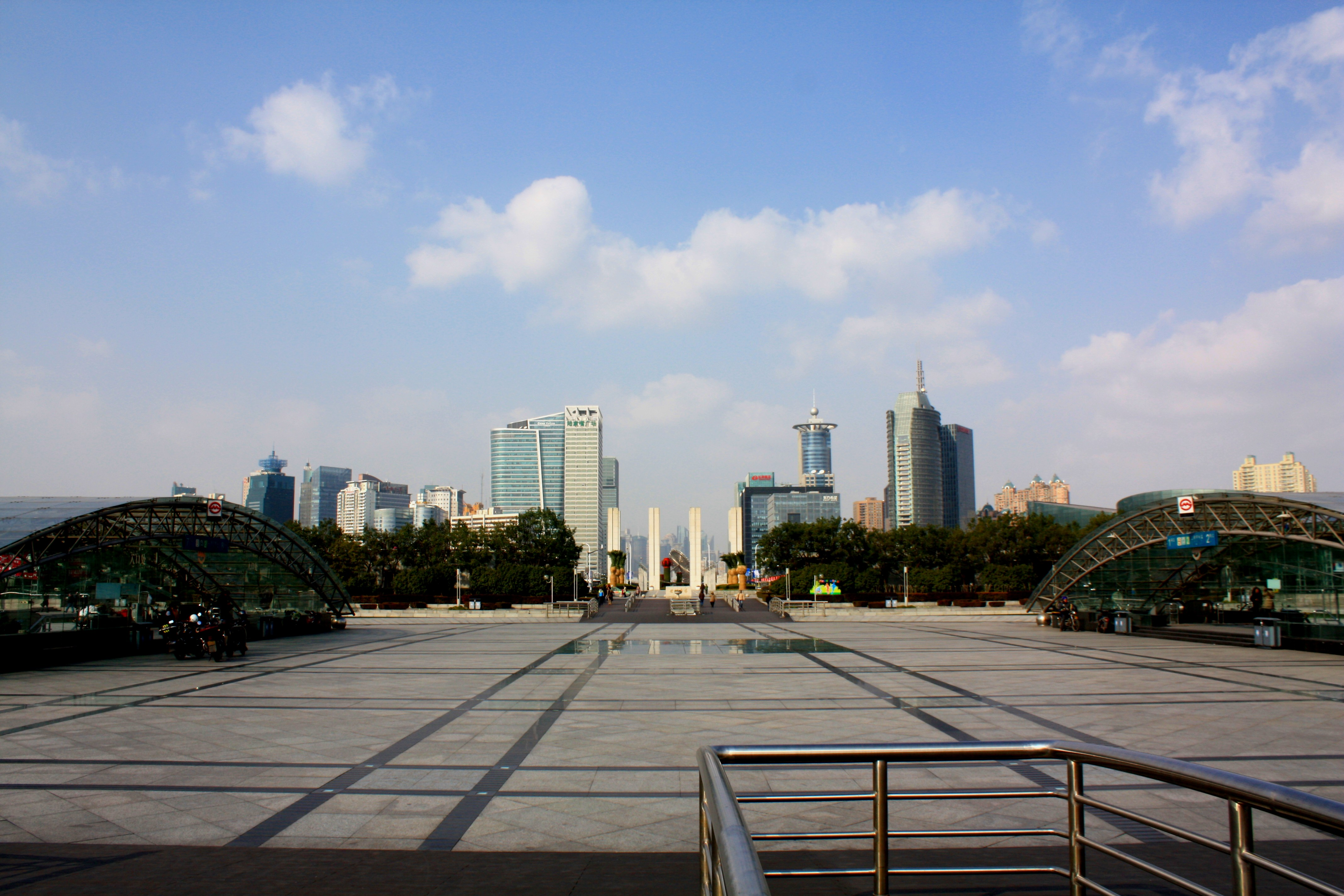
- Entrances in the square near the museum

General information
- Location: East end of Century Avenue; Pudong, Shanghai; China
- Coordinates: 31°13′11″N 121°32′35″E
- Operator: Shanghai No. 2 Metro Operation Co. Ltd.
- Line: Line 2
- Platforms: 2 (1 island platform)
- Tracks: 2

Construction
- Structure type: Underground
- Accessible: Yes

Other information
- Station code: L02/14

History
- Opened: 20 September 1999
- Former names: South Yanggao Road (up to 12 December 2001)

Services
Preceding station	Shanghai Metro	Following station
Century Avenue towards Panxiang Road · Shanghai National Accounting Institute	Line 2	Century Park towards Pudong Airport Terminal 1&2
Location
- Location within Shanghai

Shanghai Science and Technology Museum (Chinese: 上海科技馆; pinyin: Shànghǎi Kējìguǎn) is a station on Shanghai Metro Line 2. It features the large underground AP Plaza shopping mall.

The station is linked directly to the Shanghai Science and Technology Museum, and is part of the initial section of Line 2 that opened from Zhongshan Park to Longyang Road that opened on 20 September 1999.

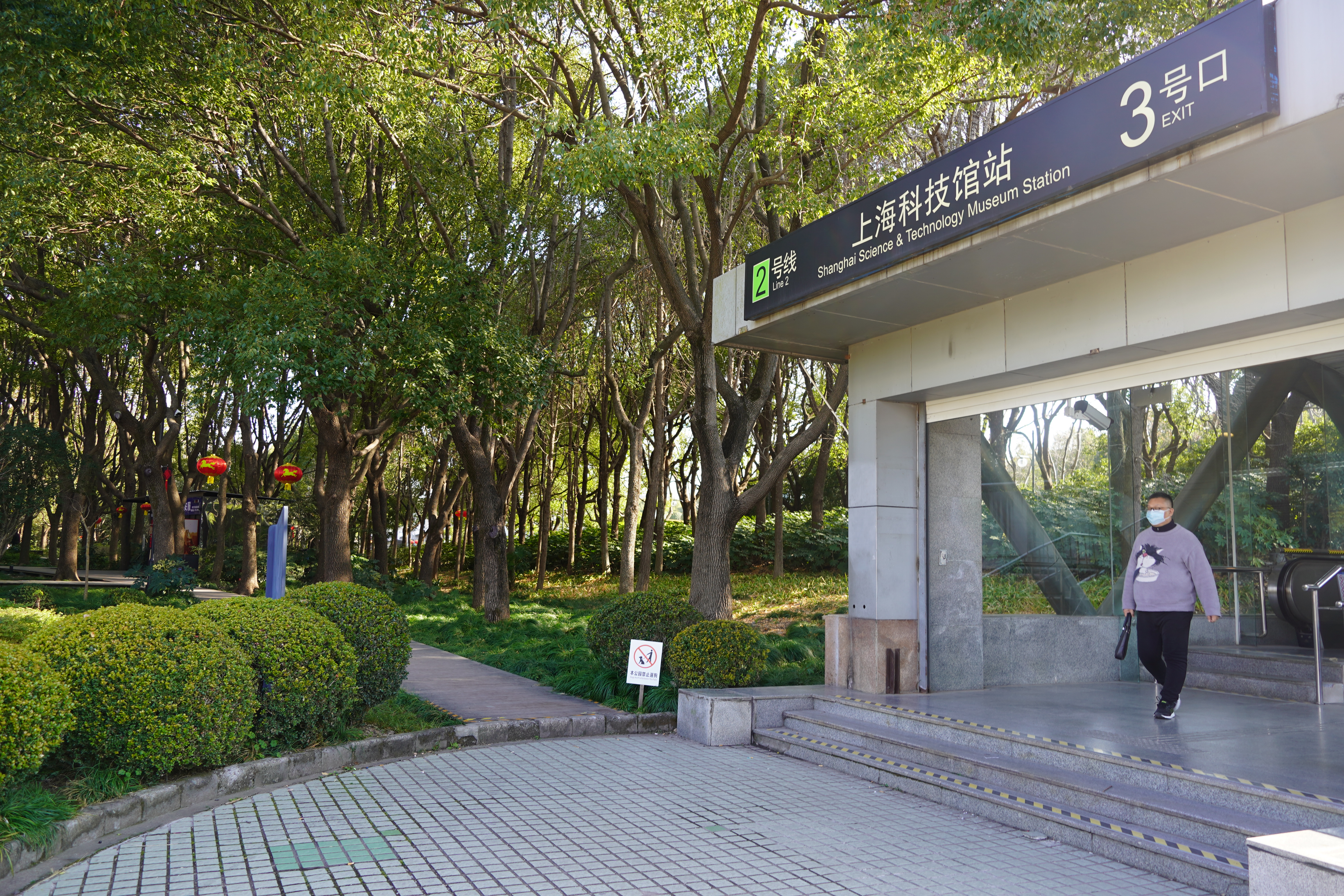
Entry of the Shanghai Science & Technology Museum station

== Places nearby ==
- Shanghai Science and Technology Museum
- Century Avenue
- Century Park
- Pudong New Area Government
