= Century Park station =

Century Park station may refer to:

- Century Park station (Edmonton), a light rail station in Canada
- Century Park station (Shanghai Metro), a metro station in China
