= Henan Road (Shanghai) =

Street in Shanghai, China

For the metro station formerly known as Middle Henan Road Station, see East Nanjing Road (Shanghai Metro)

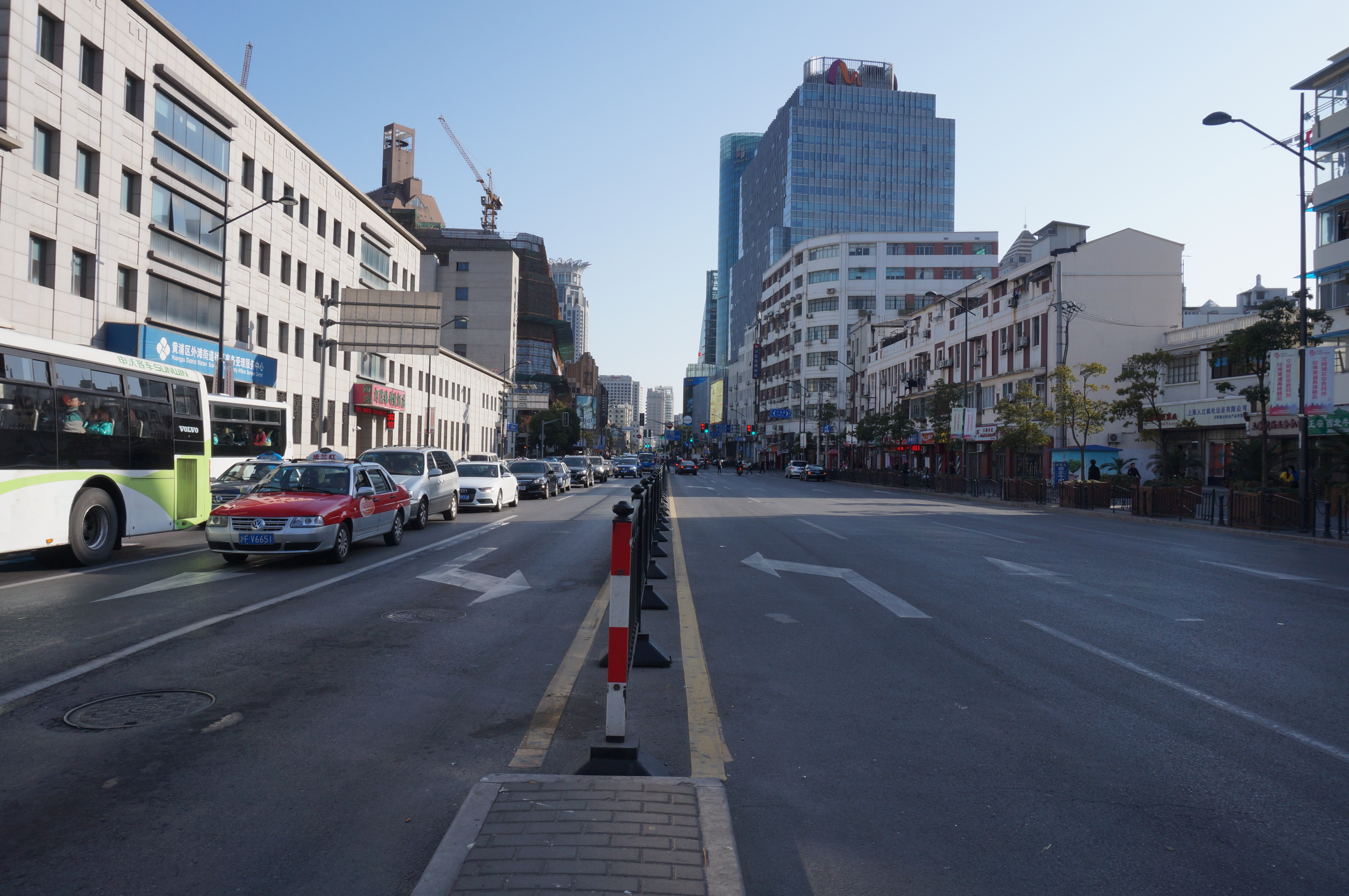
Middle Henan Road

Henan Road (Chinese: 河南路; pinyin: Hénán Lù) is a major thoroughfare in Huangpu District, Shanghai.

== Sections ==
Running in a north–south direction, the road is divided into three sections:

- North Henan Road (Chinese: 河南北路; pinyin: Hénán Běi Lù)
- Middle Henan Road (to a lesser extent: Central Henan Road; Chinese: 河南中路; pinyin: Hénán Zhōng Lù), crossing Nanjing Road pedestrian street, an important shopping street of Shanghai, and Suzhou Creek. The road was formerly romanized as Honan Road and prior to that as Barrier Road, since it was located along the initial western boundary of the International Settlement of Shanghai.
- South Henan Road (Chinese: 河南南路; pinyin: Hénán Nán Lù)

== Transportation ==
- East Nanjing Road station of the Shanghai Metro is located at the intersection of Henan and East Nanjing Roads.
