= Lujiazui station =

Shanghai Metro station

Lujiazui 陆家嘴
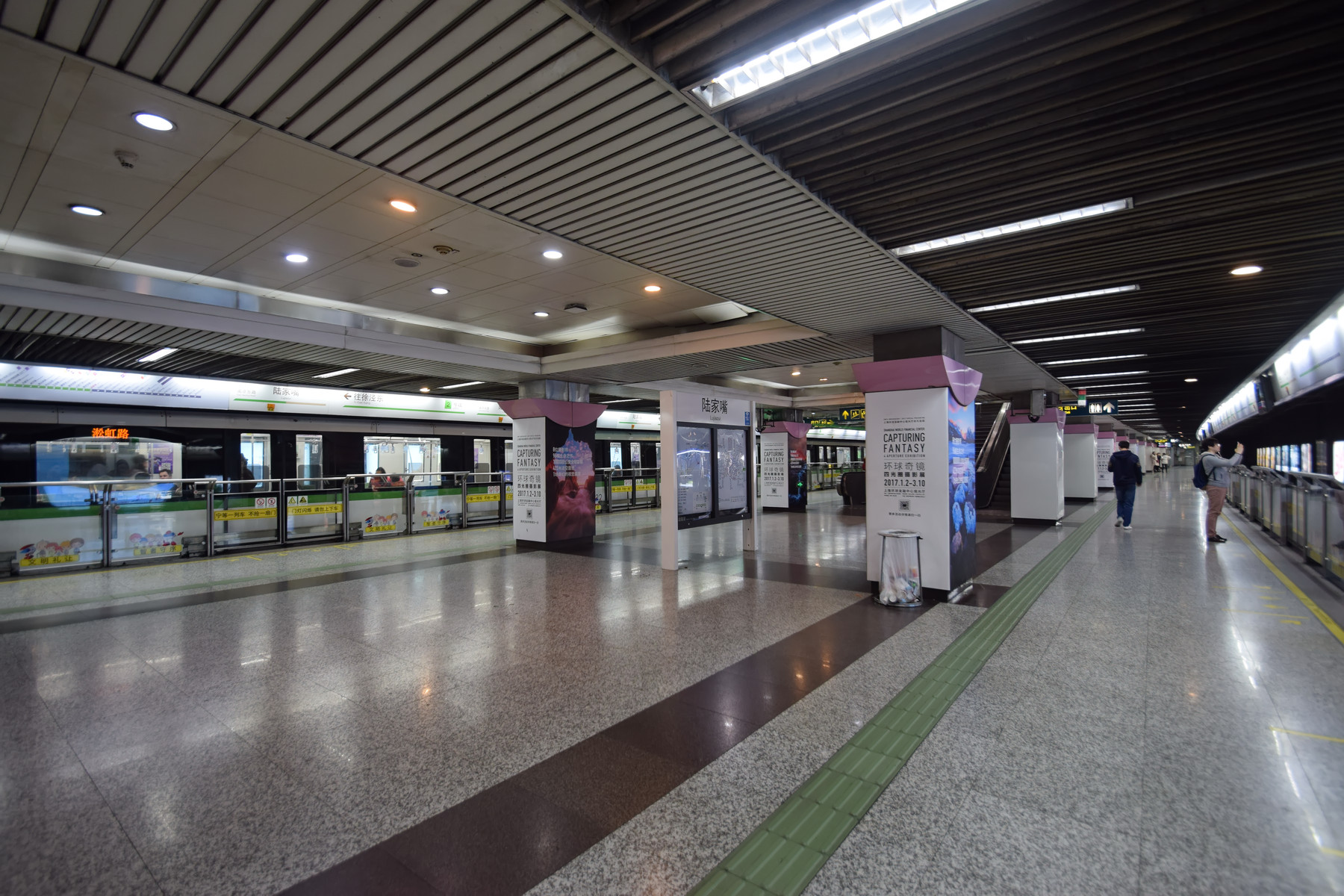
- Platform of Line 2 in 2017

General information
- Location: Century Avenue and Middle Yincheng Road (银城中路); Lujiazui, Pudong, Shanghai; China
- Coordinates: 31°14′18″N 121°30′08″E
- Operator: Shanghai No. 2 Metro Operation Co. Ltd.
- Lines: Line 2; Line 14
- Platforms: 4 (2 island platforms)
- Tracks: 4

Construction
- Structure type: Underground
- Accessible: Yes

History
- Opened: 20 September 1999 (Line 2); 30 December 2021 (Line 14)

Services
Preceding station	Shanghai Metro	Following station
East Nanjing Road towards Panxiang Road · Shanghai National Accounting Institute	Line 2	South Pudong Road towards Pudong Airport Terminal 1&2
Yuyuan Garden towards Fengbang	Line 14	South Pudong Road towards Guiqiao Road
Location
- Location within Shanghai

Lujiazui (Chinese: 陆家嘴; pinyin: Lùjiāzuǐ) is a station on Line 2 and 14 of the Shanghai Metro rapid transit system, situated in the middle of the financial district of Lujiazui. This station is the first stop in Pudong going east towards Shanghai Pudong International Airport, and is part of the initial section of Line 2 that opened from Zhongshan Park to Longyang Road that opened on 20 September 1999. The station later became an interchange on 30 December 2021 after the opening of Line 14. Being at the center of the Lujiazui financial district, the station is of significance to the area.

== Location ==
Lujiazui station is located in the financial district of the same name near the eastern bank of the Huangpu River. Located at the major intersection of Century Avenue, Fenghe Road, Lujiazui West Road, and Lujiazui Ring Road, the station is within reach of many famous attractions in Shanghai. To the northwest is the Oriental Pearl Tower, Shanghai IFC lies to the immediate south, and Super Brand Mall lies to the southwest. Further afield, the Jin Mao Tower and Shanghai World Financial Center lie to the southeast, the latter of which is equidistant between Lujiazui and Dongchang Road stations. A number of parks, including Lujiazui Central Green, are within a few minutes' walk from the station as well.

== Station layout ==
1F	Ground level	Exits 1-7, 9-10
B1	Line 2 concourse	Tickets, Service Center
B1		Exit 8
B2	Platform 1	← Line 2 towards Panxiang Road · Shanghai National Accounting Institute (East Nanjing Road)
B2	Island platform, doors open on the left
B2	Platform 2	Line 2 towards Pudong Airport Terminal 1&2 (South Pudong Road) →
B2	Line 14 concourse	Tickets, Service Center
B3	Platform 3	← Line 14 towards Fengbang (Yuyuan Garden)
B3	Island platform, doors open on the left
B3	Platform 4	Line 14 towards Guiqiao Road (South Pudong Road) →

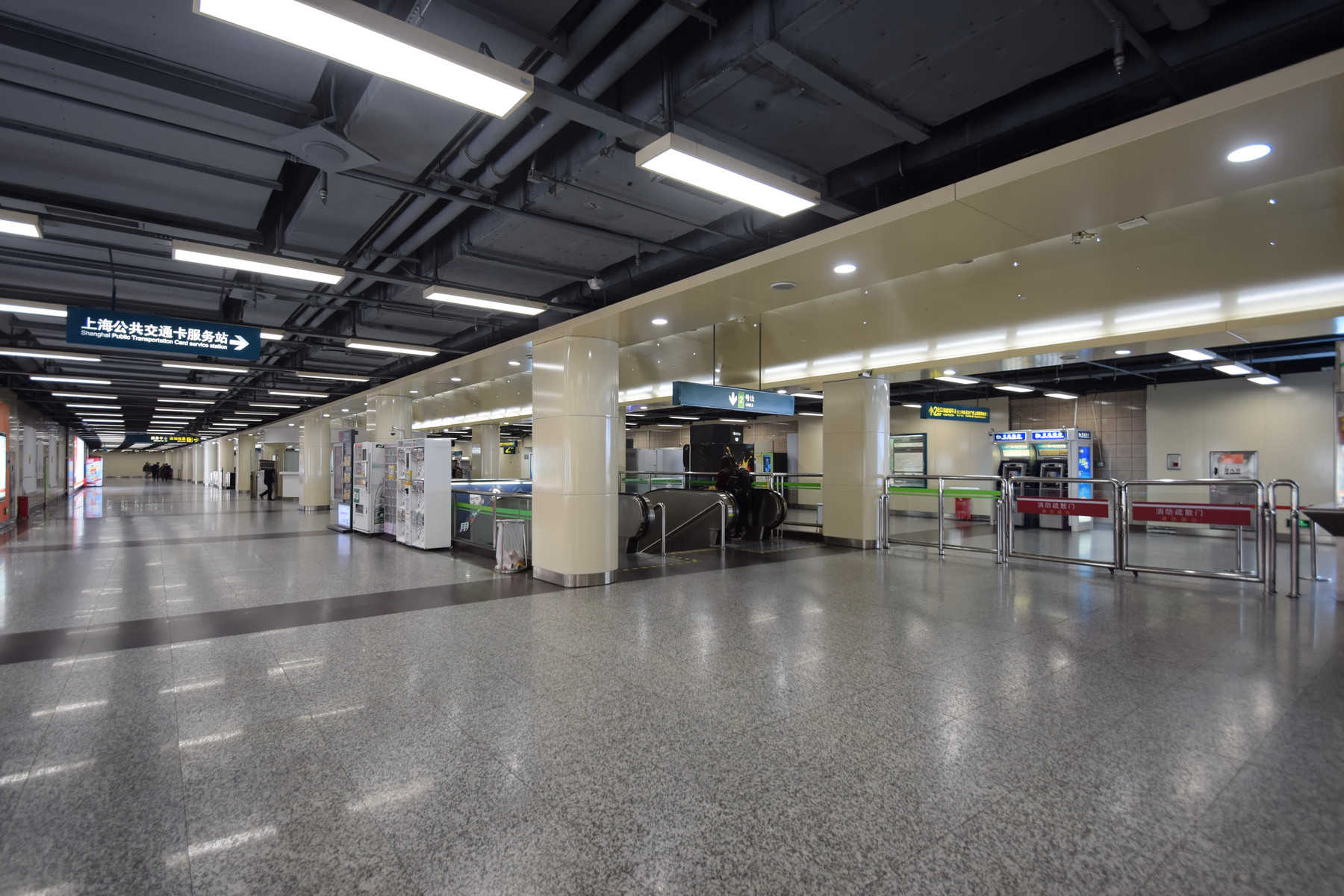
Line 2 concourse in 2017

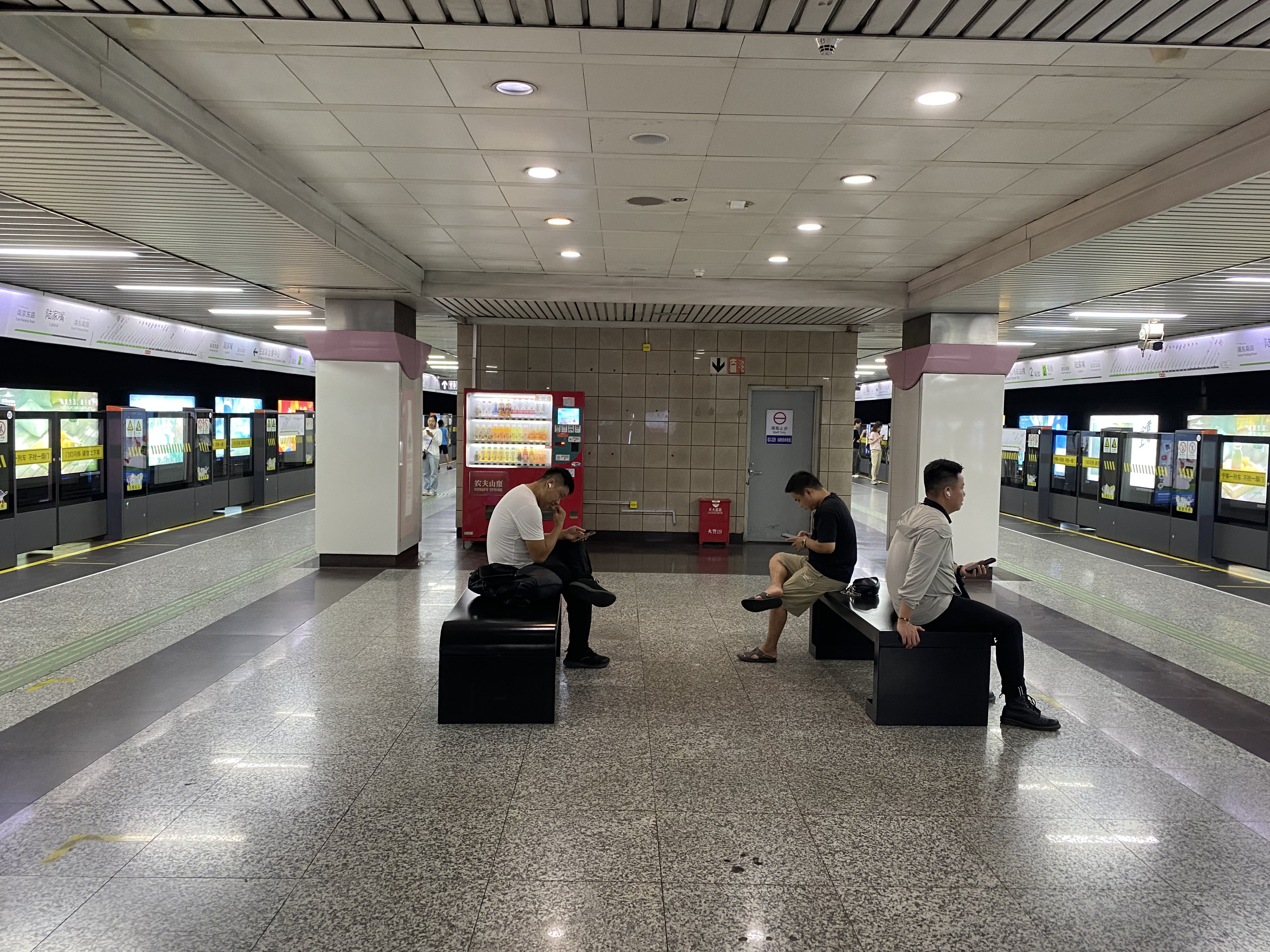
Line 2 platform in 2025

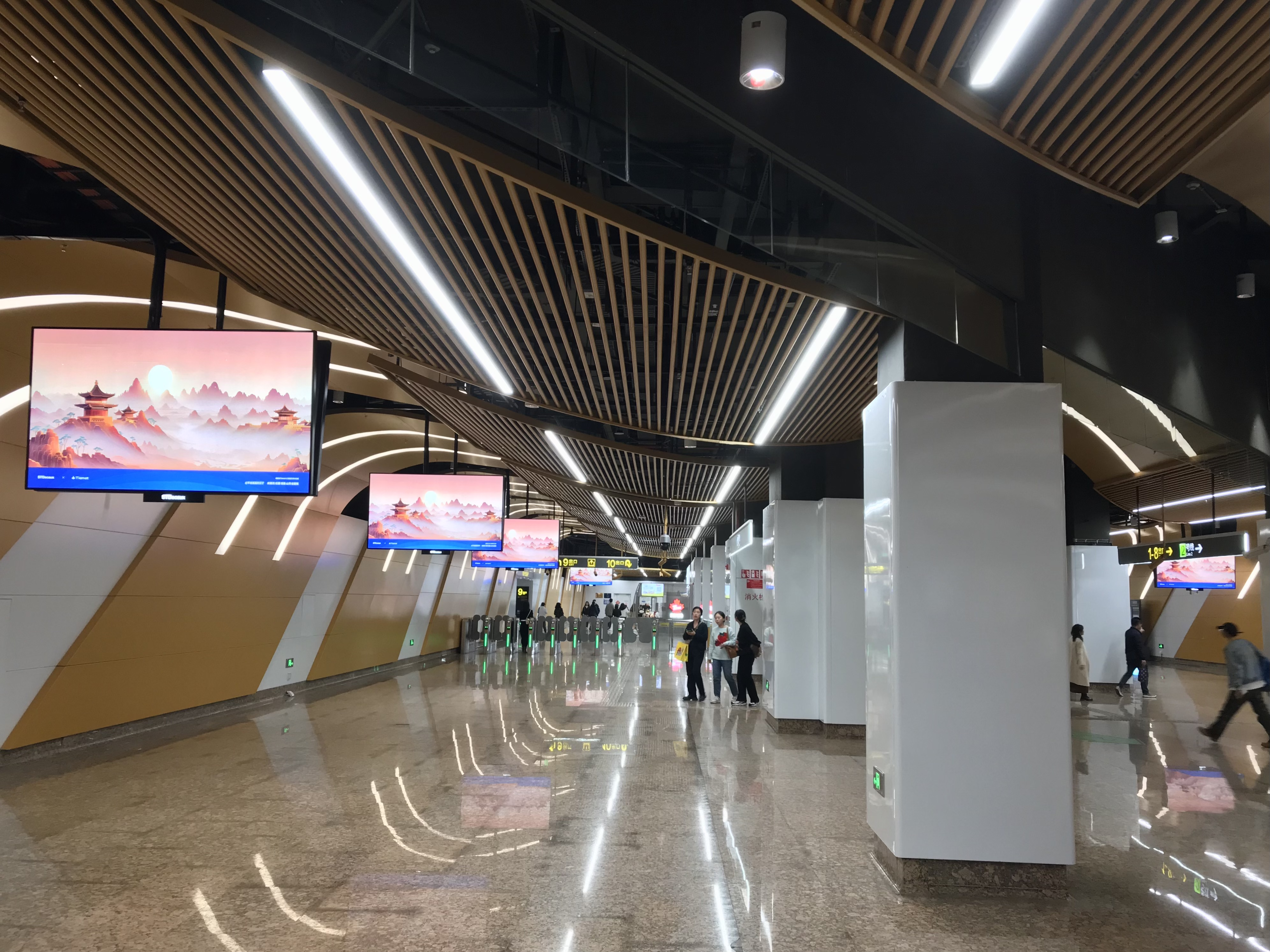
Line 14 concourse

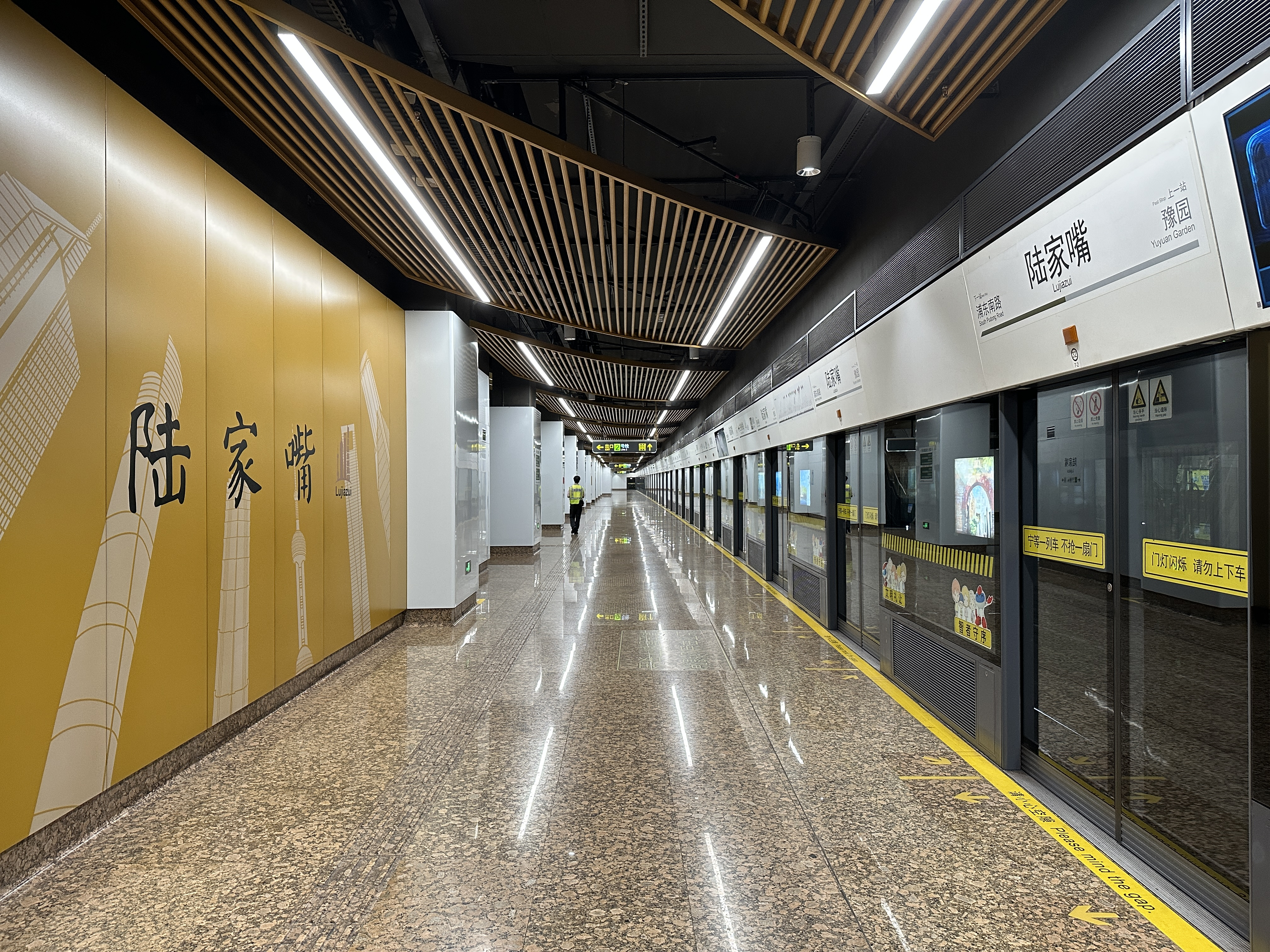
Line 14 platform

=== Entrances/exits ===
Lujiazui has eleven exits. Exits 1-6 connect line 2, exits 7-10 connect line 14. Exit 8 is located at the LG2 level of Shanghai IFC.

- 1: Lujiazui Ring Road, Oriental Pearl Tower
- 2: Century Avenue
- 3: Century Avenue
- 4: Century Avenue
- 5: Century Avenue, Yincheng Road(M)
- 6: Century Avenue, Shanghai IFC, Yincheng Road(M)
- 7: Yincheng Road(M)
- 8: Shanghai IFC
- 9A & 9B: Huayuanshiqiao Road, Lujiazui Ring Road, Yincheng Road(M)
- 10: Huayuanshiqiao Road, Lujiazui Ring Road
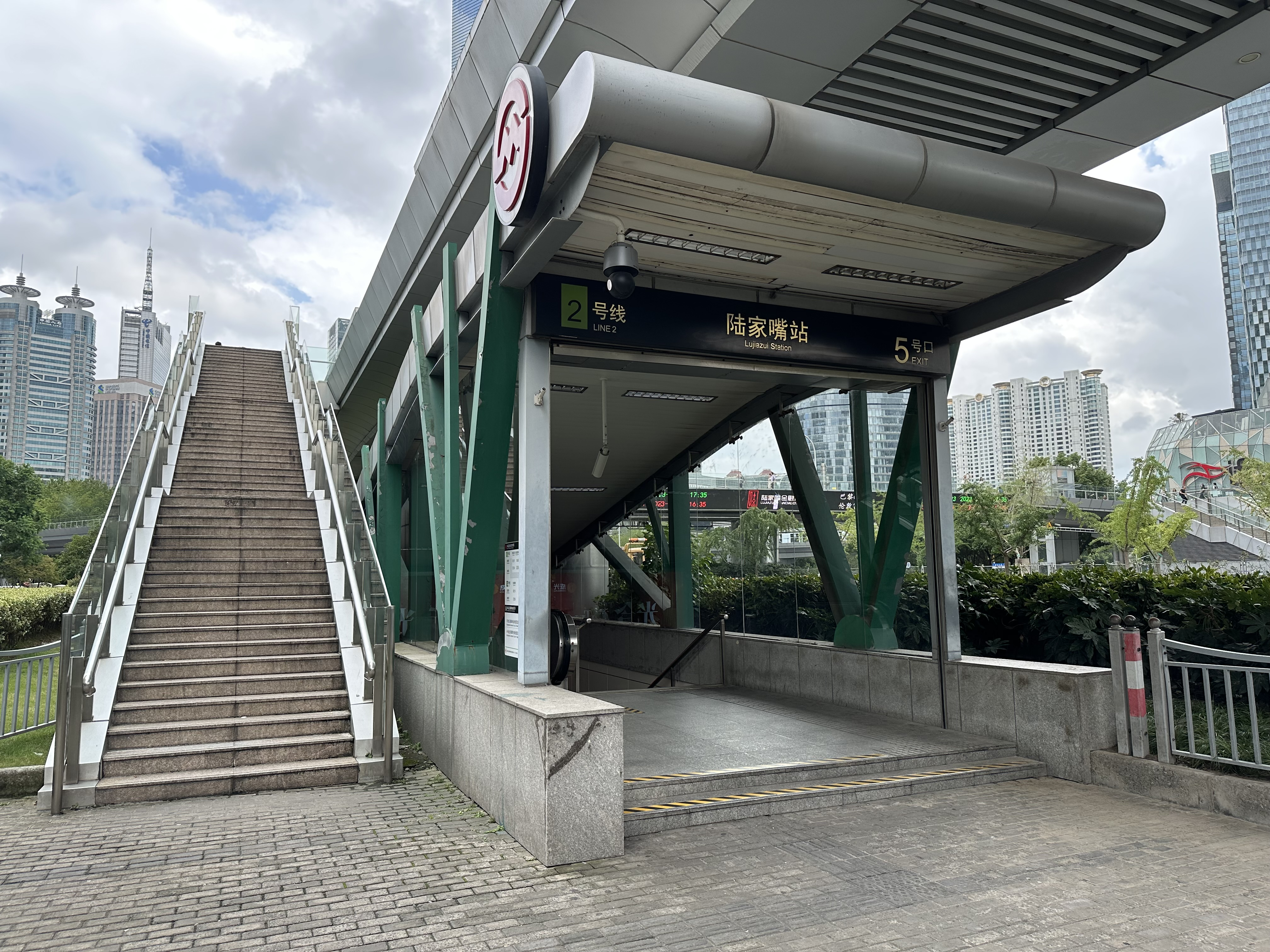
Exit 5

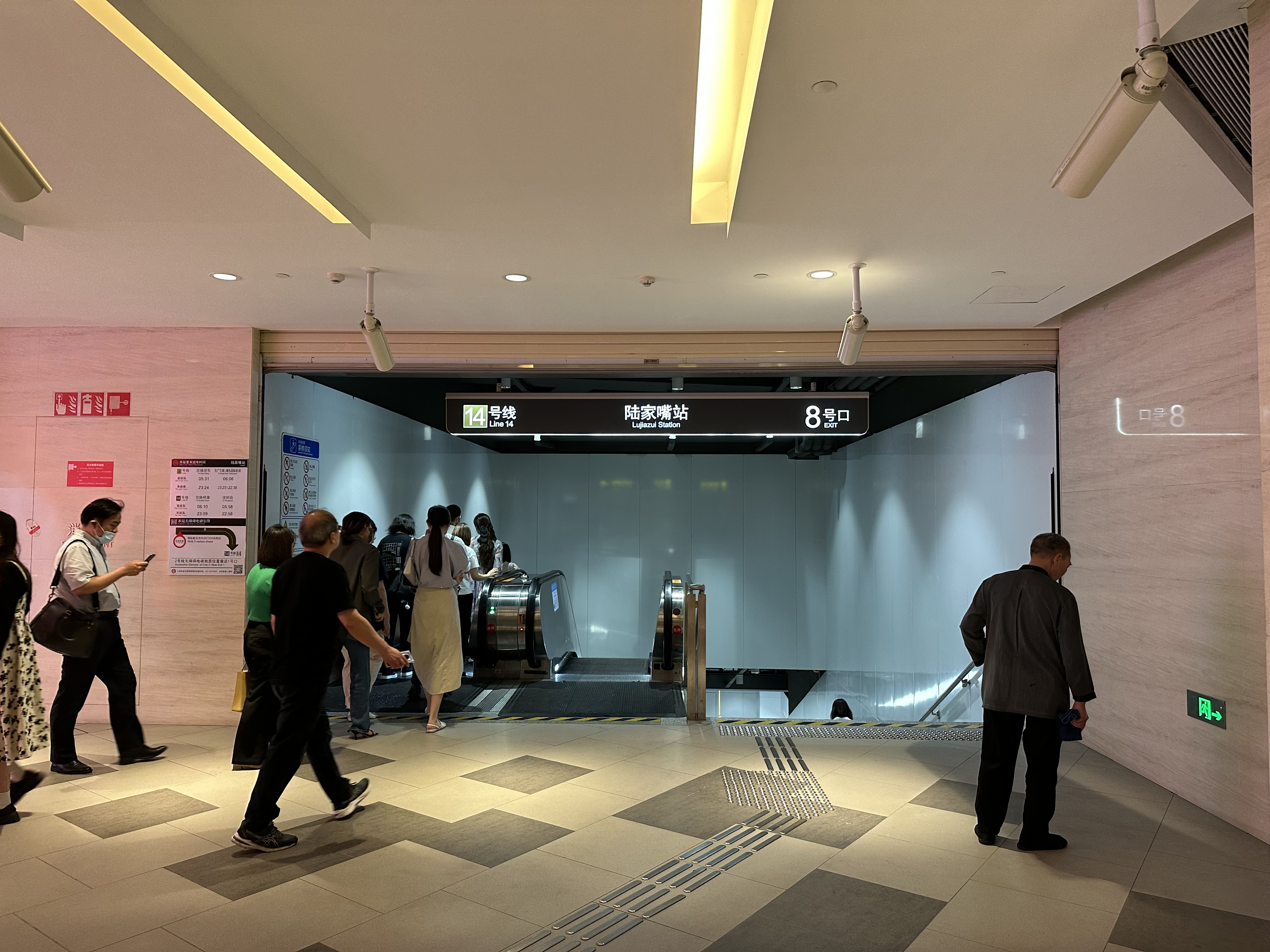
Exit 8
