= Century Park station (Shanghai Metro) =

Shanghai Metro station

Century Park 世纪公园
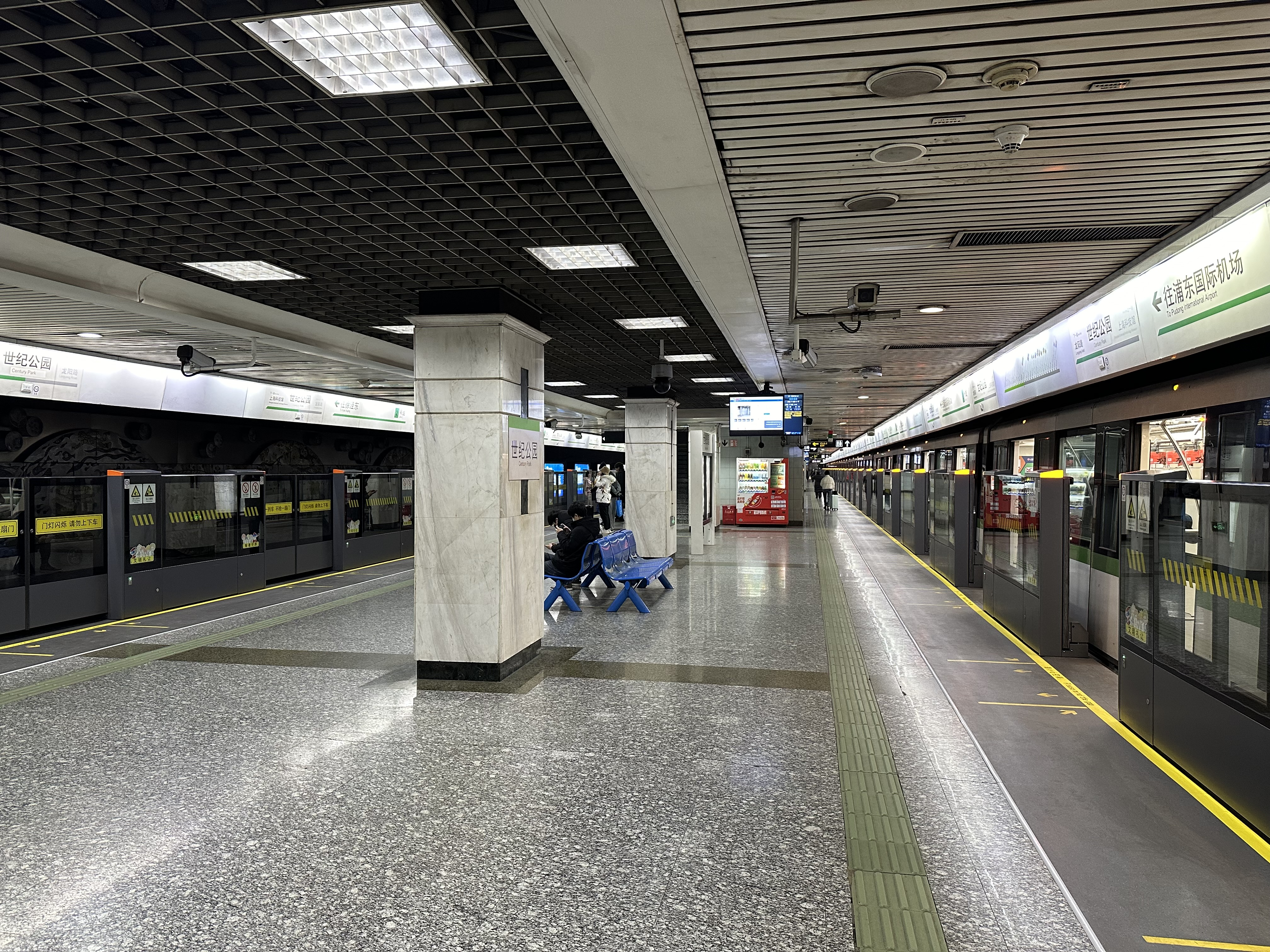
- Station platform

General information
- Location: Huamu Subdistrict, Pudong, Shanghai; China
- Coordinates: 31°12′32″N 121°33′05″E
- Operator: Shanghai No. 2 Metro Operation Co. Ltd.
- Line: Line 2
- Platforms: 2 (1 island platform)
- Tracks: 2

Construction
- Structure type: Underground
- Accessible: Yes

Other information
- Station code: L02/13

History
- Opened: 20 September 1999
- Former names: Pudong Central Park (up to 19 April 2000)

Services
Preceding station	Shanghai Metro	Following station
Shanghai Science and Technology Museum towards Panxiang Road · Shanghai National Accounting Institute	Line 2	Longyang Road towards Pudong Airport Terminal 1&2
Location
- Location within Shanghai

Century Park (Chinese: 世纪公园; pinyin: Shìjì Gōngyuán), formerly transliterated as Shiji Park, is a station on Line 2 of the Shanghai Metro. It is named after the nearby Century Park (and is closest to Exit No. 7 of the park), and should not be confused with the Century Avenue station. This station is part of the initial section of Line 2 that opened from Zhongshan Park to Longyang Road that opened on 20 September 1999.

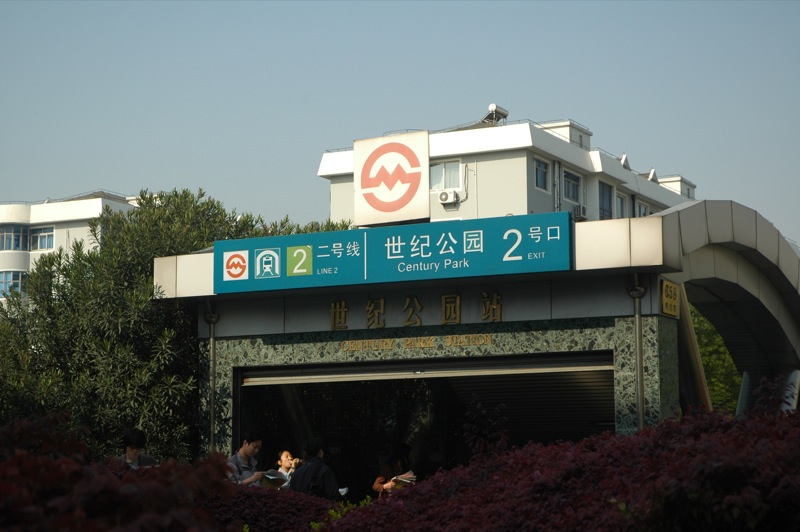
Station entrance

== Places nearby ==
- Century Park
- Shanghai Science and Technology Museum
