= Beixinjing station =

Shanghai Metro station

Beixinjing 北新泾
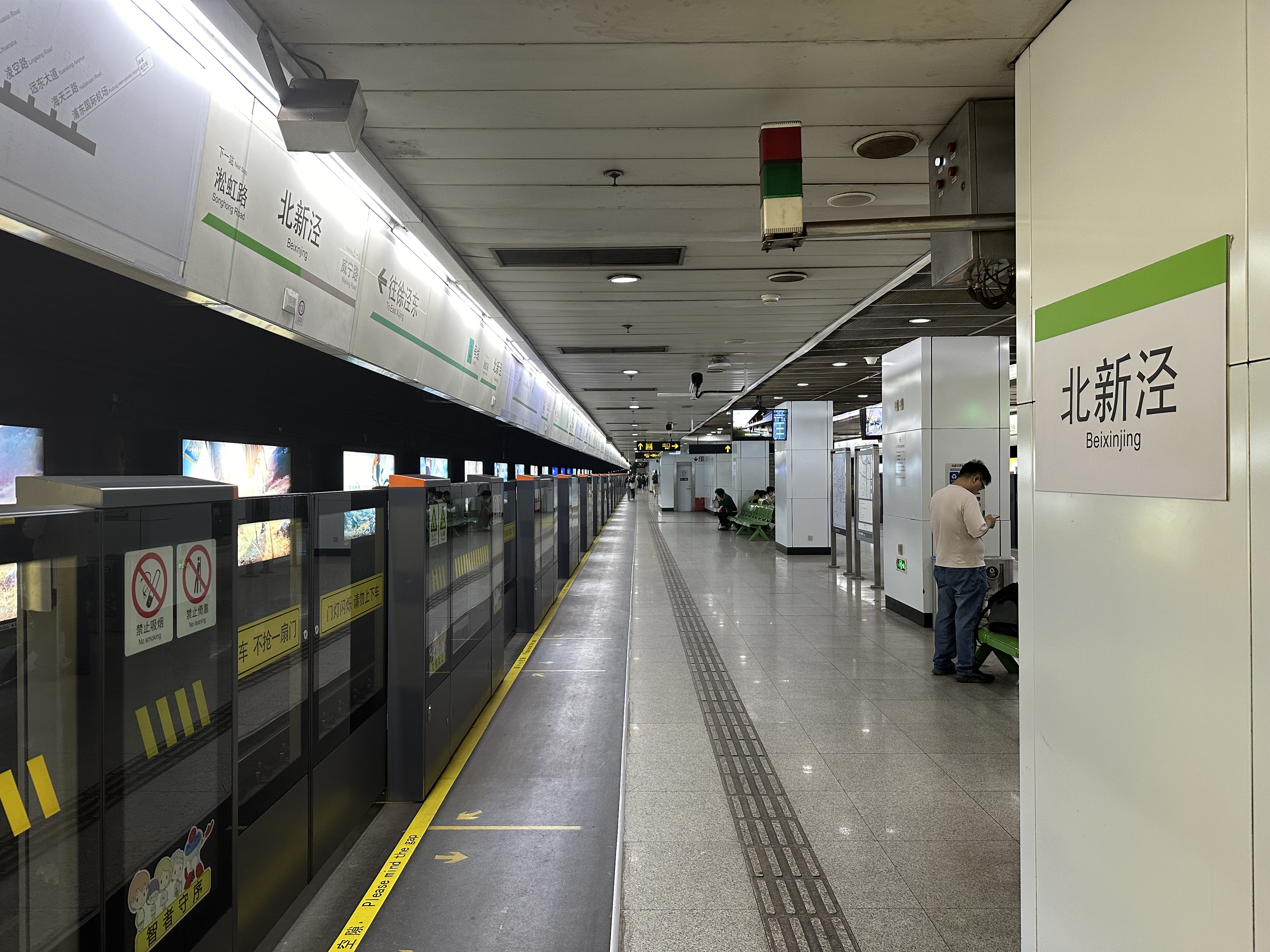
- Station platform

General information
- Location: West Tianshan Road (天山西路); Changning District, Shanghai; China
- Coordinates: 31°12′59″N 121°22′26″E
- Operator: Shanghai No. 2 Metro Operation Co. Ltd.
- Line: Line 2
- Platforms: 2 (1 island platform)
- Tracks: 2

Construction
- Structure type: Underground
- Accessible: Yes

Other information
- Station code: L02/26

History
- Opened: 30 December 2006

Services
| Preceding station | Shanghai Metro | Following station |
|---|---|---|
| Songhong Road towards Panxiang Road · Shanghai National Accounting Institute | Line 2 | Weining Road towards Pudong Airport Terminal 1&2 |
Location
- Location within Shanghai

Beixinjing (Chinese: 北新泾; pinyin: Běixīnjīng) is a station on Line 2 of the Shanghai Metro in Changning District. It is part of the western extension of that line from Zhongshan Park to Songhong Road that opened on 30 December 2006. It is within walking distance of the Brilliance West shopping mall.
