= Shanghai Metro AC08 =

Rolling stock of Shanghai Metro Line 2

Shanghai Metro 02A02 AC08
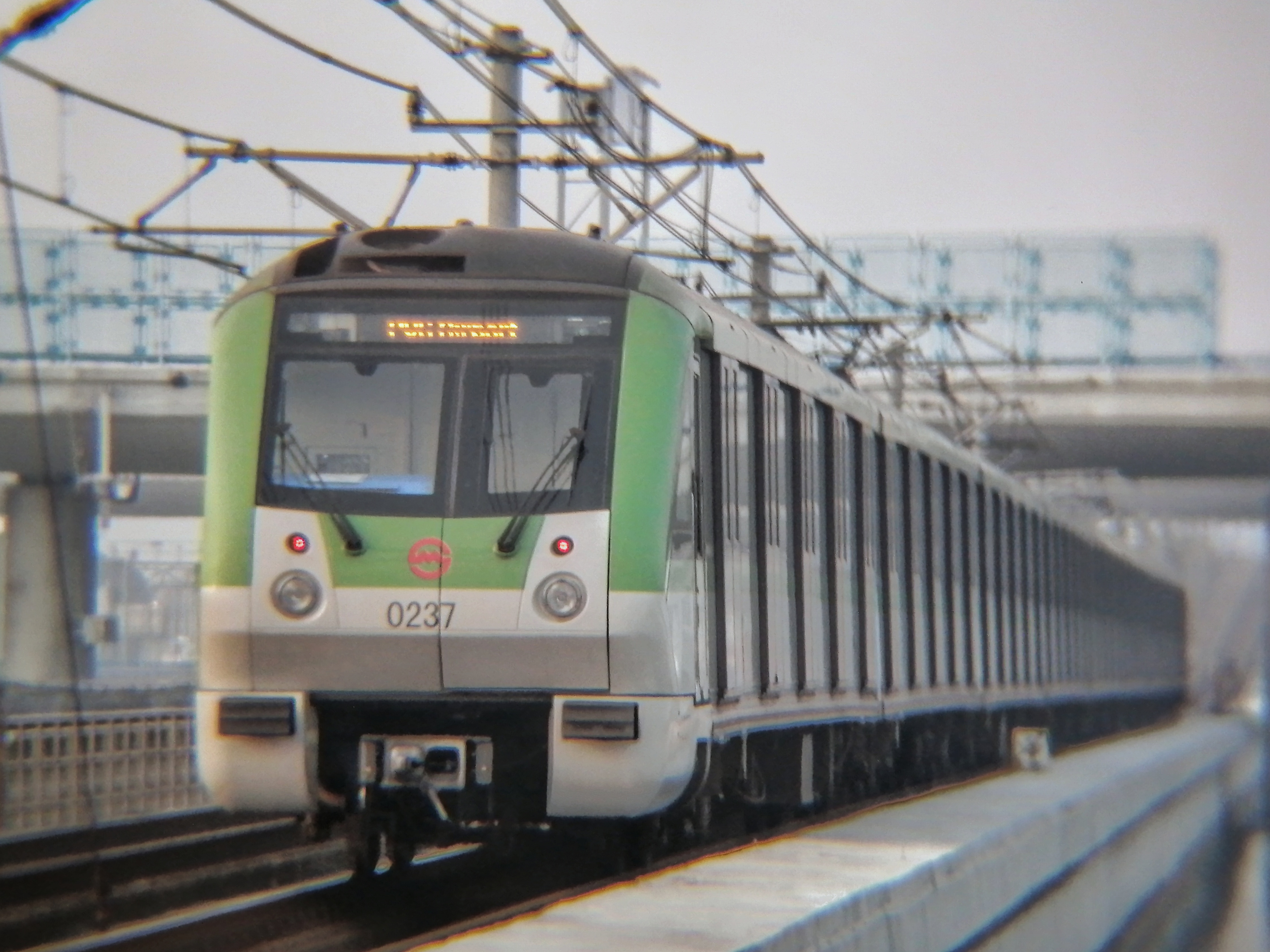
- 02A02 in 2020
- Stock type: Class A EMU
- In service: 28 May 2008-present
- Manufacturer: Alstom and CSR Nanjing Puzhen
- Built at: Nanjing and Shanghai, China
- Family name: Metropolis
- Constructed: 2007-2009
- Entered service: 28 May 2008
- Number built: 168
- Number in service: 168
- Formation: Tc-Mp-M-Mp+Mp-M-Mp-Tc
- Fleet numbers: 021291-022961
- Capacity: 310 per car
- Operators: Shentong Metro Group
- Depots: Beidi Road Depot; Longyang Road Depot; Chuansha Yard
- Lines served: 2

Specifications
- Car body construction: Aluminum alloy
- Train length: 139.98 m (459 ft 3 in)
- Car length: 23.54 m (77 ft 3 in)
- Width: 3 m (9 ft 10 in)
- Height: 3.8 m (12 ft 6 in)
- Doors: Electric doors
- Maximum speed: 80 km/h (50 mph)
- Traction system: Alstom ONIX 1500 IGBT-VVVF
- Traction motors: Alstom 4LCA-2138 3-phases AC induction motors
- Acceleration: Maximum 0.9 km/(h⋅s) (0.559 mph/s)
- Deceleration: 1 km/(h⋅s) (0.621 mph/s) (service); 1.3 km/(h⋅s) (0.808 mph/s) (emergency)
- Electric system(s): 1,500 V DC
- Current collection: Single-arm Pantograph
- Bogies: Alstom B25
- Safety system(s): CASCO Tranavi (CBTC, DTO/GoA3) and GRS Micro Cabmatic (TBTC, ATO/GoA2)
- Track gauge: 4 ft 8 1/2 in (1,435 mm)

The 02A02 (formerly known as AC08) is a class of electric multiple unit currently used on Line 2 of Shanghai Metro. It was introduced into service in 2008 with the west extension of Line 2. A total of 168 cars were built by Alstom and CSR Nanjing Puzhen.

In 2014, AC08 was renamed as 02A02.

== Description ==
As a part of the west extension program of Line 2, AC08 was ordered at the same time as AC06, but both manufacturing and delivery have been delayed. Since the western extension opened in late 2006, eight AC05 trains have assigned to Line 2 service, until AC08 trains starting delivered between 2008 and 2009.

AC08s have livery mainly in green and white. They are also equipped with upper window LED screens to provide passenger information for the first time. The Alstom ONIX 1500 Variable Frequency (IGBT) inverters like the ones that use the SMRT North East Line Alstom Metropolis C751A trains.

== Signaling upgrade ==
Between 2022 and 2023, 02A02‘s signaling system were retrofitted with DTO (CBTC) operation.
