= East Nanjing Road station =

Shanghai Metro interchange station

East Nanjing Road 南京东路
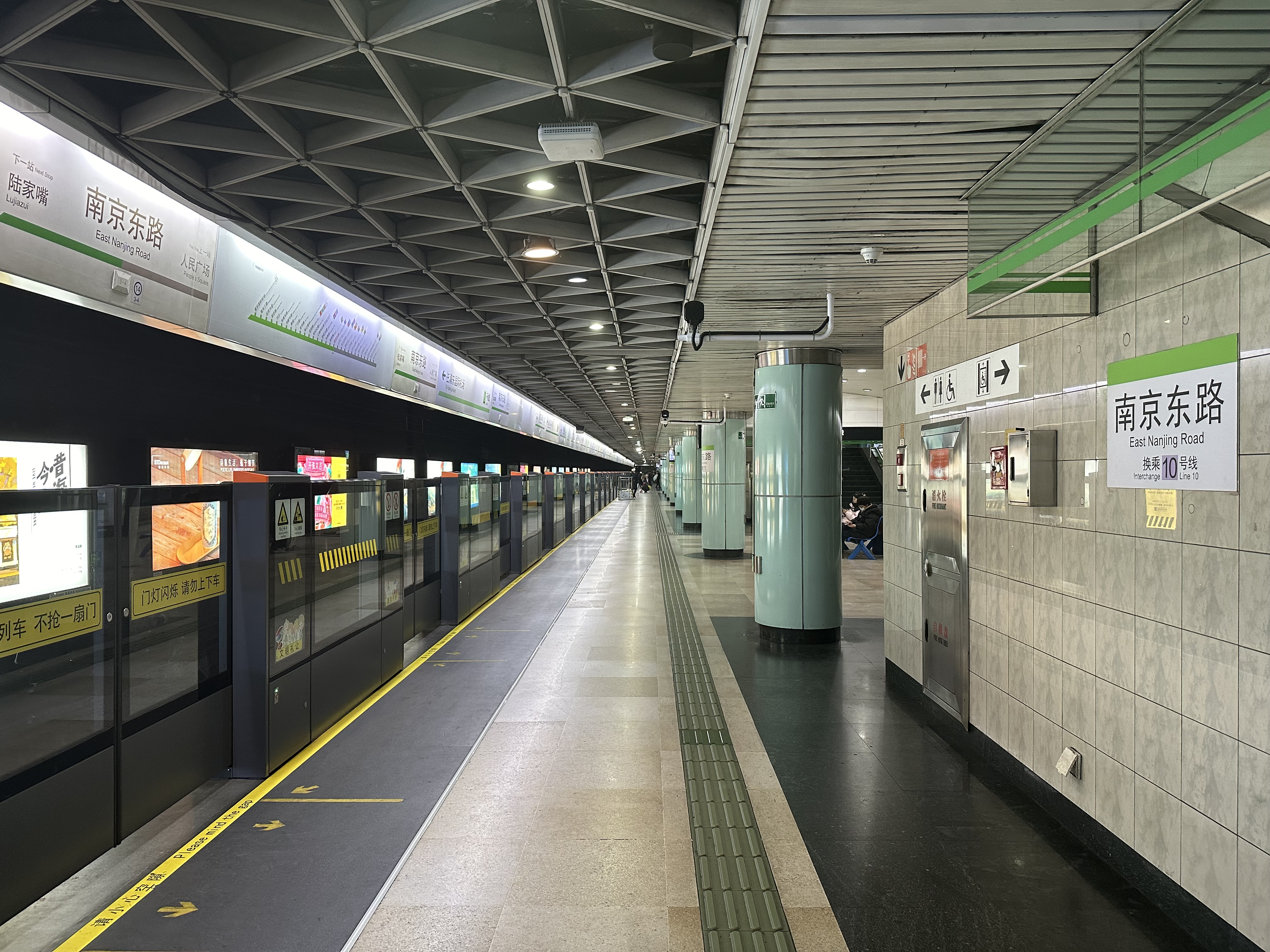
- Line 2 platform

General information
- Location: East Nanjing Road and Middle Henan Road; Huangpu District, Shanghai; China
- Coordinates: 31°14′17″N 121°29′05″E
- Operator: Shanghai No. 1/2 Metro Operation Co. Ltd.
- Lines: Line 2; Line 10
- Platforms: 4 (2 island platforms)
- Tracks: 4

Construction
- Structure type: Underground
- Accessible: Yes

Other information
- Station code: L10/16 (Line 10)

History
- Opened: 20 September 1999 (Line 2); 10 April 2010 (Line 10)
- Former names: Middle Henan Road (up to 28 October 2006)

Services
Preceding station	Shanghai Metro	Following station
People's Square towards Panxiang Road · Shanghai National Accounting Institute	Line 2	Lujiazui towards Pudong Airport Terminal 1&2
Yuyuan Garden towards Hongqiao Railway Station or Hangzhong Road	Line 10	Tiantong Road towards Jilong Road
Location
- Location within Shanghai

East Nanjing Road (Chinese: 南京东路; pinyin: Nánjīng Dōng Lù) is an interchange station between Lines 2 and 10 on the Shanghai Metro. It is located in Huangpu District, under the intersection of Nanjing Road (E.) and Henan Road (M.) in the city center of Shanghai.

During the National Day and other major festivals, Nanjing East Road will close the station during certain periods, and trains will not stop at this station during the closed period.

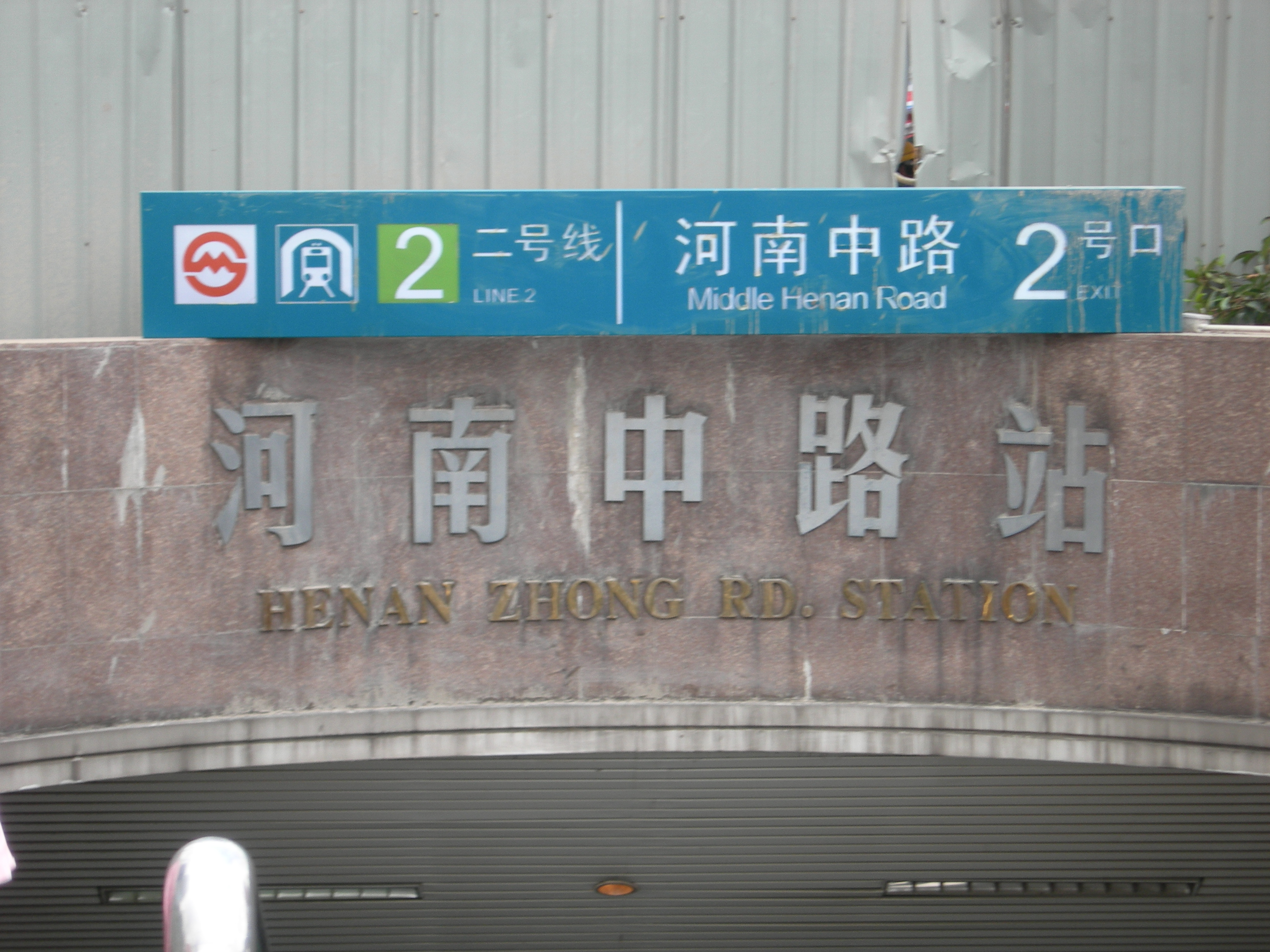
Old sign showing the former name of the station, Middle Henan Road, used before October 2006.

Before October 2006, it was known as Middle Henan Road station. The name was changed according to the new convention to name metro stations after famous streets or sights nearby rather than the vertical street neighbouring the station, making it easier for visitors to find these places.

This station is part of the initial section of Line 2 that opened from Zhongshan Park to Longyang Road that opened on 20 September 1999. The interchange with the main branch of Line 10 section of the station opened on 10 April 2010.

== Station layout ==
1F	Ground level	Exits
B1	Line 2 concourse	Tickets, Service Center
B1	Line 10 concourse	Tickets, Service Center
B2	Platform 1	← Line 2 towards Panxiang Road · Shanghai National Accounting Institute (People's Square)
B2	Island platform, doors open on the left
B2	Platform 2	Line 2 towards Pudong Airport Terminal 1&2 (Lujiazui) →
B3	Platform 3	← Line 10 towards Hongqiao Railway Station or Hangzhong Road (Yuyuan Garden)
B3	Island platform, doors open on the left
B3	Platform 4	Line 10 towards Jilong Road (Tiantong Road) →

=== Entrances/exits ===
East Nanjing Road has seven exits.

- 1: Nanjing Road (E), Shanxi Road (S)
- 2: Henan Road (M), Nanjing Road (E)
- 3: Nanjing Road (E), Shandong Road (M)
- 4: Shanxi Road (S), Jiujiang Road
- 5: Henan Road (M), Tianjin Road
- 6: Henan Road (M), Ningbo Road, Tianjin Road
- 7: Henan Road (M), Tianjin Road

== Places nearby ==
- Nanjing Road (E.) - a pedestrian-only shopping street
- Fuzhou Road with many bookstores
- The Bund - overlooking the Huangpu River
- Renji Hospital (West Part)
- Holy Trinity Cathedral, Shanghai
