= Songhong Road station =

Shanghai Metro station

Songhong Road 淞虹路
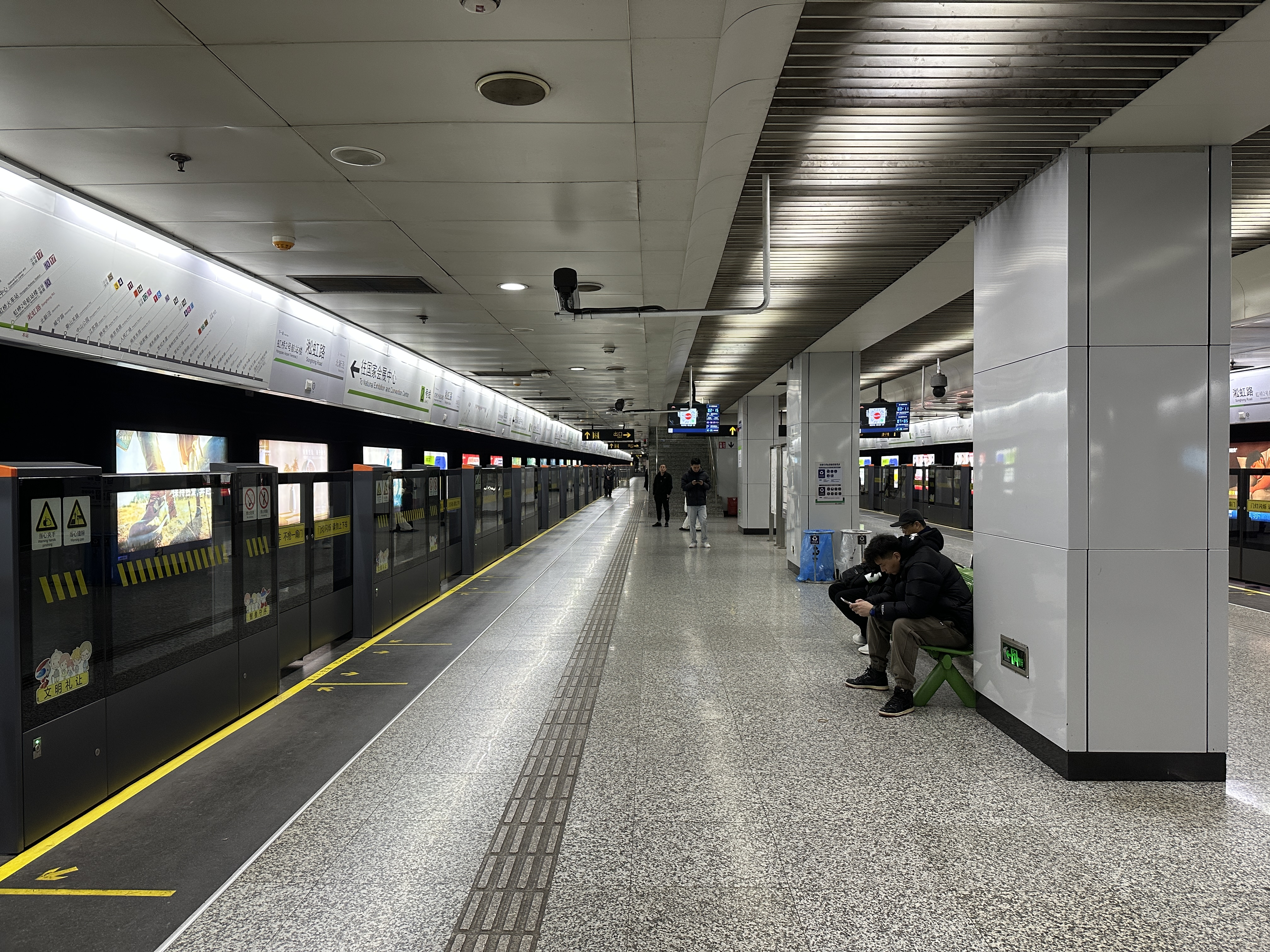
- Station platform

General information
- Location: West Tianshan Road (天山西路) and Songhong Road (淞虹路); Changning District, Shanghai; China
- Coordinates: 31°13′06″N 121°21′35″E
- Operator: Shanghai No. 2 Metro Operation Co. Ltd.
- Line: Line 2
- Platforms: 2 (1 island platform)
- Tracks: 2

Construction
- Structure type: Underground
- Accessible: Yes

Other information
- Station code: L02/27

History
- Opened: 30 December 2006

Services
Preceding station	Shanghai Metro	Following station
Hongqiao Airport Terminal 2 towards Panxiang Road · Shanghai National Accounting Institute	Line 2	Beixinjing towards Pudong Airport Terminal 1&2
Location
- Location within Shanghai

Songhong Road (Chinese: 淞虹路; pinyin: Sōnghóng Lù) is a station on Line 2 of the Shanghai Metro in Changning District. The station served as the western terminus of the line from 30 December 2006, when Line 2 was extended westward from Zhongshan Park, until 16 March 2010, when the second westward extension to the current terminus at East Xujing opened. The station is still often used as a terminus for west-bound trains meaning passengers have to disembark and wait for another train for the remainder of the journey.
