= Century Park (Shanghai) =

Park in Shanghai, China

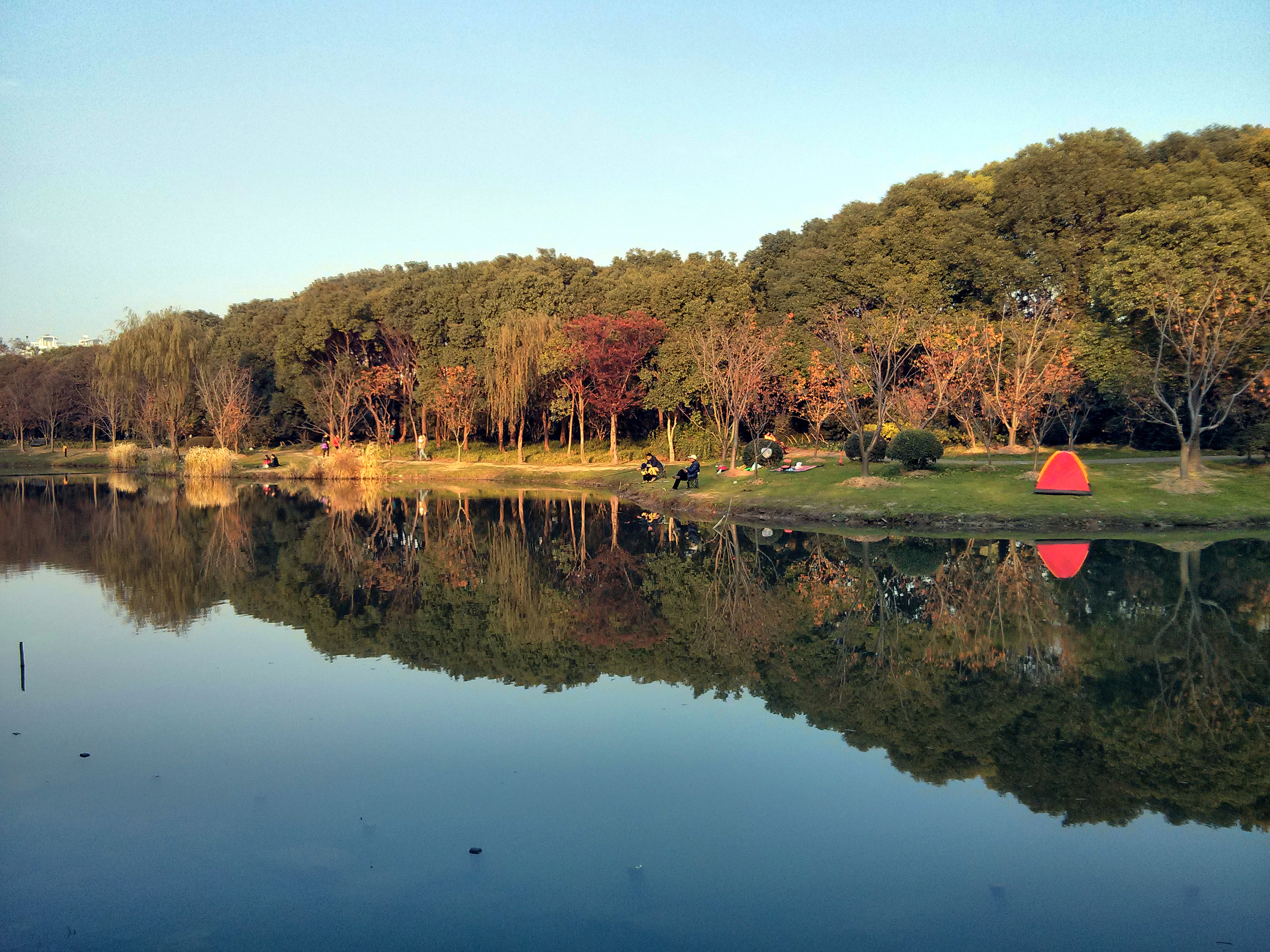
- People Fishing in Century Park
- Interactive map of Century Park
- Type: Urban park
- Location: Huamu Subdistrict, Pudong New District, Shanghai, China
- Coordinates: 31.2180°N 121.5469°E
- Area: 140.3 hectares (347 acres; 1.403 km^{2})
- Created: 1996–2000
- Operator: Shanghai Century Park Mgmt Co., Ltd. (上海世纪公园管理有限公司)
- Open: 24 hours
- Public transit: Subway and bus

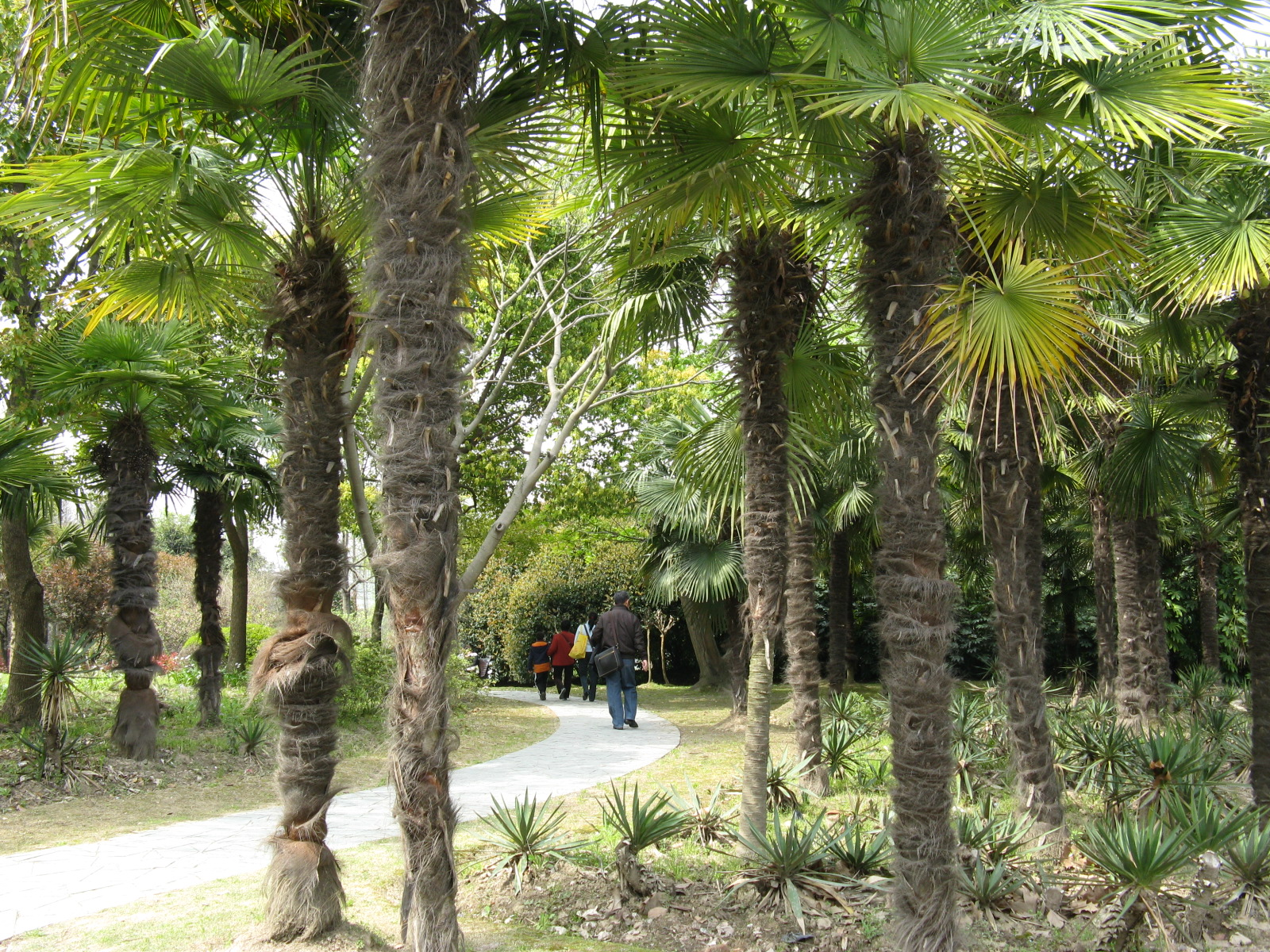

Century Park (simplified Chinese: 世纪公园; traditional Chinese: 世紀公園; pinyin: Shìjì Gōngyuán; Shanghainese: Sy-ci Kon-yoe) is the largest park in Shanghai, located at the end of Century Avenue on Jinxiu Road, in the Pudong New Area of Shanghai, near the Shanghai Science and Technology Museum.

It was designed by the British environmental consultancy LUC and was built in four years from 1996 to 2000.

Century is 140 hectares (350 acres) and lies to the south of Century Boulevard (世纪大道).

Century Park is divided into seven parts, the Lakeside Scenic Area, the Forest Landscape Area, the Amenity Grass, the Nature Reserve, the Folk Village, the Exotic Zone, and the Mini Golf Course.
