= Jinke Road station =

Shanghai Metro station

Jinke Road 金科路
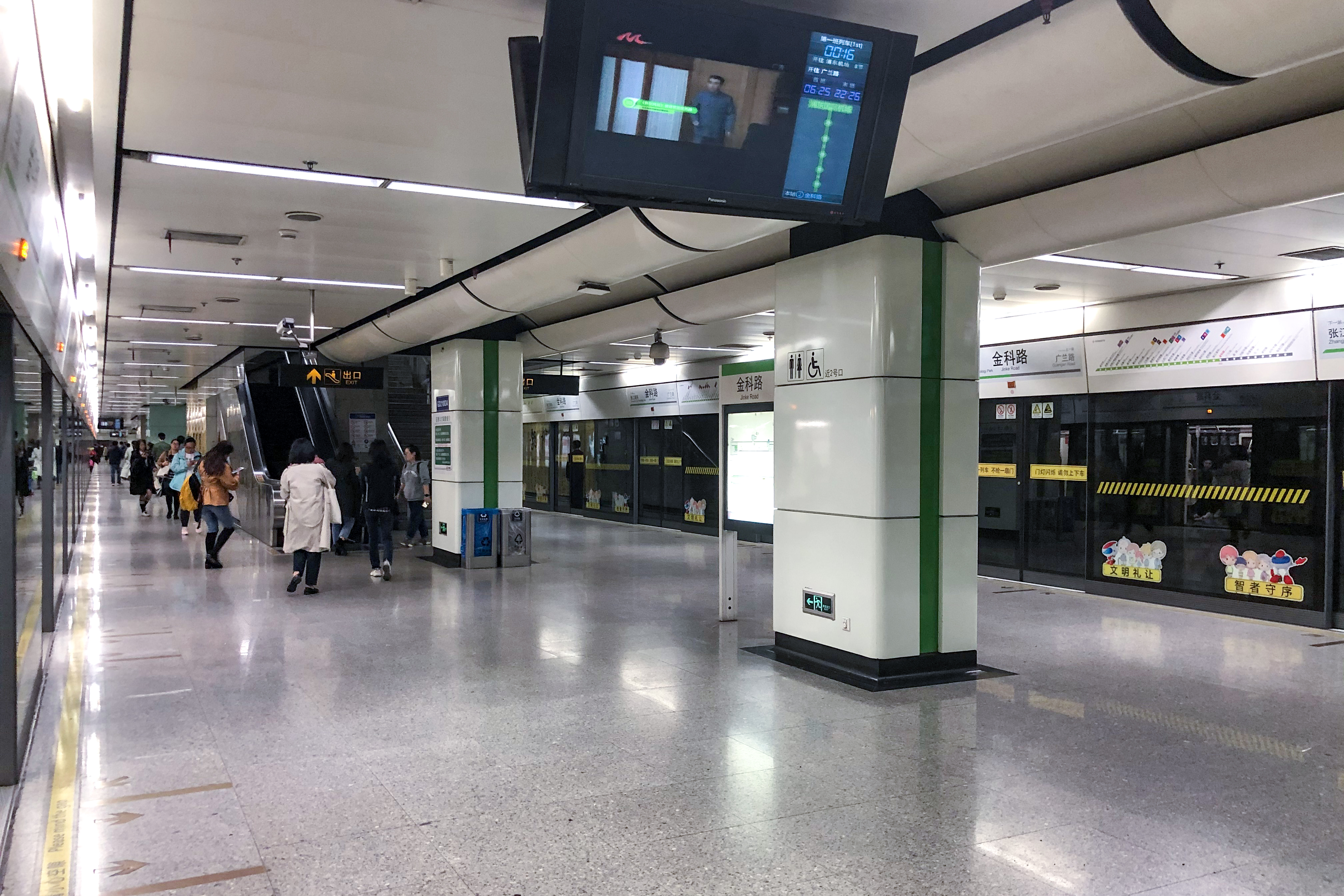
- Station platform

General information
- Location: Zuchongzhi Road and Jinke Road; Pudong, Shanghai; China
- Coordinates: 31°12′14″N 121°36′05″E
- Operator: Shanghai No. 2 Metro Operation Co. Ltd.
- Line: Line 2
- Platforms: 2 (1 island platform)
- Tracks: 2

Construction
- Structure type: Underground
- Accessible: Yes

Other information
- Station code: L02/10

History
- Opened: February 24, 2010

Services
Preceding station	Shanghai Metro	Following station
Zhangjiang Hi-Tech Park towards Panxiang Road · Shanghai National Accounting Institute	Line 2	Guanglan Road towards Pudong Airport Terminal 1&2
Location
- Location within Shanghai

Jinke Road (Chinese: 金科路; pinyin: Jīnkē Lù) is a station on Line 2 of the Shanghai Metro. Located along Zuchongzhi Road just east of its intersection with Jinke Road, the station is located between the Zhangjiang Hi-Tech Park and Guanglan Road stations. This station, with four exits, is part of the eastern extension of Line 2 from the Zhangjiang Hi-Tech Park station, and opened February 24, 2010.

== History ==
By 2008, the Line 2 terminated at the Zhangjiang Hi-Tech Park station. On February 24, 2010, the line was expanded from that station through the Jinke Road station to Guanglan Road, which was the formal opening of this station. The extension extended the line to about 29 kilometres (18 mi) which now included 19 stations. The entire metro increased its length to around 335 kilometres (208 mi) which included 223 stations. The opening of Jinke Road alleviated traffic away from the Zhangjiang Hi-Tech Park station and for those commuting to the nearby Pudong Software Park. The extension also included a rebuilding of the Zhangjiang Hi-Tech Park station from February 14 to February 23 to improve power supply and other equipment. Two months later, the line was extended past the station through Tangzhen, Middle Chuangxin Road, East Huaxia Road, Chuansha, Lingkong Road, Yuandong Avenue, and Haitiansan Road stations to the Pudong International Airport station, which serves the Shanghai Pudong International Airport.

== Facilities ==
The station is an island platform with two tracks, one eastbound and one westbound, on either side. The station is located in Shanghai's Pudong New Area, along Zuchongzhi Road between intersections at Jinke Road and Halei Road. Roughly shaped like a rectangle, the station has four exits, two on one end, one at the other and one which exits into the Changtai Plaza (长泰广场) shopping center. On the west end are Exits 2 and 3, and on the east side is Exit 1. Exit 4 is in the middle on the north side and leads to the neighboring Changtai Plaza. The station is served by bus routes 609 and 636.

== Service ==
Along Line 2, the Jinke Road station is located between the Zhangjiang Hi-Tech Park and Guanglan Road. It takes approximately 55 minutes to ride the train to the East Xujing, the western terminus, and about 35 minutes to ride to Pudong International Airport, the east end. The train operates from 5:33 to 22:48 westbound and from 6:25 to 23:40 eastbound. On weekdays, trains leave the station approximately every 3 minutes and 30 seconds during peak hours and every four to ten minutes during non-peak hours. Peak hours are defined as from 7:30 to 9:30 and 17:00 to 19:00 on Monday through Thursday, as well as 7:00 to 9:00 and 12:50 to 20:30 on Friday. On weekends, trains leave the stations every 4 minutes and 5 seconds from 8:00 to 20:30, and every five to ten minutes during other times.
