= East Huaxia Road station =

Shanghai Metro station

East Huaxia Road 华夏东路
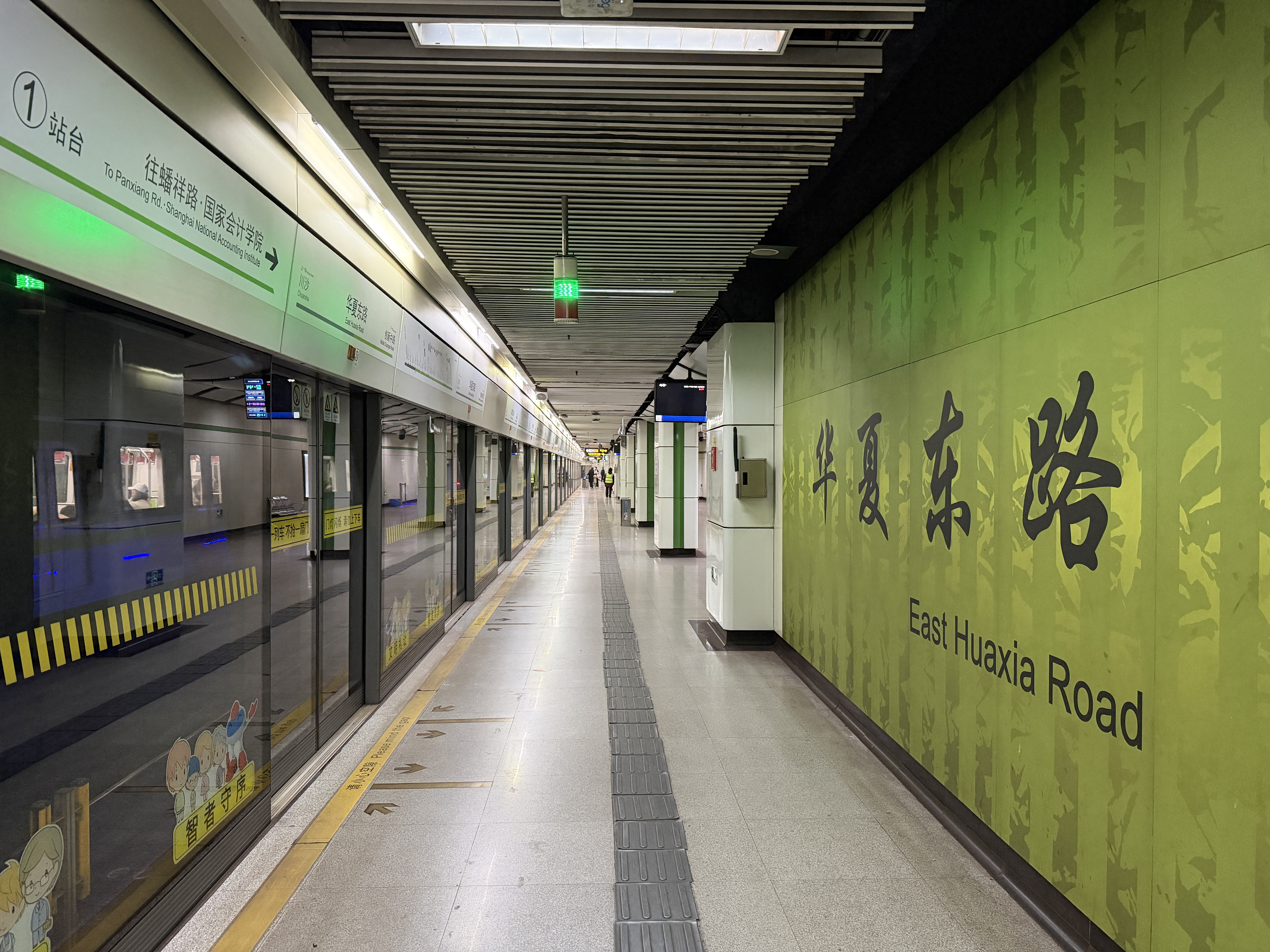
- View of the underground platform of the station.

General information
- Location: Pudong, Shanghai; China
- Coordinates: 31°11′48″N 121°40′52″E
- Operator: Shanghai No. 2 Metro Operation Co. Ltd.
- Line: Line 2
- Platforms: 2 (2 side platforms)
- Tracks: 2

Construction
- Structure type: Underground
- Accessible: Yes

Other information
- Station code: L02/06

History
- Opened: April 8, 2010

Services
| Preceding station | Shanghai Metro | Following station |
|---|---|---|
| Middle Chuangxin Road towards Panxiang Road · Shanghai National Accounting Institute | Line 2 | Chuansha towards Pudong Airport Terminal 1&2 |
Location
- Location within Shanghai

East Huaxia Road (Chinese: 华夏东路; pinyin: Huáxià Dōng Lù) is a station on Line 2 of the Shanghai Metro. Located along the Huaxia Elevated Road, it is between the Middle Chuangxin Road and Chuansha stations on Line 2. It came into operation on April 8, 2010 as part of an eastward extension from Guanglan Road to Pudong International Airport.

== Location and station layout ==
The station is located beneath Third Huaxia Road, between Qingyi Road (青艺路) and the Huaxia Elevated Road. Along Line 2, it is located between the Middle Chuangxin Road and Chuansha stations. It takes about 20 minutes to ride the train to the Pudong International Airport, the eastern terminus of the line, and about 70 minutes to East Xujing, the west end. The station has three exits, numbered 1, 4, and 5. Exit 1 is branched northeast of the station, south of the Huaxia Elevated Road and east of Third Huaxia Road. Along the northwest side of the station is Exit 4 which is located west of Third Huaxia Road. Exit 5 is located south of Qingyi Road east of the station.

== History ==
By early March 2010, line 2 had been completed through Guanglan Road. On April 8, the line was extended past the station through the Tangzhen, and Middle Chuangxin Road stations, through East Huaxia Road, as well as the Chuansha, Lingkong Road, Yuandong Avenue, and Haitiansan Road stations to Pudong International Airport station, which serves the Shanghai Pudong International Airport. This extension originally used four-carriage trains as opposed to the eight-carriage trains used west of Guanglan Road, which served as the transfer point until eight-carriage through trains were introduced in April 2019.
