= Lingkong Road station =

Shanghai Metro station

Lingkong Road 凌空路
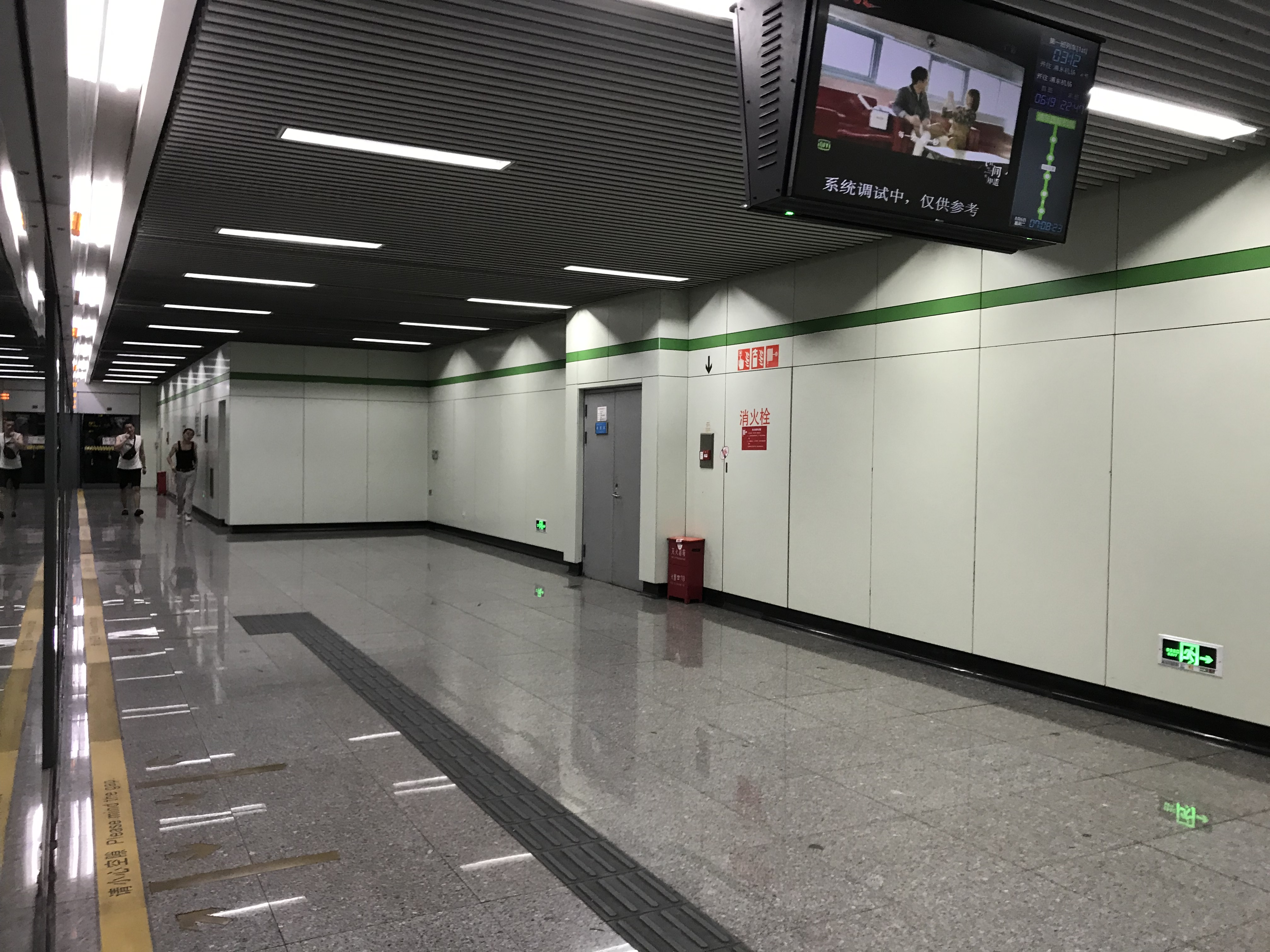

General information
- Location: Chuanxinsha, Pudong, Shanghai; China
- Coordinates: 31°11′34″N 121°43′26″E
- Operator: Shanghai No. 2 Metro Operation Co. Ltd.
- Line: Line 2
- Platforms: 2 (2 side platforms)
- Tracks: 2

Construction
- Structure type: Underground
- Accessible: Yes

Other information
- Station code: L02/04

History
- Opened: 8 April 2010

Services
Preceding station	Shanghai Metro	Following station
Chuansha towards Panxiang Road · Shanghai National Accounting Institute	Line 2	Yuandong Avenue towards Pudong Airport Terminal 1&2
Location
- Location within Shanghai

Lingkong Road (Chinese: 凌空路; pinyin: Língkōng Lù) is a station on Line 2 of the Shanghai Metro in the town of Chuanshaxin, Pudong. This station is part of the eastward extension from Guanglan Road to Pudong International Airport that opened on 8 April 2010.

== History ==
Construction on Line 2 was finished through Guanglan Road by March 2010. On April 8 that same year, Line 2 was extended past the station through the Tangzhen, Middle Chuangxin Road, and Chuansha stations, through the Lingkong Road station, as well as the Yuandong Avenue and Haitiansan Road stations to Pudong International Airport station, which serves Shanghai Pudong International Airport. This extension originally used four-carriage trains as opposed to the eight-carriage trains used west of Guanglan Road, which served as the transfer point until eight-carriage through trains were introduced in April 2019.

== Facilities ==
The station is located in the town of Chuanxinsha in Pudong. The station, shaped like an oblong rectangle, is nestled at the corner of its namesake road and West Huazhou Road (华洲西路). There are three exits, numbered 3, 4 and 5. Exit 3 is the only one located south of the line, reaching surface level near Huazhou Road. Exit 4 is located nearer to Lingkong Road than exit 5, both of which are located north of the line. Located beneath a small farm amid the city, the station is close to the Taiping Market.

== Service ==
Along Line 2, the station is located between Chuansha and Yuandong Avenue. It takes approximately 80 minutes to ride the train to East Xujing, the west end of the line, and 15 minutes to Pudong International Airport, the eastern terminus. The train operates from 6:45 to 21:15 westbound and begins and ends service four minutes later eastbound. On weekdays, trains leave the station approximately every eight minutes and thirty seconds.
