= Zhangjiang High Technology Park station =

Shanghai Metro station

Zhangjiang High Technology Park 张江高科
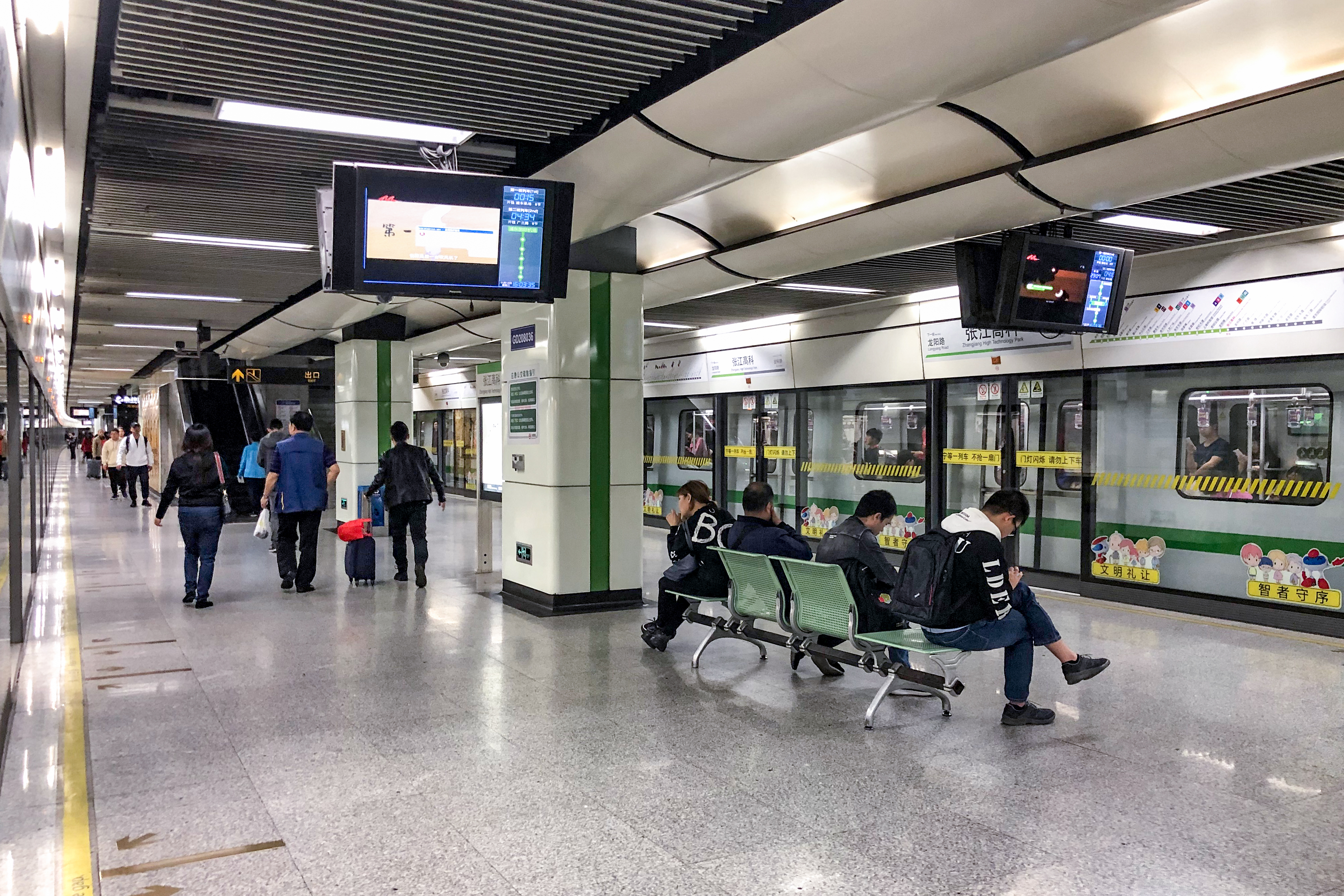
- Station platform

General information
- Location: Zuchongzhi Road, Songtao Road (松涛路) and Keyuan Road (科苑路); Zhangjiang Hi-Tech Park, Pudong, Shanghai; China
- Coordinates: 31°12′07″N 121°35′18″E
- Operator: Shanghai No. 2 Metro Operation Co. Ltd.
- Line: Line 2
- Platforms: 2 (1 island platform)
- Tracks: 2

Construction
- Structure type: Underground
- Accessible: Yes

Other information
- Station code: L02/11

History
- Opened: 27 December 2000 (Elevated station); 24 February 2010 (Underground station)
- Closed: 14 February 2010 (Elevated station)

Services
Preceding station	Shanghai Metro	Following station
Longyang Road towards Panxiang Road · Shanghai National Accounting Institute	Line 2	Jinke Road towards Pudong Airport Terminal 1&2
Location
- Location within Shanghai

Zhangjiang High Technology Park (Chinese: 张江高科; pinyin: Zhāngjiāng Gāokē) is a station on Line 2 of the Shanghai Metro. This station had been the line's eastern terminus from 27 December 2000, after an eastward extension from Longyang Road to Zhangjiang High Technology Park opened, until 24 February 2010, when the line was extended further eastward to Guanglan Road. From 14 to 23 February 2010, this station was shut down, and Line 2 service terminated at Longyang Road, to allow for reconstruction work; the new underground Zhangjiang Hi-Tech Park station was built on the northeast side of the old, elevated station. This conversion allowed for greater compatibility with the 24 February 2010 opening of Jinke Road and Guanglan Road stations, which are both underground.

== Gallery ==
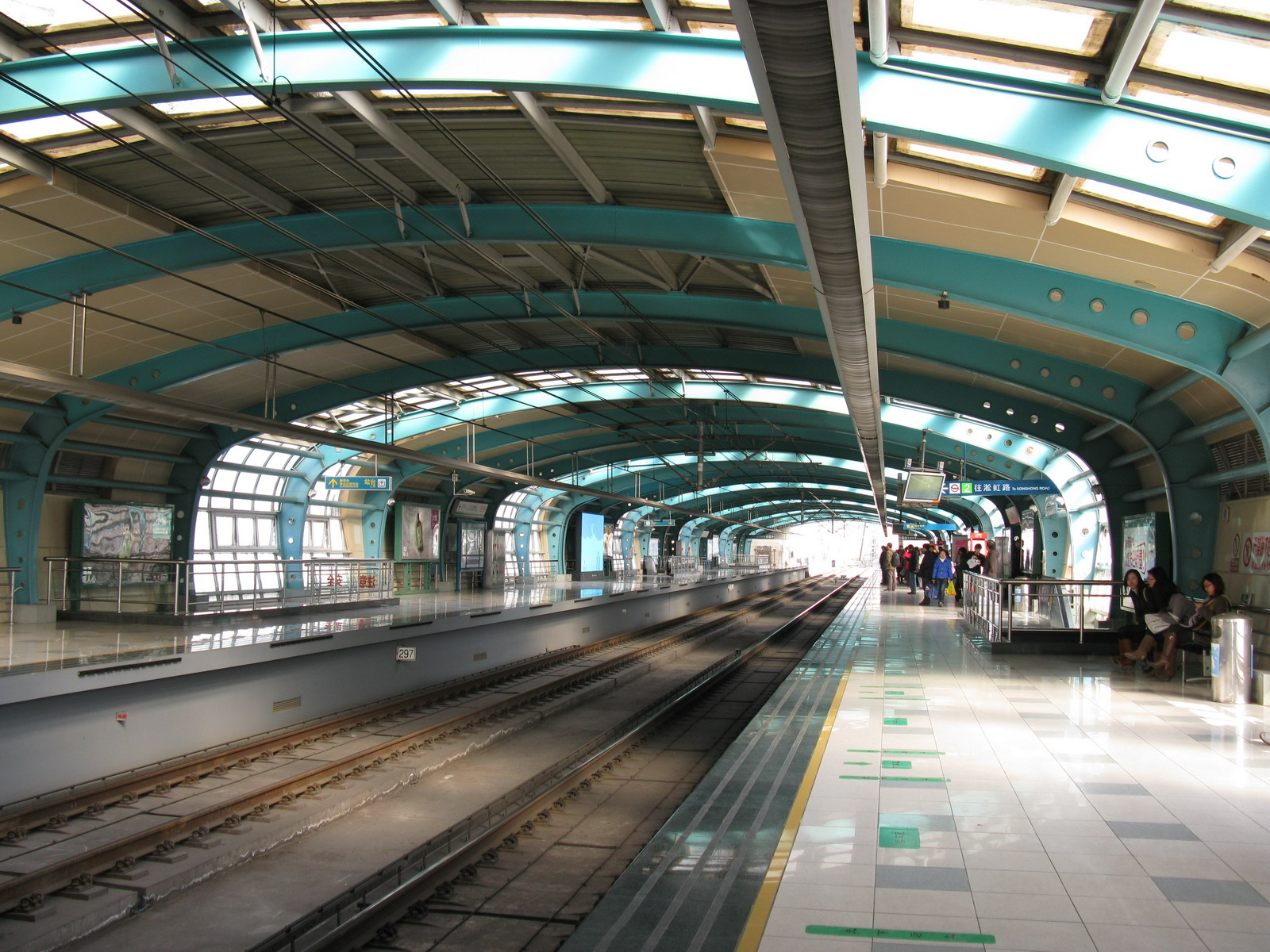
Side platforms of the former elevated station

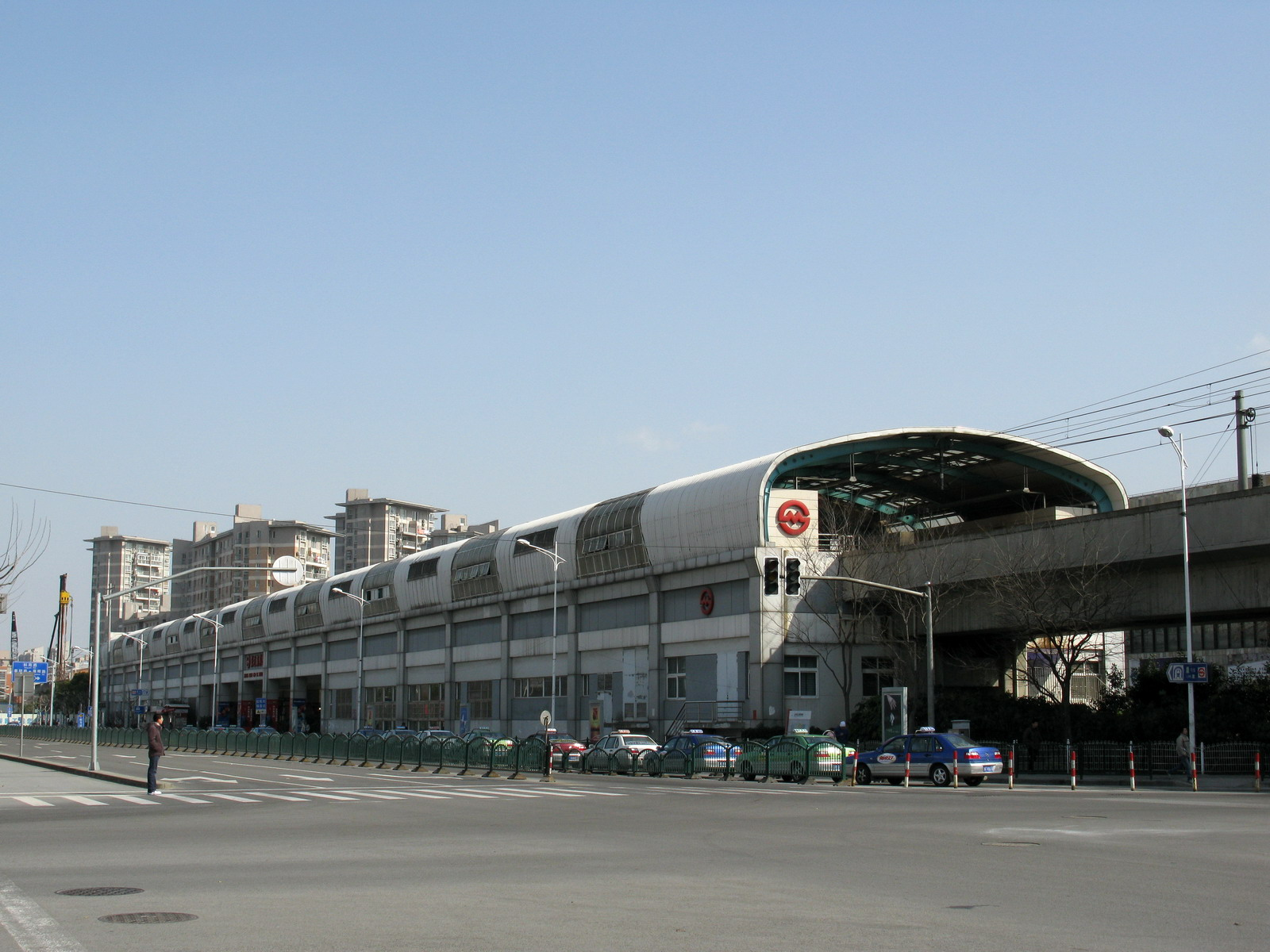
Exterior of the former elevated station

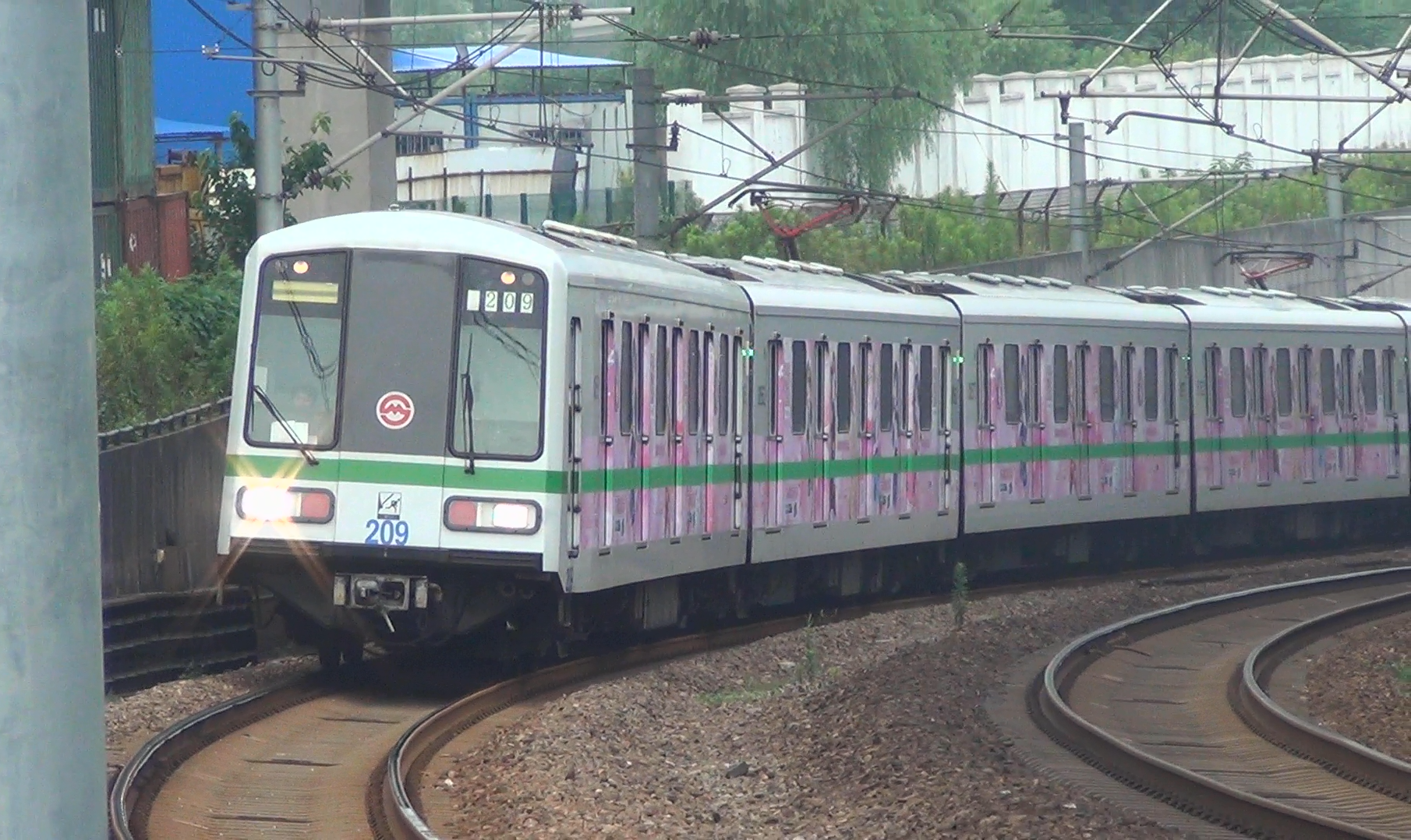
AC02 car in Love Live! livery between Longyang Road and Zhangjiang Hi-Tech Park stations, when the latter was still elevated

== Places nearby ==
- Zhangjiang High-Tech Park
