= Chuansha station =

Shanghai Metro station

Chuansha 川沙
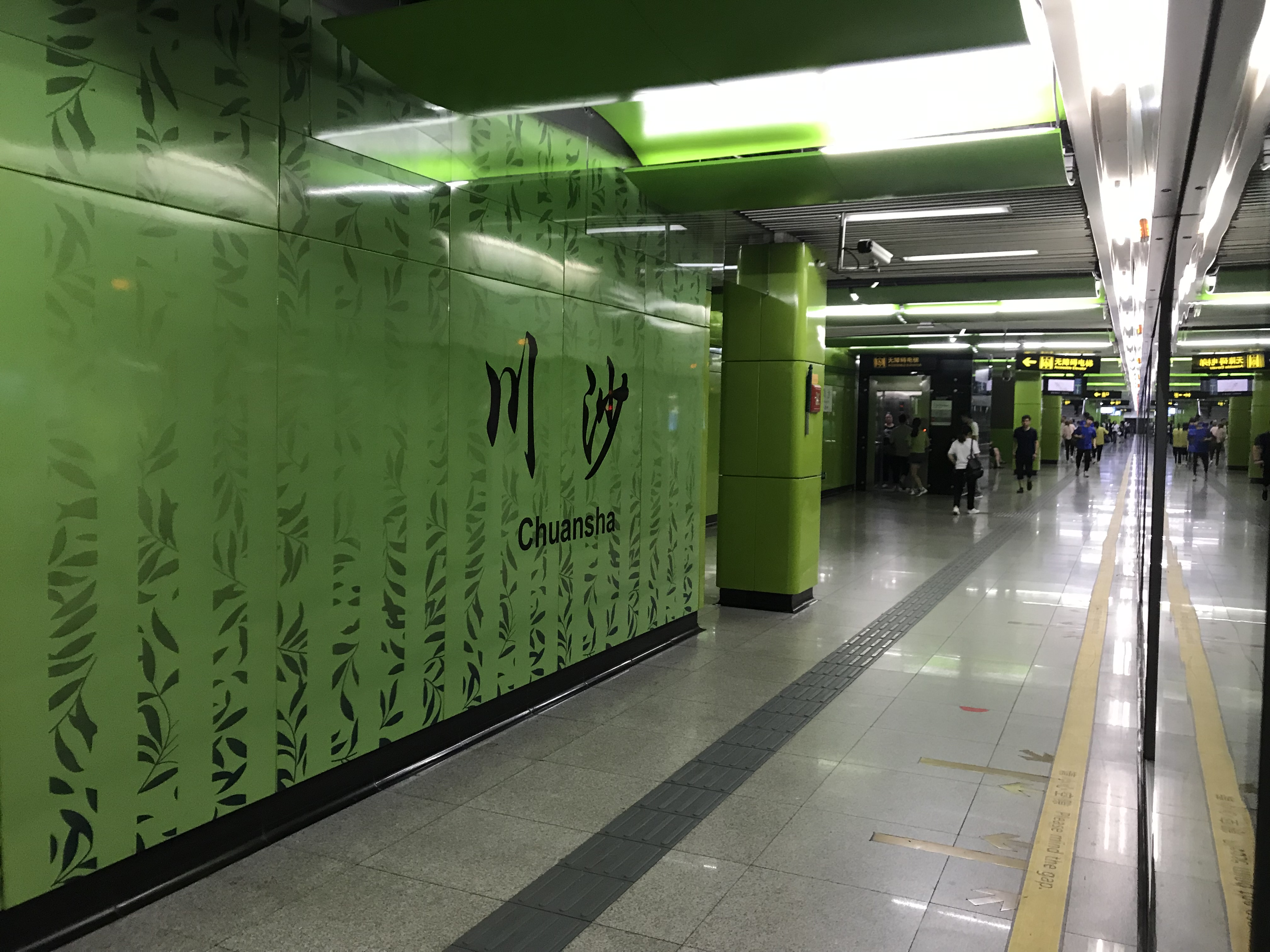
- Station platform

General information
- Location: South Chuanhuan Road (川环南路) and Chuansha Road (川沙路); Chuanxinsha, Pudong, Shanghai; China
- Coordinates: 31°11′11″N 121°41′52″E
- Operator: Shanghai No. 2 Metro Operation Co. Ltd.
- Line: Line 2
- Platforms: 2 (2 side platforms)
- Tracks: 2

Construction
- Structure type: Underground
- Accessible: Yes

Other information
- Station code: L02/05

History
- Opened: 8 April 2010

Services
Preceding station	Shanghai Metro	Following station
East Huaxia Road towards Panxiang Road · Shanghai National Accounting Institute	Line 2	Lingkong Road towards Pudong Airport Terminal 1&2
Location
- Location within Shanghai

Chuansha (Chinese: 川沙; pinyin: Chuānshā) is a station on Line 2 of the Shanghai Metro, located in the town of Chuanxinsha, Pudong. This station is part of the eastward extension from Guanglan Road to Pudong International Airport that opened on 8 April 2010.
