= Zhangjiang Hi-Tech Park =

Zhangjing Hi-Tech Park 张江高科技园区
- Town
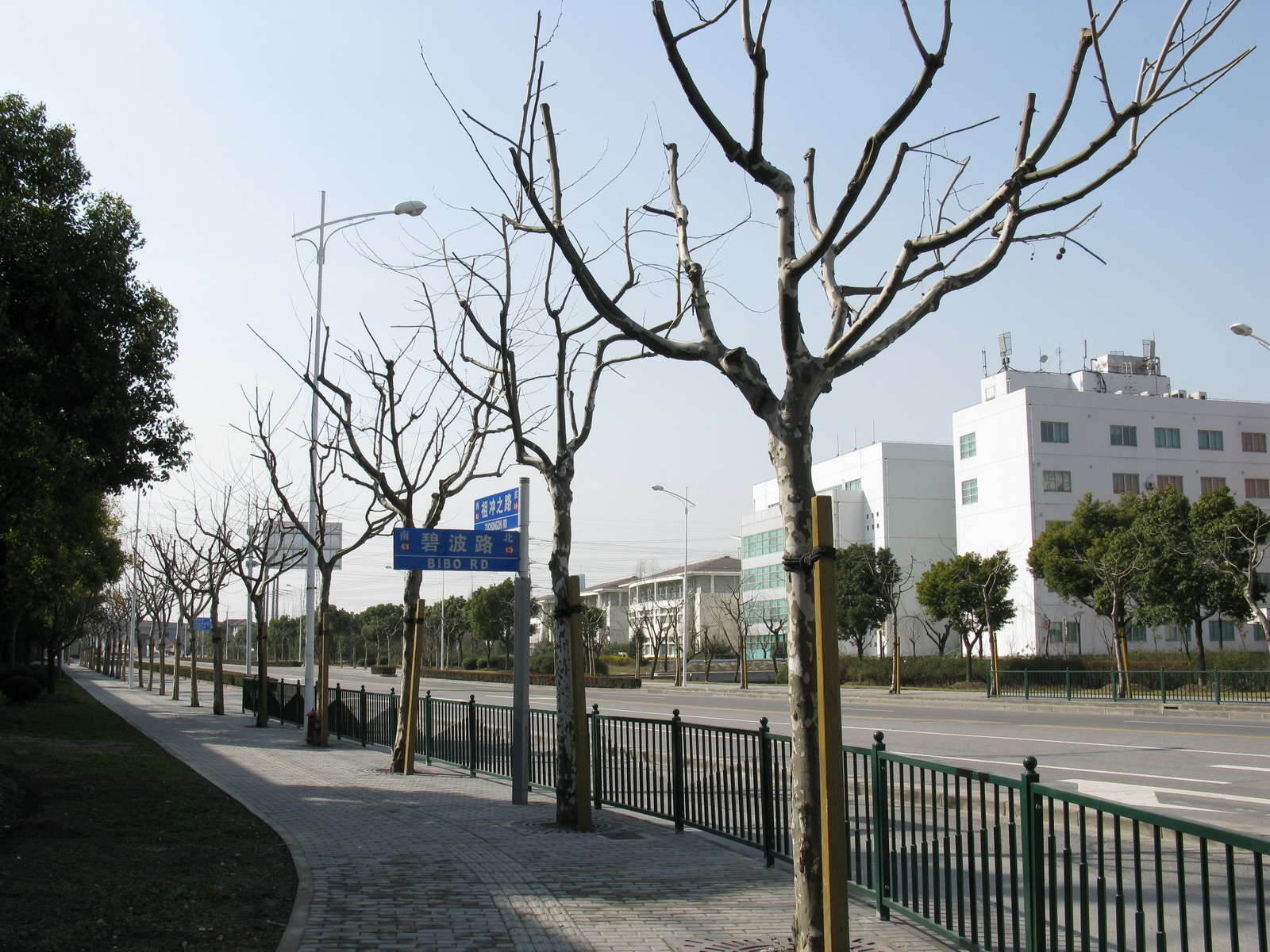
- Zhangjiang Hi-Tech Park
- Coordinates (Zhangjiang People's Government): 31.205301°N 121.614268°E
- Country: China
- Municipality: Shanghai
- District: Pudong New Area
- Established: November 2001

Government
  - Wang Qing: Secretary of Party Committee
  - Li Can: Town Mayor

Area
  - Total: 42.96 km^{2} (16.59 sq mi)
  - Land: 38.89 km^{2} (15.02 sq mi)
  - Water: 4.07 km^{2} (1.57 sq mi)

Population (2024)
  - Total: 265,000
  - Density: 6,810/km^{2} (17,600/sq mi)
- Postal code: 201210
- Area code: 021

Zhangjiang Hi-Tech Park
- Simplified Chinese: 张江高科技园区
- Traditional Chinese: 張江高科技園區
Transcriptions
Standard Mandarin
- Hanyu Pinyin: Zhāngjiāng Gāokējì Yuánqū

The Zhangjiang Hi-Tech Park is a technology park in the Pudong district of Shanghai, China. It is operated by Zhangjiang Hi-Tech Park Development Co., Ltd. The park specializes in research in life sciences, software, semiconductors, and information technology.

As of 2009, there were 110 research and development institutions, 3,600 companies and 100,000 workers located in the technology park. In some circles the park is also known as China's Silicon Valley.

== History ==
The Zhangjiang Hi-Tech Park was established in July 1992. It is situated in the Pudong New Area with a total area of 25 km^{2} (9.7 sq mi). In 2018, it has bases such as the National Shanghai Biomedical Science and Technology Industry Base, National Information Industry Base, National Integrated Circuit Industry Base, National Semiconductor Lighting Industry Base, National 863 Information Security Fruit Industrialization (Eastern) Base, National Software Industry Base, National Software Export Base, National Cultural Industry Model Base, National Online Games and Animation Industry Development Base. It also has the parks National Torch Entrepreneurship Park and National Overseas Student Pioneering Park. The park is made up of the following areas: the Technical Innovation Zone, the Hi-Tech Industry Zone, the Scientific Research and Education Zone, and the Residential Zone.

The park's center area now has 400 research and development institutions. In 2013, Shanda opened sales of a real estate investment project in the park and accepted payment for apartments with bitcoin. Shanda World opened in the park in 2018.

In August 1999, the Shanghai Municipal Committee and Municipal Government developed a strategy and accompanying report called "Focus on Zhangjiang." The report identified that investments from the IC industry, the software industry, and the biomedical industry would be targeted. They were seen as the industries which should have leading roles in innovation and that would drive future economic growth and higher employment in Zhangjiang Town and the Hi-Tech Park.

The park is classified as a Special Economic Zone.

== Presence ==
Major companies that have a presence in the park include life science firms GSK, Roche, Eli Lilly, Pfizer, Novartis, GE, and AstraZeneca. Internet technology firms include Hewlett-Packard, Lenovo, Intel, and Infineon. Software firms include IBM, Citibank, eBay, Tata Consultancy Services, Infosys, and SAP AG. Chemical companies include Wison Group, DSM, Henkel, Dow, Dupont, and Rohm and Haas. Semiconductor firms include Semiconductor Manufacturing International Corporation (SMIC), Hua Hong NEC, Grace Semiconductor, Spreadtrum, and VeriSilicon. Other firms present include Asia-Pacific Software, Sony, Bearing Point, Kyocera, Cognizant, TCS China, Satyam and Applied Materials. There are also a multitude of biotech firms, over a hundred of them being domestically owned companies.

The 2013 founded ShanghaiTech University aims to be the academic center of the Zhanghjiang Hi-Tech Park, alongside satellite campuses of Fudan University and Shanghai Jiao Tong University.

== Location ==
Road links

Zhangjiang Hi-Tech Park can be reached via the inner or outer ring roads that serve the Shanghai metropolitan area. The park is 3.6 km from Nanpu Bridge and 13 km from People's Square. It is 9 km from The Bund.

Longdong Avenue on the park's northern boundary is the main road connecting the inner ring road and Shanghai Pudong International Airport. Luonan Avenue on the park's western boundary is the feeder road connecting the inner ring road and outer ring road.

Air links

Zhangjiang Hi-Tech Park is located in the Pudong district. It is 21 km from Pudong Airport and 25 km from Hongqiao Airport.

Rail links

Zhangjiang Hi-Tech Park can be reached by taking Line 2 of the Shanghai Metro to Zhangjiang Hi-Tech Park, Jinke Road, or Guanglan Road. Line 13 goes through the center of Zhangjiang, stopping at Zhongke Road, Xuelin Road, Zhangjiang Road, and in the future, Middle Gaoke Road and Dangui Road. Line 21 will also run through Zhangjiang after completion. The Zhangjiang Tram system, which runs inside the zone and connects to the metro lines, was available from 2007-2023.
