= Biyun Green Space =

Green space in Shanghai, China

Biyun Green Space, also known as the Zhangjiabang Wedge-shaped Green Space, is a wedge-shaped urban green area located in Shanghai's Pudong New Area, China.

The green space extends east to the Shanghai Outer Avenue, south to Longdong Avenue, west to Jinke Road, and north to Jinxiu East Road.

Biyun Green Space is surrounded by the Jinqiao Sub-center and Zhangjiang Science City.

Covering a total area of approximately 344 hectares, the park is divided into eight sections. Development and construction of Biyun Green Space began in 2017 by Shanghai Pudong Development (Group) Co., Ltd. The entire project was carried out in eight phases.

== Parks Affiliated with Biyun Green Space ==
=== YuedongPark ===
Yuedong Park is located on the west side of the Pudong Football Stadium. It opened on July 1, 2021.

=== Liandong Park ===
Liandong Park is located on the southwest side of the Shanghai Middle Ring Road. It opened to the public in November 2022.

=== Yingdong Park ===
Yingdong Park is located on the south bank of Zhangjiabang, spanning both sides of the Shanghai Middle Ring Road, with a total area of approximately 230,000 square meters. It opened on September 28, 2023.

=== Yuntianhu Park ===
Yuntian Lake Park is located at the easternmost part of Biyun Green Space, covering an area of approximately 67 hectares. It features Yuntian Lake, which occupies about 27.8 hectares—roughly half of the entire park. The park opened on October 1, 2024.
