= Guanglan Road station =

Shanghai Metro station

Guanglan Road 广兰路
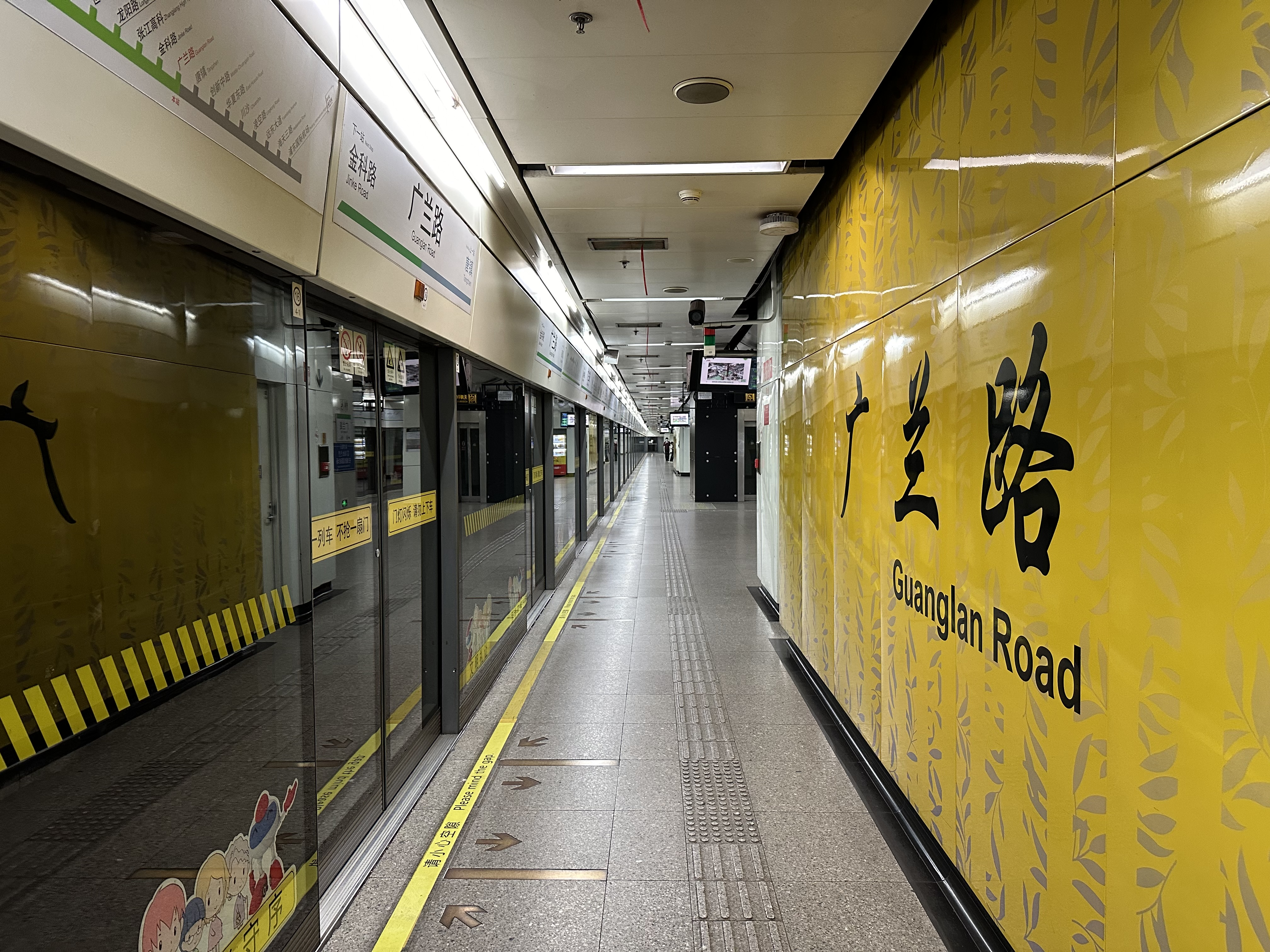
- Station platform

General information
- Location: Pudong, Shanghai; China
- Coordinates: 31°12′40″N 121°37′19″E
- Operator: Shanghai No. 2 Metro Operation Co. Ltd.
- Line: Line 2
- Platforms: 2 (1 island and 1 side platform)
- Tracks: 3

Construction
- Structure type: Underground
- Accessible: Yes

Other information
- Station code: L02/09

History
- Opened: 24 February 2010

Services
Preceding station	Shanghai Metro	Following station
Jinke Road towards Panxiang Road · Shanghai National Accounting Institute	Line 2	Tangzhen towards Pudong Airport Terminal 1&2

Future service
Preceding station	Shanghai Metro	Following station
Longdong Avenue towards Dongjing Road	Line 21	Gaosi Road towards Shanghai East Railway Station
Location
- Location within Shanghai

Guanglan Road (Chinese: 广兰路; pinyin: Guǎnglán Lù) is a station on Line 2 of the Shanghai Metro. The station is located along Zuchongzhi Road and is located between the stations of Tangzhen and the Jinke Road on Line 2. The station is located east of the intersection between Zuchongzhi Road and Guanglan Road, and has four exits. The station was opened on 24 February 2010, after Line 2 was extended from Zhangjiang High Technology Park. Line 21 is planned to serve this station.

== History ==
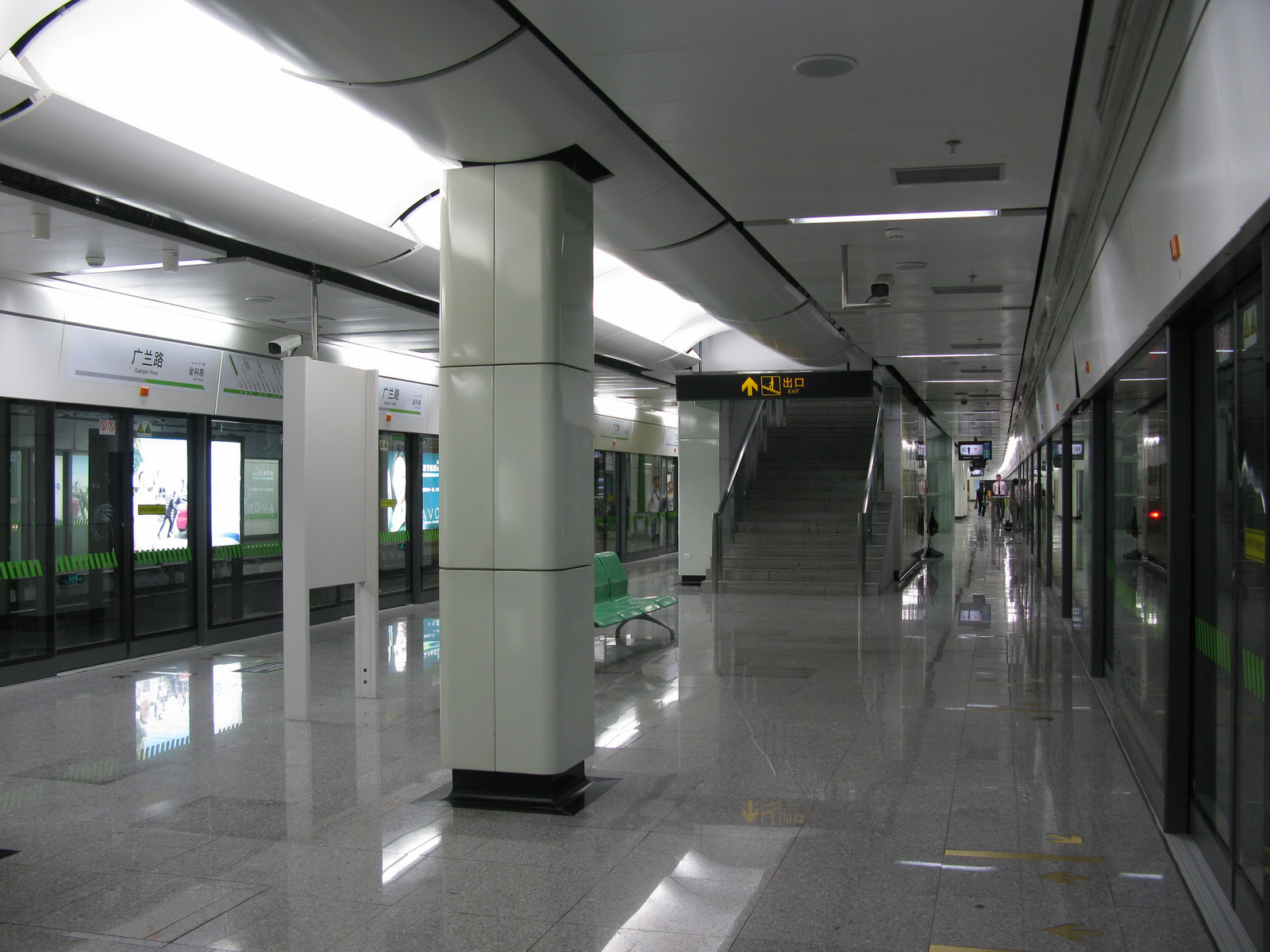
The underground platform of the station in 2010

By 2008, the Line 2 terminated at the Zhangjiang High Technology Park station. On 24 February 2010, the line was expanded from this station through the Jinke Road station to the Guanglan Road station. Two months later, the line was extended past this station through Tangzhen, Middle Chuangxin Road, East Huaxia Road, Chuansha, Lingkong Road, Yuandong Avenue, and Haitiansan Road stations to the Pudong Airport Terminal 1&2 station, which serves the Shanghai Pudong International Airport.

== Facilities ==
The station is located in Shanghai's Pudong New Area, along Zuchongzhi Road, near an intersection with Guanglan Road and Shenjiang Road.

=== Exits ===
Shaped like an oblong rectangle, the station has 4 exits, 1-5 (There is no Exit 3)

- Exits 1 and 5 are located north of Zuchongzhi Road, with exit 1 further to the east than exit 5.
- Exits 2 and 4 are located south of the road, with exit 4 further to the west than exit 2. Exit 4 is located south of the Pudongxingqu Zhangjiangzhen Zhongxin Elementary School, which occupies the area above the western section of the station. The eastern section of the station is located beneath a Shanghai Tianxiang Garment Manufacturing Ltd. Co. building. The station is served by bus routes 615, 636, and 990.

== Service ==
Along Line 2, the station is located between the Jinke Road station and the Tangzhen station. It takes approximately 60 minutes to ride the train to Panxiang Road · Shanghai National Accounting Institute, the west end of the line, and 34 minutes to Pudong Airport Terminal 1&2, the eastern terminus. The train operates from 5:30 to 22:45 westbound and from 6:30 to 21:00 eastbound. On weekdays, trains leave the station approximately every 3 minutes and 30 seconds during peak hours and every four to ten minutes during non-peak hours. Peak hours are defined as from 7:30 to 9:30 and 17:00 to 19:00 on Monday through Thursday, as well as 7:00 to 9:00 and 12:50 to 20:30 on Friday. On weekends, trains leave the stations every 4 minutes and 5 seconds from 8:00 to 20:30, and every five to ten minutes during other times. Before 2019, the station was a transfer station for passengers traveling to or from points east on Line 2. Originally, Line 2 used 4-carriage trains heading east of Guanglan Road while 8-carriage trains were used heading west. In April 2019, short-running on the eastern portion of the line became rush hour only and mainline services were extended to Pudong Airport with 8-carriage trains.

== Future ==
Line 21 will stop at this station when constructions are expected to finish at 2027.

== Station Layout ==
G	Entrances and Exits	Exits 1-2, 4-5
B1	Concourse	Faregates, Station Agent
B2	Westbound	← Line 2 towards National Exhibition and Convention Center (Jinke Road)
B2	Island platform
B2	Westbound	← Line 2 towards National Exhibition and Convention Center (Jinke Road)
B2	Eastbound	Line 2 towards Pudong Airport Terminal 1&2 (Tangzhen) →
B2	Side Platform, doors open on the right
