= Middle Chuangxin Road station =

Shanghai Metro station

Middle Chuangxin Road 创新中路
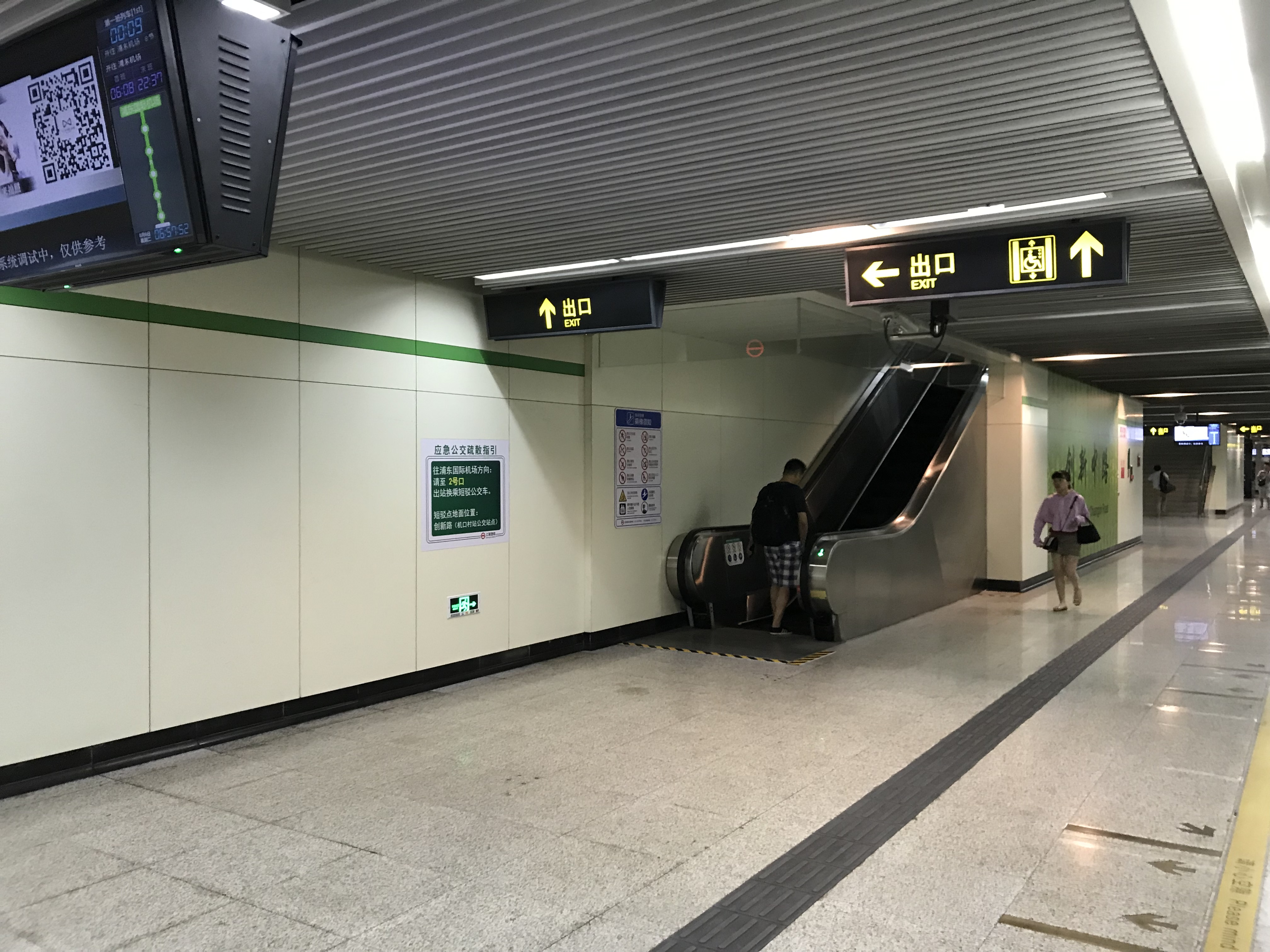

General information
- Location: Tangzhen, Pudong, Shanghai; China
- Coordinates: 31°12′50″N 121°40′25″E
- Operator: Shanghai No. 2 Metro Operation Co. Ltd.
- Line: Line 2
- Platforms: 2 (2 side platforms)
- Tracks: 2

Construction
- Structure type: Underground
- Accessible: Yes

Other information
- Station code: L02/07

History
- Opened: 8 April 2010

Services
Preceding station	Shanghai Metro	Following station
Tangzhen towards Panxiang Road · Shanghai National Accounting Institute	Line 2	East Huaxia Road towards Pudong Airport Terminal 1&2
Location
- Location within Shanghai

Middle Chuangxin Road (Chinese: 创新中路; pinyin: Chuàngxīn Zhōng Lù) is a station on Line 2 of the Shanghai Metro, located in Tangzhen, Pudong. This station is part of the eastward extension from Guanglan Road to Pudong International Airport that opened on 8 April 2010.

The station was formerly known as East Tangzhen (Chinese: 唐镇东; pinyin: Tángzhèn Dōng)
