= Yuandong Avenue station =

Shanghai Metro station

Yuandong Avenue 远东大道
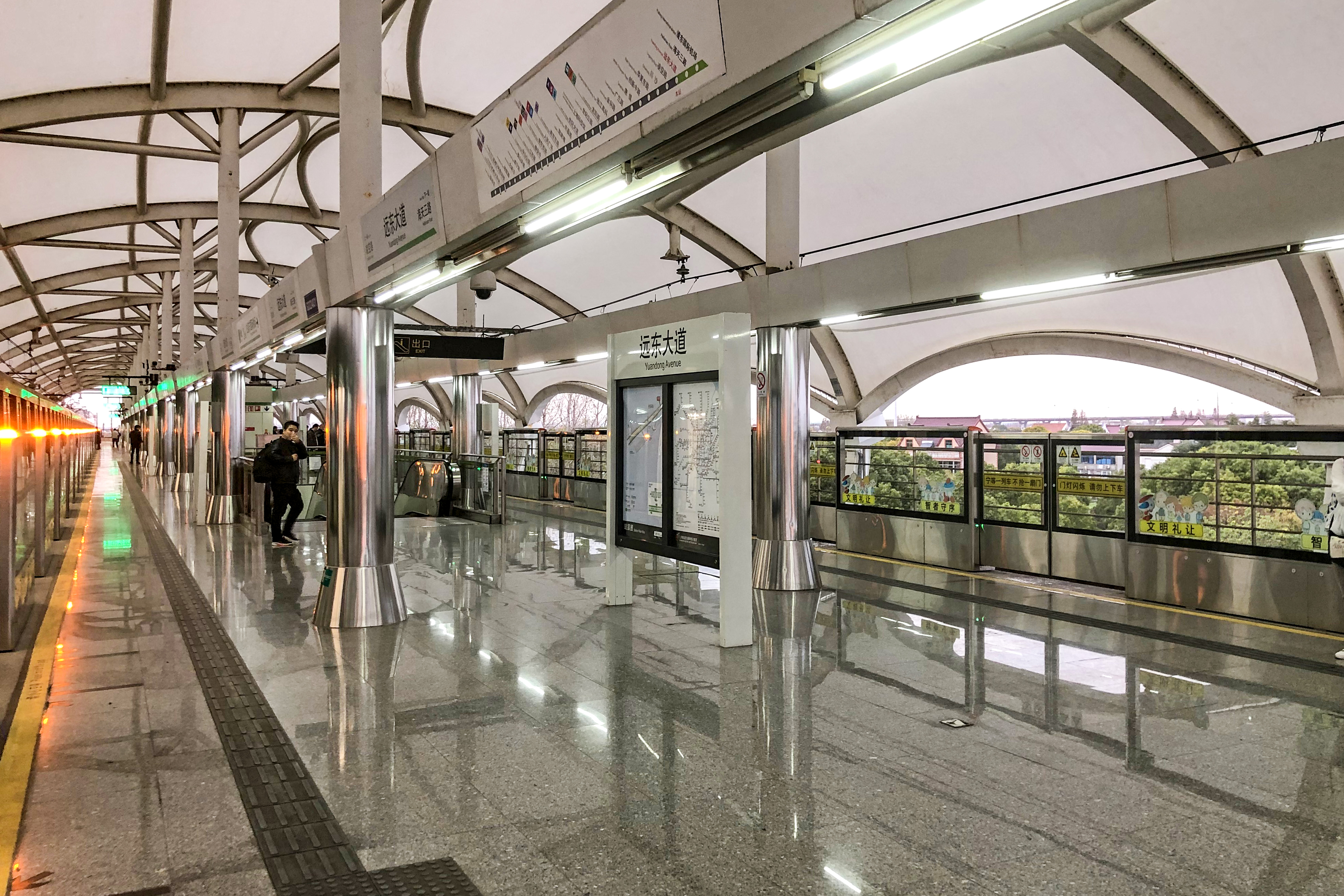
- Station platform

General information
- Location: Huazhou Road (华洲路) and G1503 Shanghai Ring Expressway (上海绕城高速公路); Zhuqiao, Pudong, Shanghai; China
- Coordinates: 31°12′05″N 121°45′09″E
- Operator: Shanghai No. 2 Metro Operation Co. Ltd.
- Line: Line 2
- Platforms: 2 (1 island platform)
- Tracks: 2

Construction
- Structure type: Elevated
- Accessible: Yes

Other information
- Station code: L02/03

History
- Opened: 8 April 2010

Services
Preceding station	Shanghai Metro	Following station
Lingkong Road towards Panxiang Road · Shanghai National Accounting Institute	Line 2	Haitiansan Road towards Pudong Airport Terminal 1&2
Location
- Location within Shanghai

Yuandong Avenue (Chinese: 远东大道) is a station on Line 2 of the Shanghai Metro, located in the town of Zhuqiao, Pudong. This station is part of the eastward extension from Guanglan Road to Pudong International Airport that opened on 8 April 2010.
