= Tangzhen station =

Shanghai Metro station

Tangzhen 唐镇
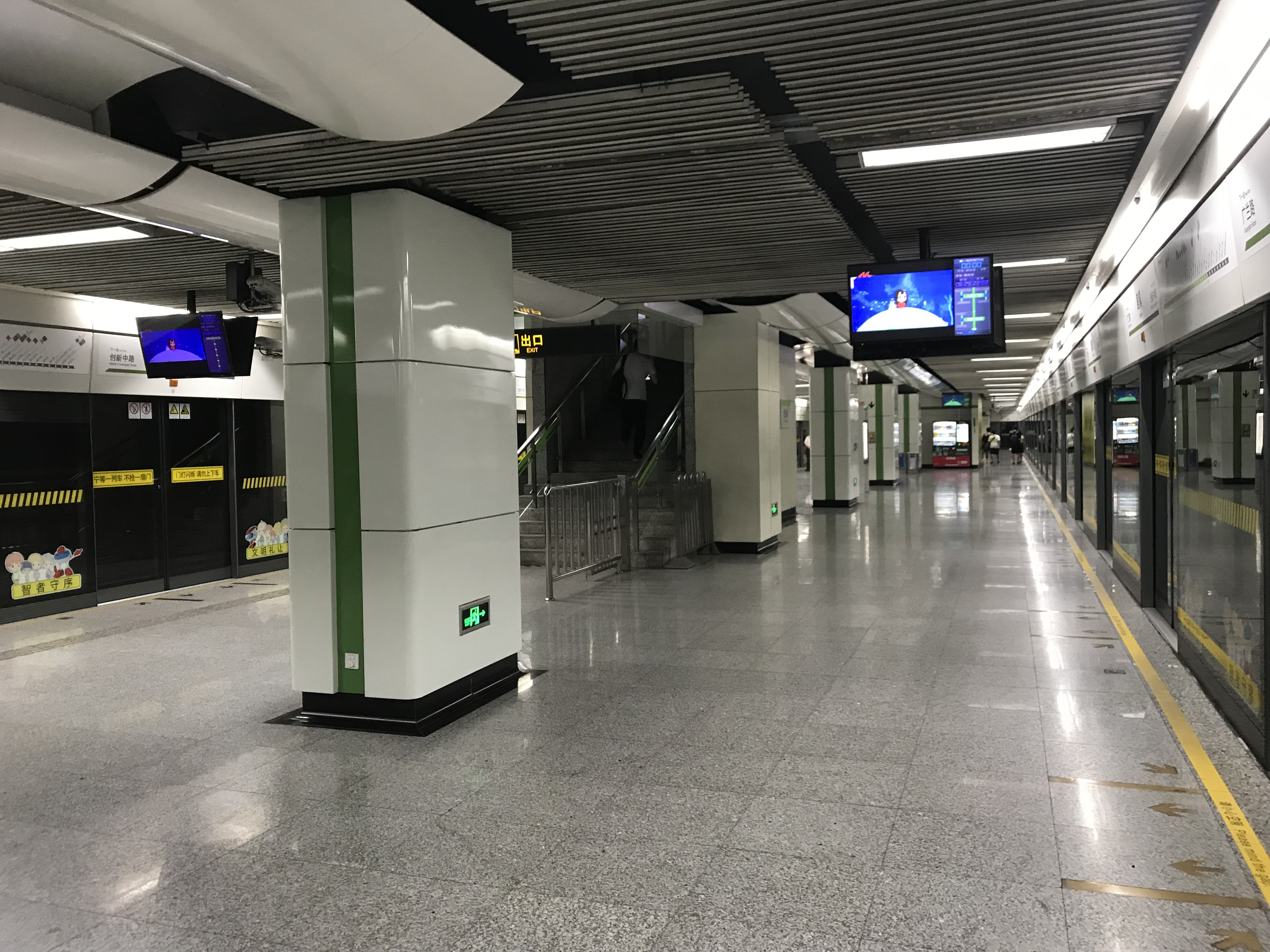
- Station platform

General information
- Location: East Gaoke Road (高科东路) and Qi'ai Road (齐爱路); Tangzhen, Pudong, Shanghai; China
- Coordinates: 31°07′33″N 121°23′53″E
- Operator: Shanghai No. 2 Metro Operation Co. Ltd.
- Line: Line 2
- Platforms: 2 (1 island platform)
- Tracks: 2

Construction
- Structure type: Underground
- Accessible: Yes

Other information
- Station code: L02/08

History
- Opened: 8 April 2010

Services
Preceding station	Shanghai Metro	Following station
Guanglan Road towards Panxiang Road · Shanghai National Accounting Institute	Line 2	Middle Chuangxin Road towards Pudong Airport Terminal 1&2
Location
- Location within Shanghai

Tangzhen (Chinese: 唐镇) is a station on Line 2 of the Shanghai Metro, located in the town of Tangzhen, Pudong. This station is part of the eastward extension from Guanglan Road to Pudong International Airport that opened on 8 April 2010.
