= Haitiansan Road station =

Shanghai Metro station

Haitiansan Road 海天三路
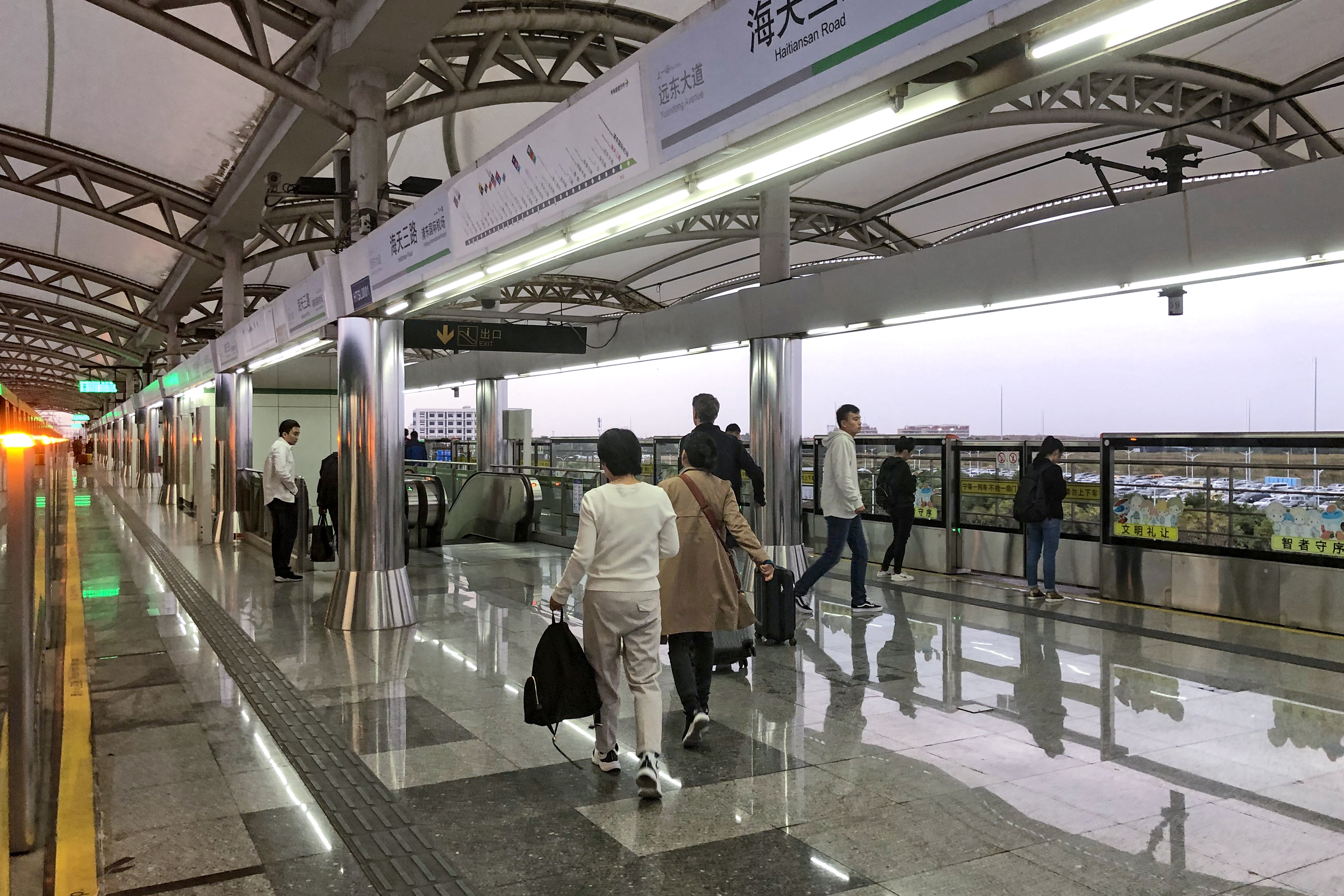
- Station platform

General information
- Location: S1 Yingbin Expressway (上海迎宾高速公路) and Haitiansan Road (海天三路); Zhuqiao, Pudong, Shanghai; China
- Coordinates: 31°10′13″N 121°47′33″E
- Operator: Shanghai No. 2 Metro Operation Co. Ltd.
- Line: Line 2
- Platforms: 2 (1 island platform)
- Tracks: 2

Construction
- Structure type: Elevated
- Accessible: Yes

Other information
- Station code: L02/02

History
- Opened: 8 April 2010

Services
Preceding station	Shanghai Metro	Following station
Yuandong Avenue towards Panxiang Road · Shanghai National Accounting Institute	Line 2	Pudong Airport Terminal 1&2 Terminus
Location
- Location within Shanghai

Haitiansan Road (Chinese: 海天三路) is a station on Line 2 of the Shanghai Metro, located in the town of Zhuqiao, Pudong. This station is part of the eastward extension from Guanglan Road to Pudong International Airport that opened on 8 April 2010.

The station has the highest risk of flooding among all the Shanghai metro stations.

== Sources ==
- He, Renfei; Zhang, Limao; Tiong, Robert L.K. (2023). "Flood risk assessment and mitigation for metro stations: An evidential-reasoning-based optimality approach considering uncertainty of subjective parameters". Reliability Engineering & System Safety. 238. Elsevier BV. doi:10.1016/j.ress.2023.109453. ISSN 0951-8320.
