= Pudong Airport Terminal 1&2 station =

Shanghai Metro interchange station

Pudong Airport Terminal 1&2 浦东1号2号航站楼站
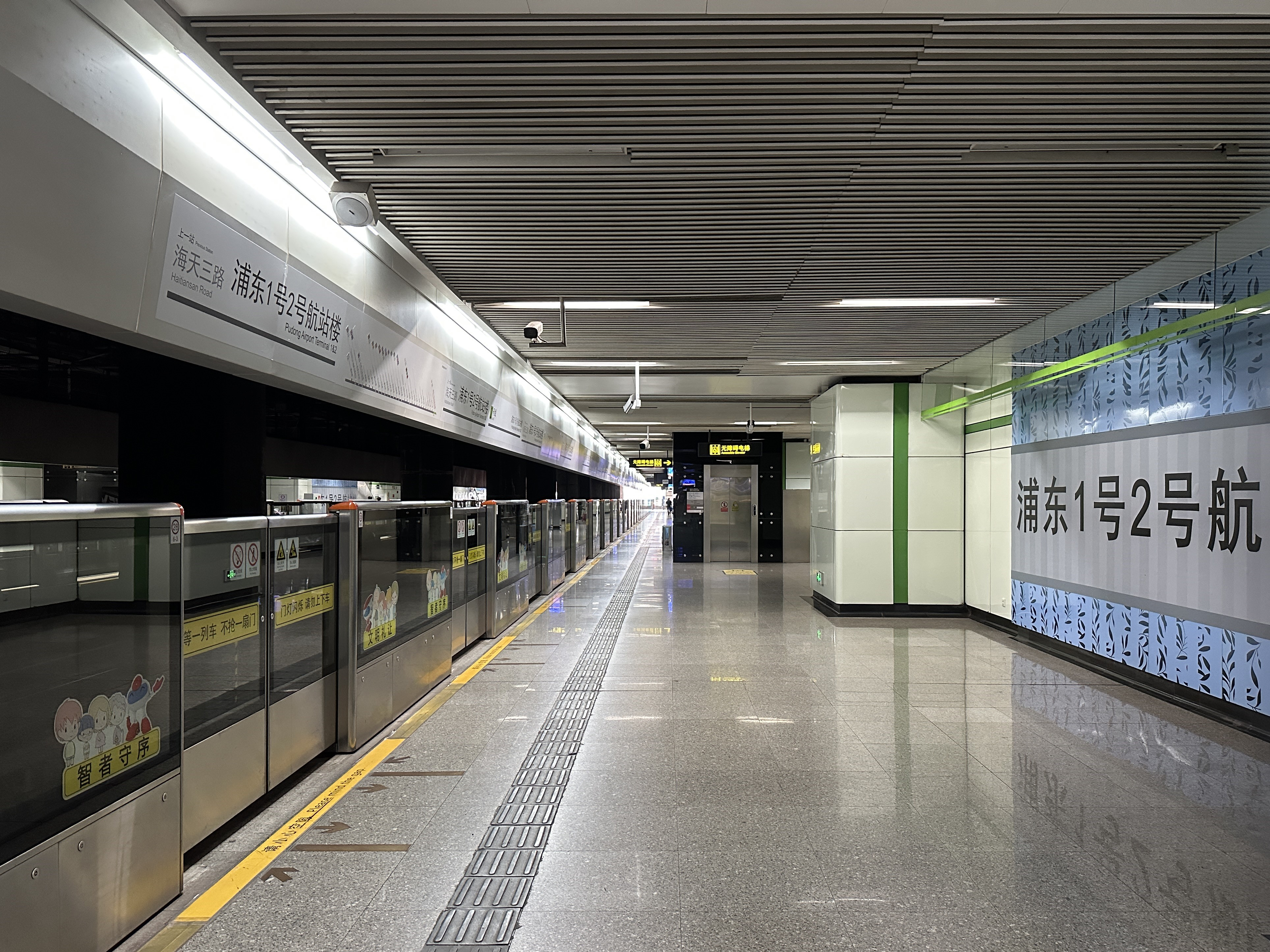
- Line 2 platform

General information
- Other names: Pudong International Airport (浦东国际机场) (before 21 September 2024)
- Location: Pudong Airport, Pudong, Shanghai; China
- Coordinates: 31°08′59″N 121°48′23″E
- Operator: Shanghai No. 2 Metro Operation Co. Ltd.; Shanghai Maglev Transportation Development Co., Ltd.; Shanghai Suburban Railway
- Lines: Line 2; Shanghai maglev train; Airport Link Line
- Platforms: 6 (2 side platforms for Line 2, Maglev and Airport Link Line respectively)
- Tracks: 6
- Connections: PVG People Mover; Pudong International Airport (PVG)

Construction
- Structure type: At-grade (Line 2 & Maglev); Underground (Airport Link Line)
- Accessible: Yes

Other information
- Station code: L02/01(Line 2)

History
- Opened: 31 December 2002; 23 years ago (Maglev); 8 April 2010; 16 years ago (Line 2); 27 December 2024; 19 months ago (Airport Link Line)

Services
Preceding station	Shanghai Metro	Following station
Haitiansan Road towards Panxiang Road · Shanghai National Accounting Institute	Line 2	Terminus
Longyang Road Terminus	Shanghai maglev train	Terminus
Preceding station	Shanghai Suburban Railway	Following station
Shanghai International Resort towards Hongqiao Airport Terminal 2	Airport Link Line	Terminus
Location
- Location within Shanghai

Pudong Airport Terminal 1&2 (Note: Chinese: 浦东1号2号航站楼; pinyin: Pǔdōng Yīhàoèrhào Hángzhànlóu); Formerly Pudong International Airport (Chinese: 浦东国际机场; pinyin: Pǔdōng Guójìjīchǎng)) is a railway, metro and maglev station located within Shanghai Pudong International Airport in Shanghai. It serves as both the eastern terminus of both the Shanghai maglev train, having opened to trial operations on 31 December 2002, and, since an eastern extension from Guanglan Road opened on 8 April 2010, the eastern terminus of Line 2 of the Shanghai Metro. Although the metro and maglev stations are in the same property, they have distinct fare-paid zones, as their fare systems are separate.

It is the current eastern terminus of the Airport Link line. To match the station of Airport link line, the station was renamed on 21 September 2024.

== Station Layout ==
2F	Line 2 Concourse	Faregates, Station Agent
2F	Shanghai maglev train Concourse	Faregates, Station Agent
1F	Side platform, doors open on the right
1F	Westbound	← Line 2 towards National Exhibition and Convention Center (Haitiansan Road)
1F	Eastbound	Line 2 termination track →
1F	Side platform, doors open on the right
1F	Side platform, doors open on the left
1F	Westbound	← Shanghai maglev train towards Longyang Road (Terminus)
1F	Westbound	← Shanghai maglev train towards Longyang Road (Terminus)
1F	Side platform, doors open on the right

== Gallery ==
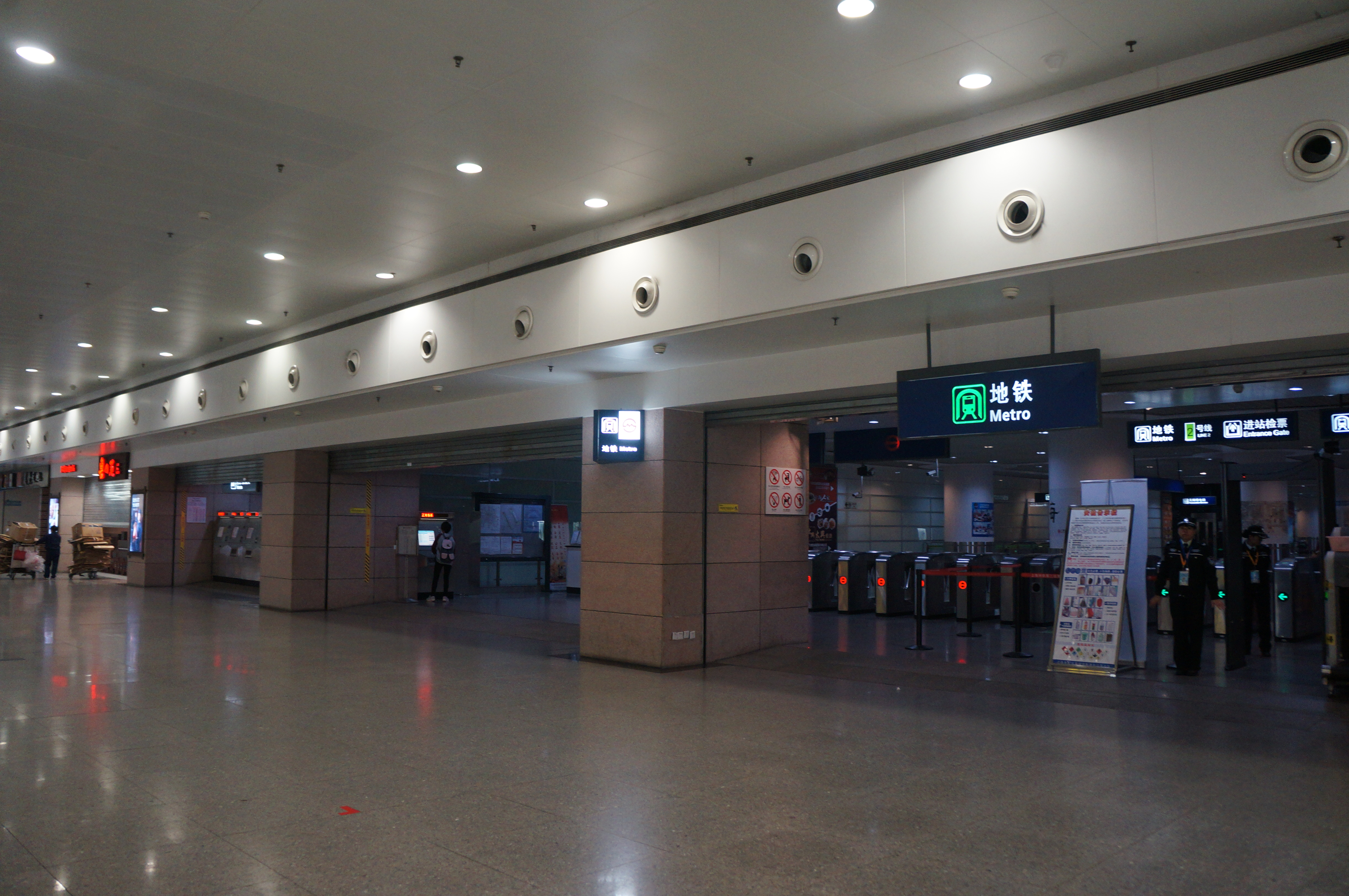
Station entrance

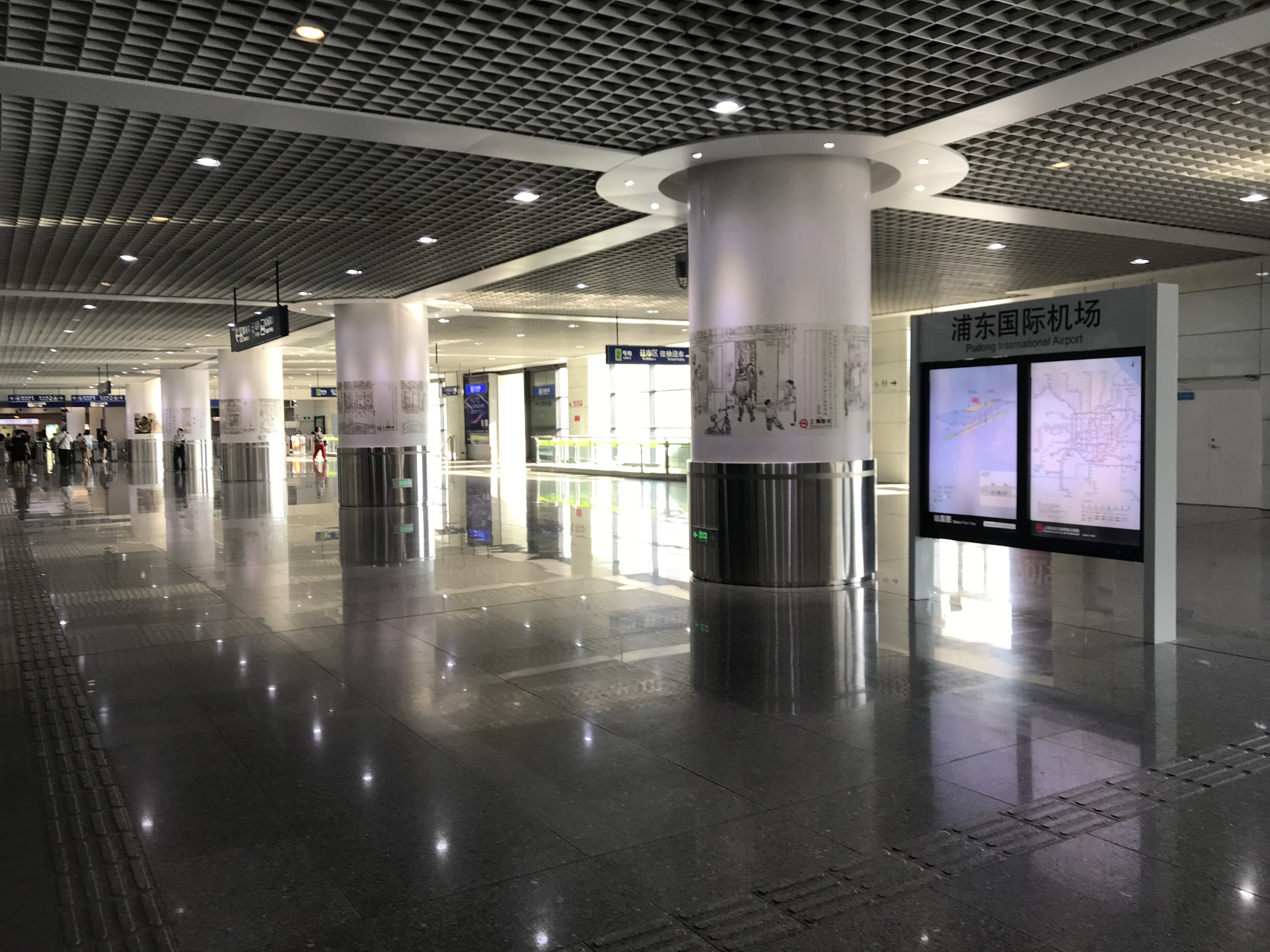
Concourse

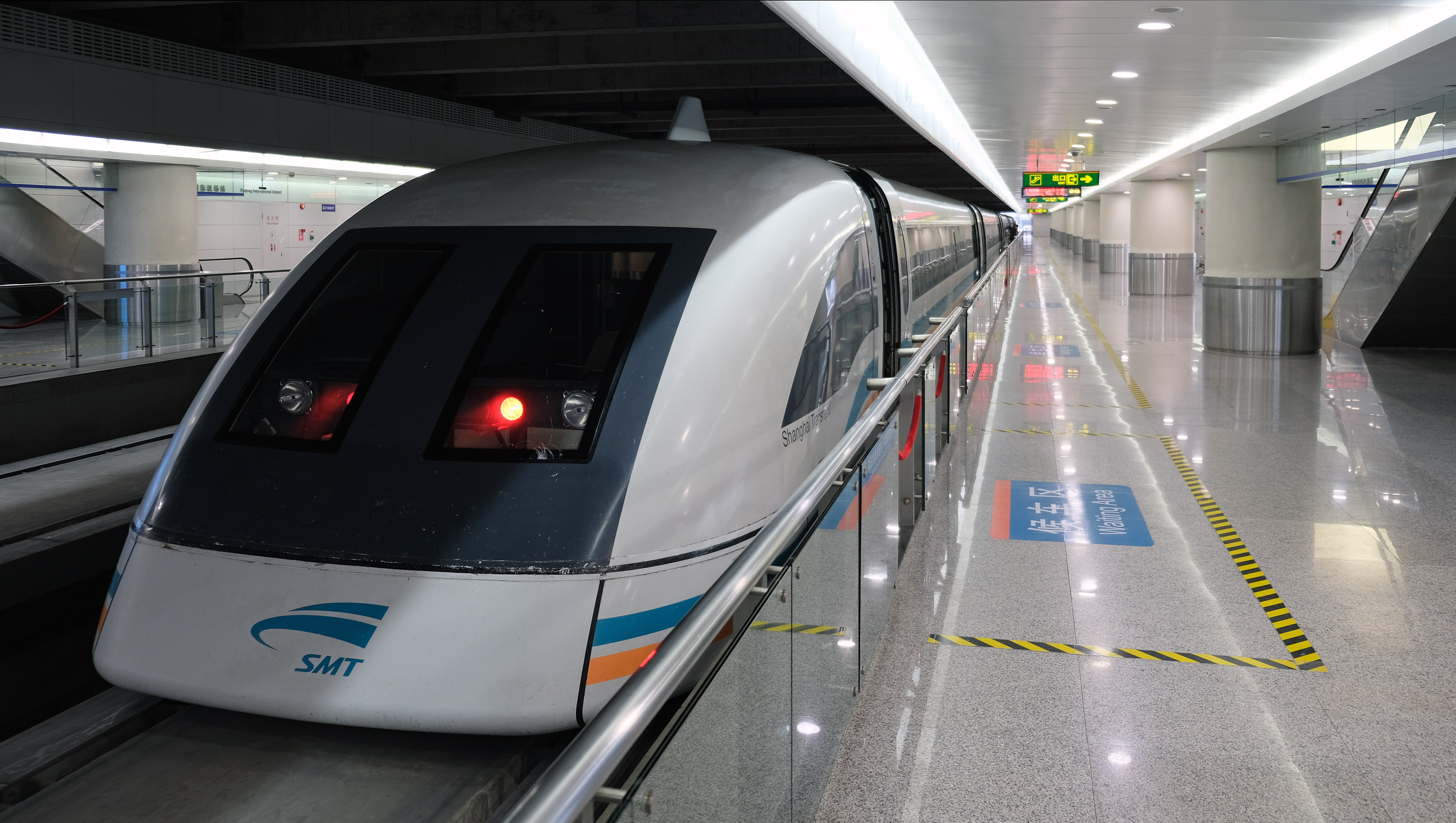
Platform for Shanghai maglev train

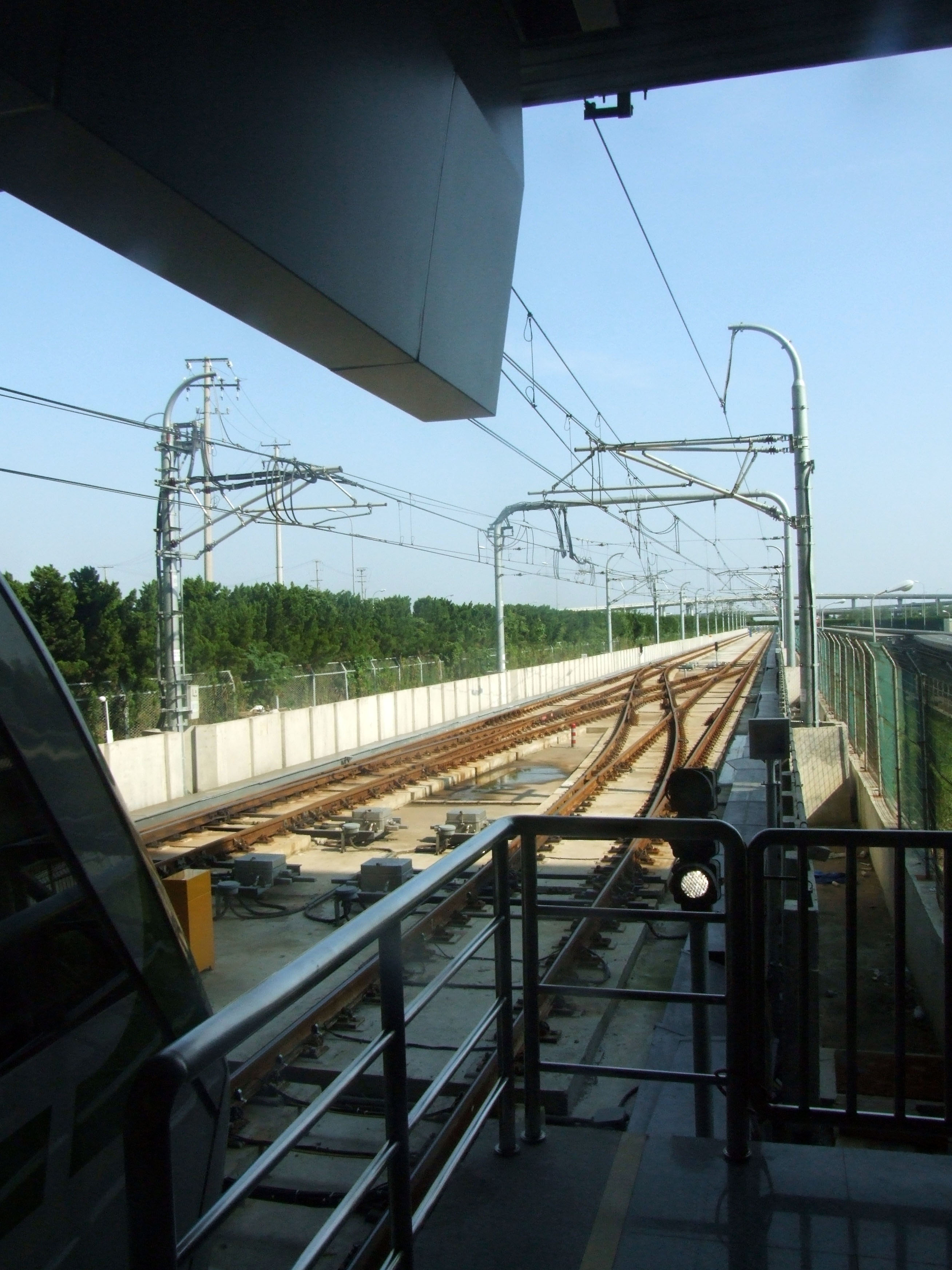
Tail track of Line 2, which terminates at Pudong International Airport station
