= Panxiang Road · Shanghai National Accounting Institute station =

Shanghai Metro Line 2 terminus station

Panxiang Road · Shanghai National Accounting Institute 蟠祥路·国家会计学院
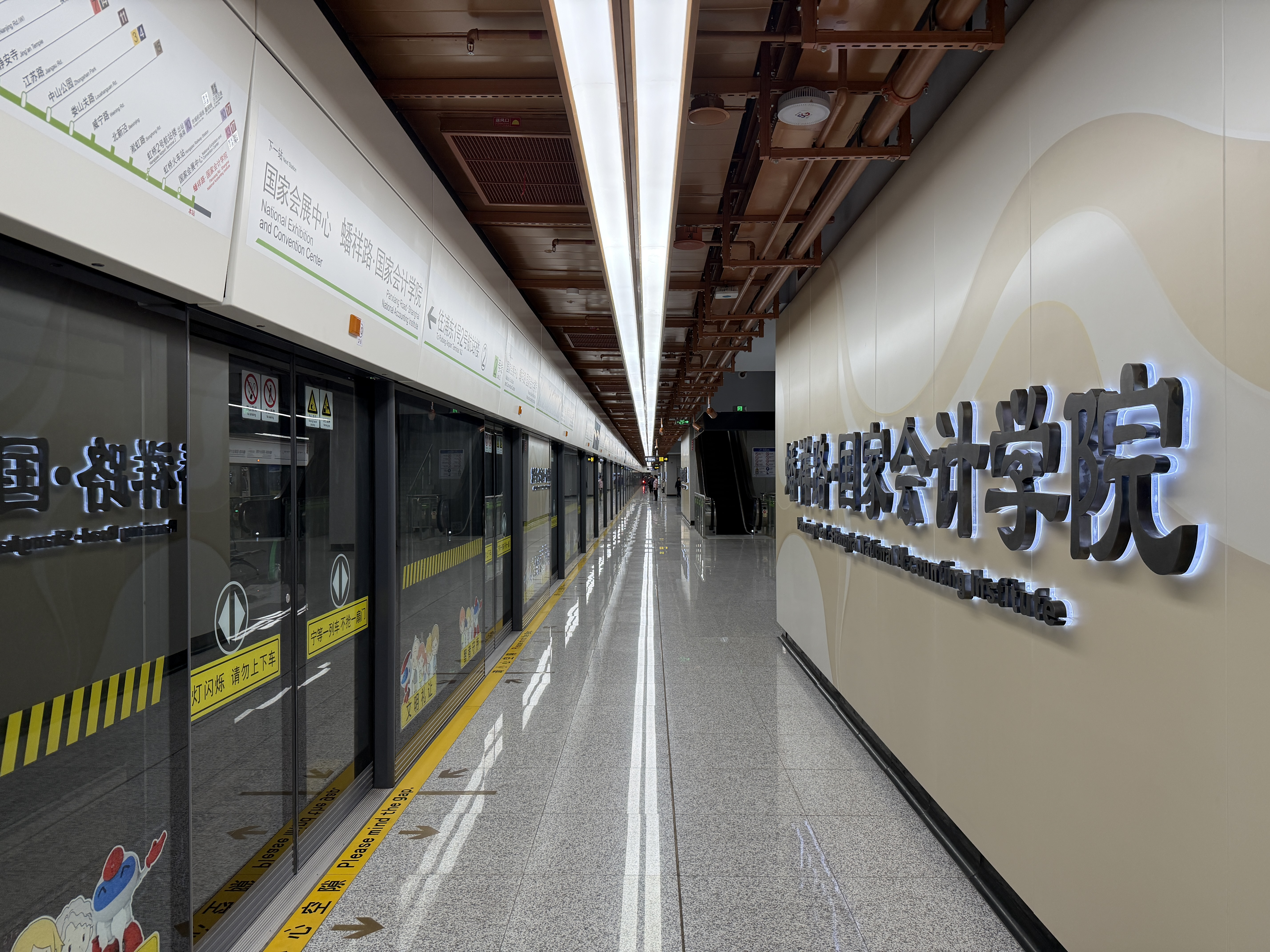
- Platform

Chinese name
- Simplified Chinese: 蟠祥路·国家会计学院
- Traditional Chinese: 蟠祥路·國家會計學院
Transcriptions
Standard Mandarin
- Hanyu Pinyin: Pánxiáng Lù Guójiā Kuàijì Xuéyuàn

General information
- Location: Intersection of Panlong Road (蟠龙路) and Xumin Road (徐民路); Xujing, Qingpu District, Shanghai; China
- Coordinates: 31°10′57″N 121°16′49″E
- Operator: Shanghai No. 2 Metro Operation Co. Ltd.
- Line: Line 2
- Platforms: 2 (1 island platform)
- Tracks: 2

Construction
- Structure type: Underground
- Accessible: Yes

History
- Opened: 1 November 2025; 9 months ago

Services
Preceding station	Shanghai Metro	Following station
Terminus	Line 2	National Exhibition and Convention Center towards Pudong Airport Terminal 1&2
Location
- Location within Shanghai

Panxiang Road · Shanghai National Accounting Institute (Chinese: 蟠祥路·国家会计学院; pinyin: Pánxiáng Lù Guójiā Kuàijì Xuéyuàn), formerly known as Panxiang Road, is a metro station on Line 2 of the Shanghai Metro in Shanghai, China, located on Xumin Road and Panxiang Road. It is the western terminus of Line 2. It is named after Panxiang Road (Chinese: 蟠祥路; pinyin: Pánxiáng Lù) and Shanghai National Accounting Institute (Chinese: 上海国家会计学院; pinyin: Shànghǎi Guójiā Kuàijì Xuéyuàn).

The station opened on 1 November 2025. It is 1.67 km away from the old terminus, National Exhibition and Convention Center station.

== Name designation ==
The Shanghai Municipal Government completed the station naming work for the west extension of Line 2 and other projects in 2024, and the station was named Panxiang Road station. The metro company updated the network-wide guide in September 2024, using the station name on the line map. In 2025, the interior and exterior of the station was intended to be decorated according to the name of "Panxiang Road station".

The Shanghai National Accounting Institute is a public institution directly under the Ministry of Finance of the People's Republic of China, and its distance to this station is nearly 600 meters. After September 2025, the station was suddenly renamed Panxiang Road · Shanghai National Accounting Institute station, being one of only three station names with the separator "·" and having the longest Chinese name of any station on the Shanghai Metro network. The other two stations are Site of the First CPC National Congress · South Huangpi Road and Site of the First CPC National Congress · Xintiandi.

== Structure ==
The station has an underground island platform. There are 5 entrance/exit gates.

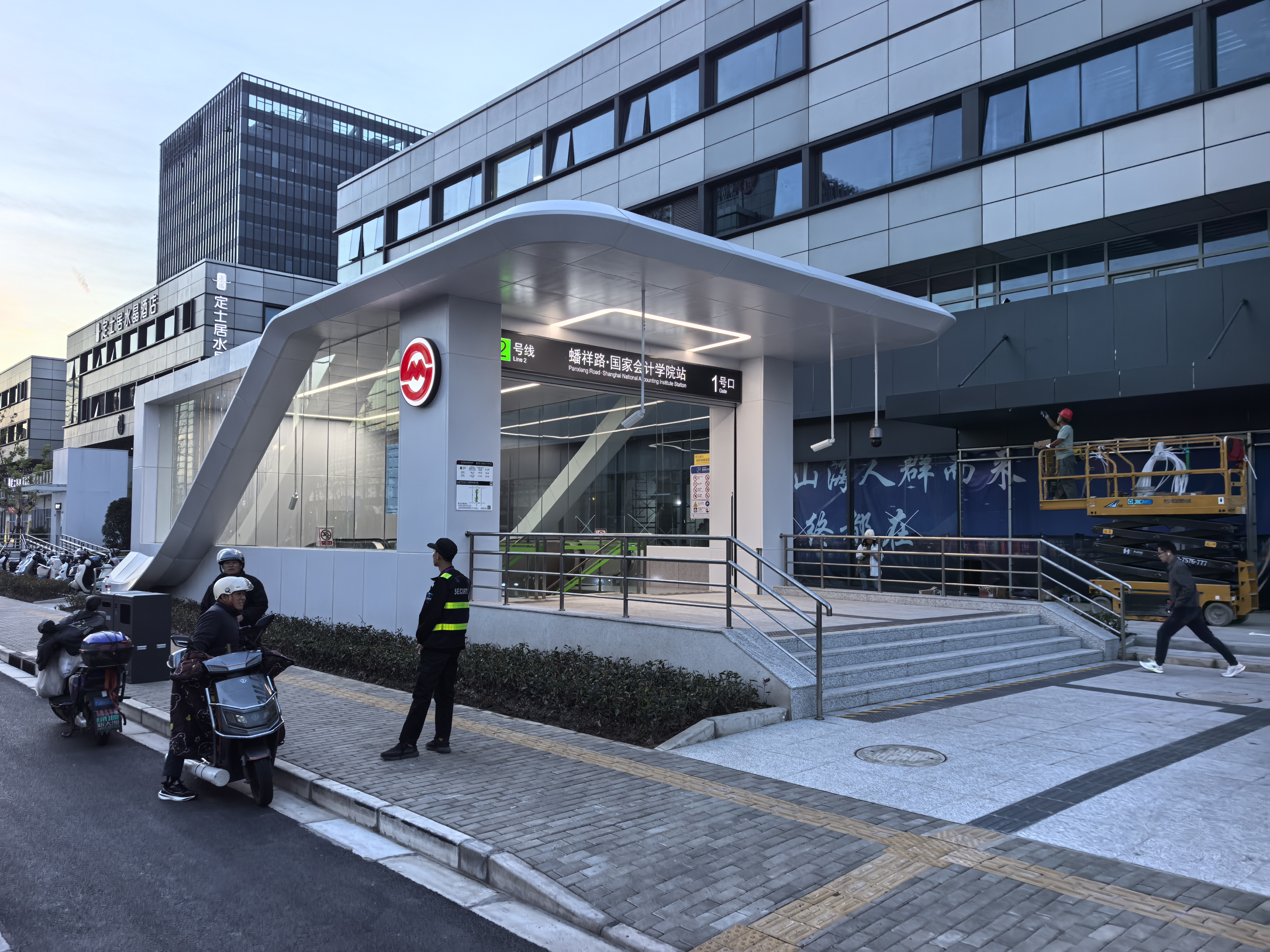
Gate 1

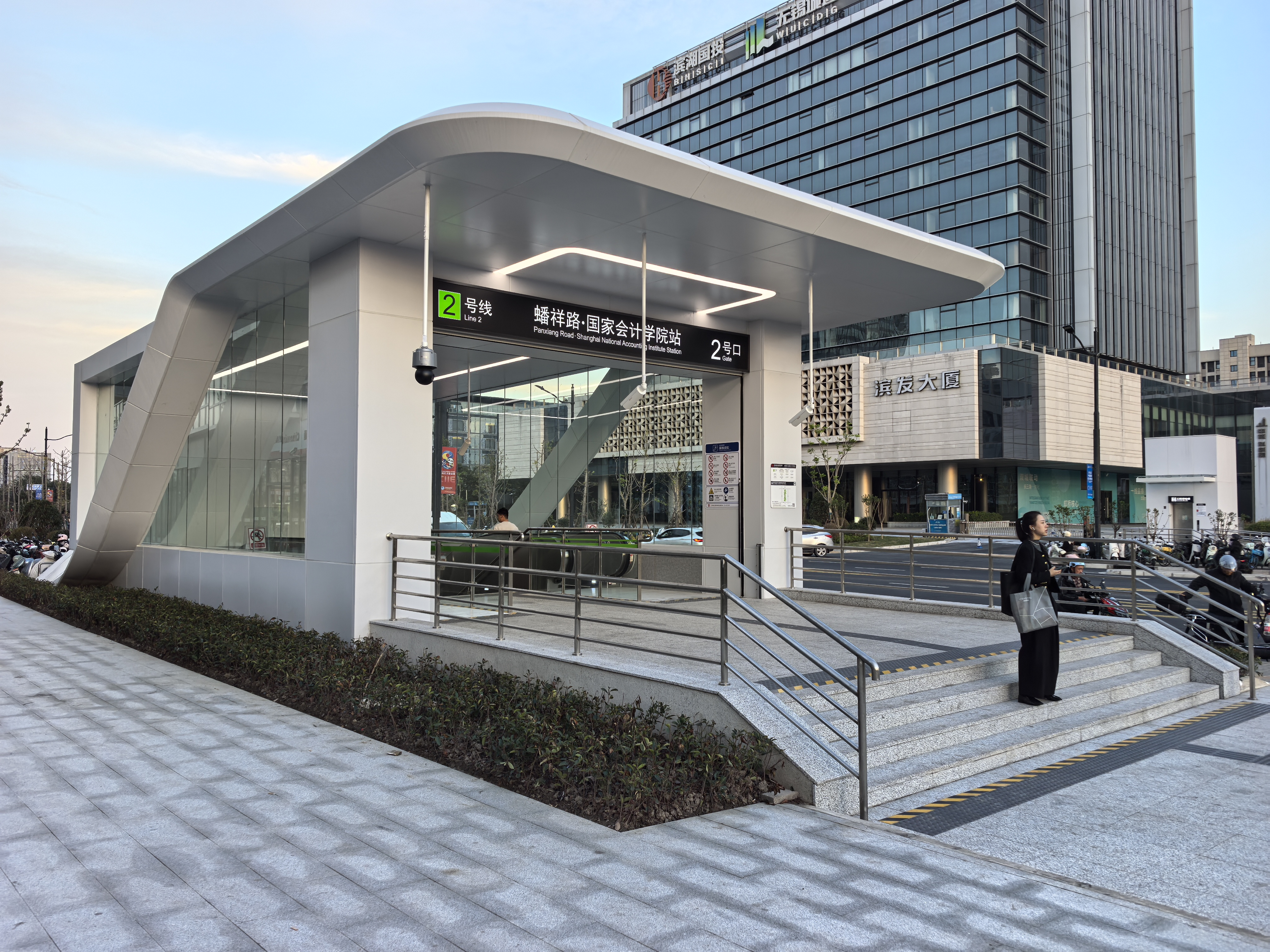
Gate 2

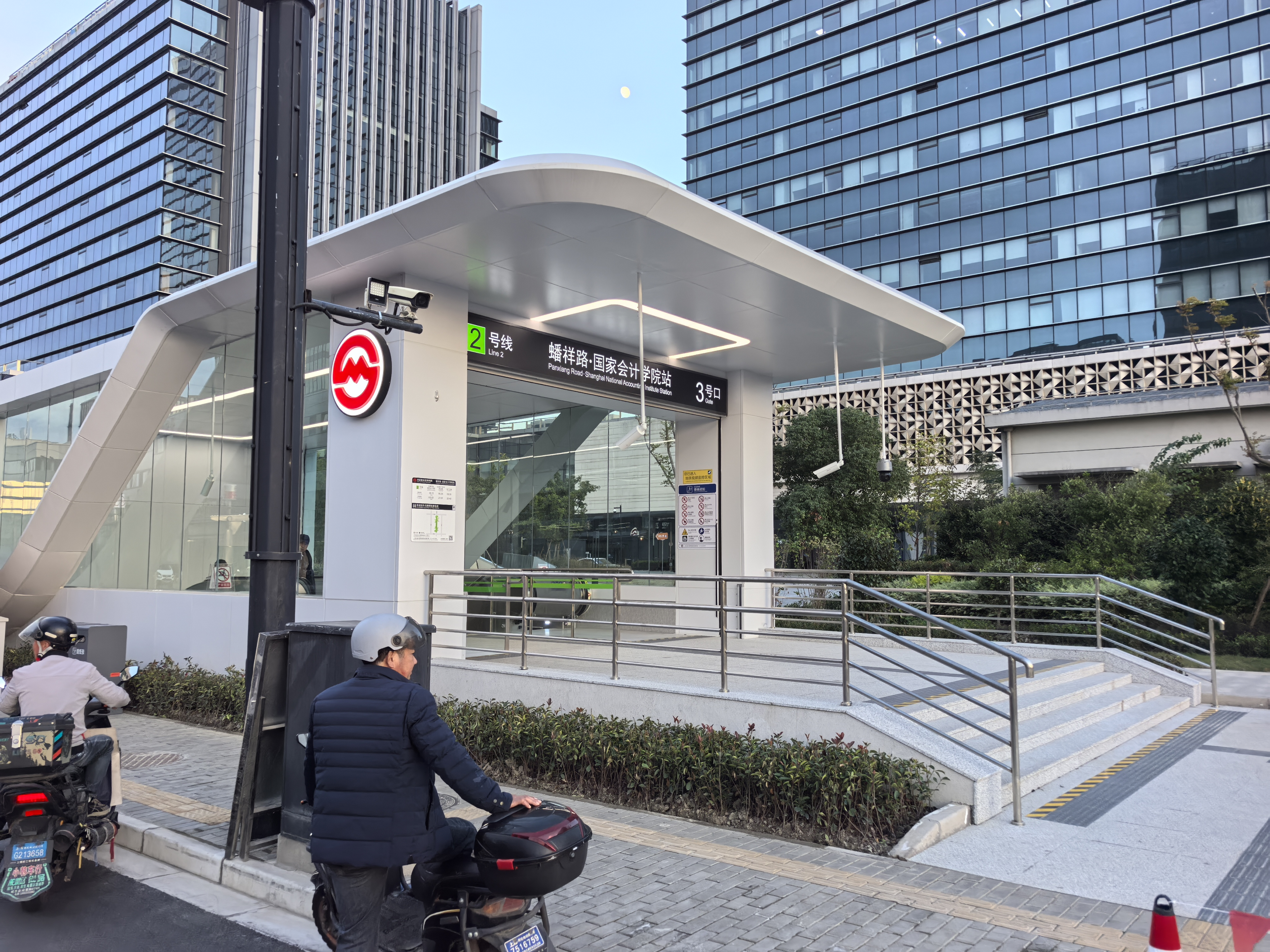
Gate 3

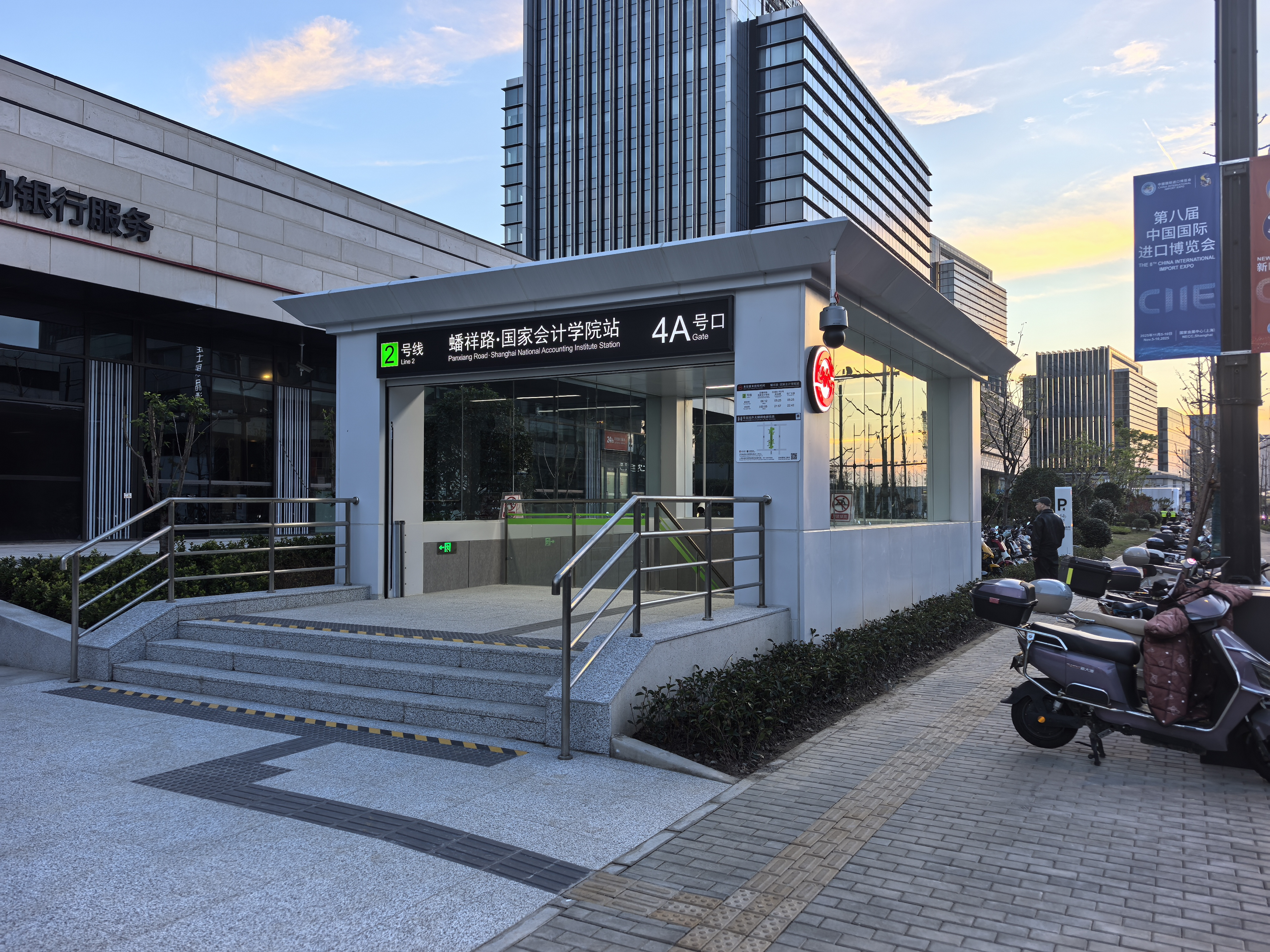
Gate 4A

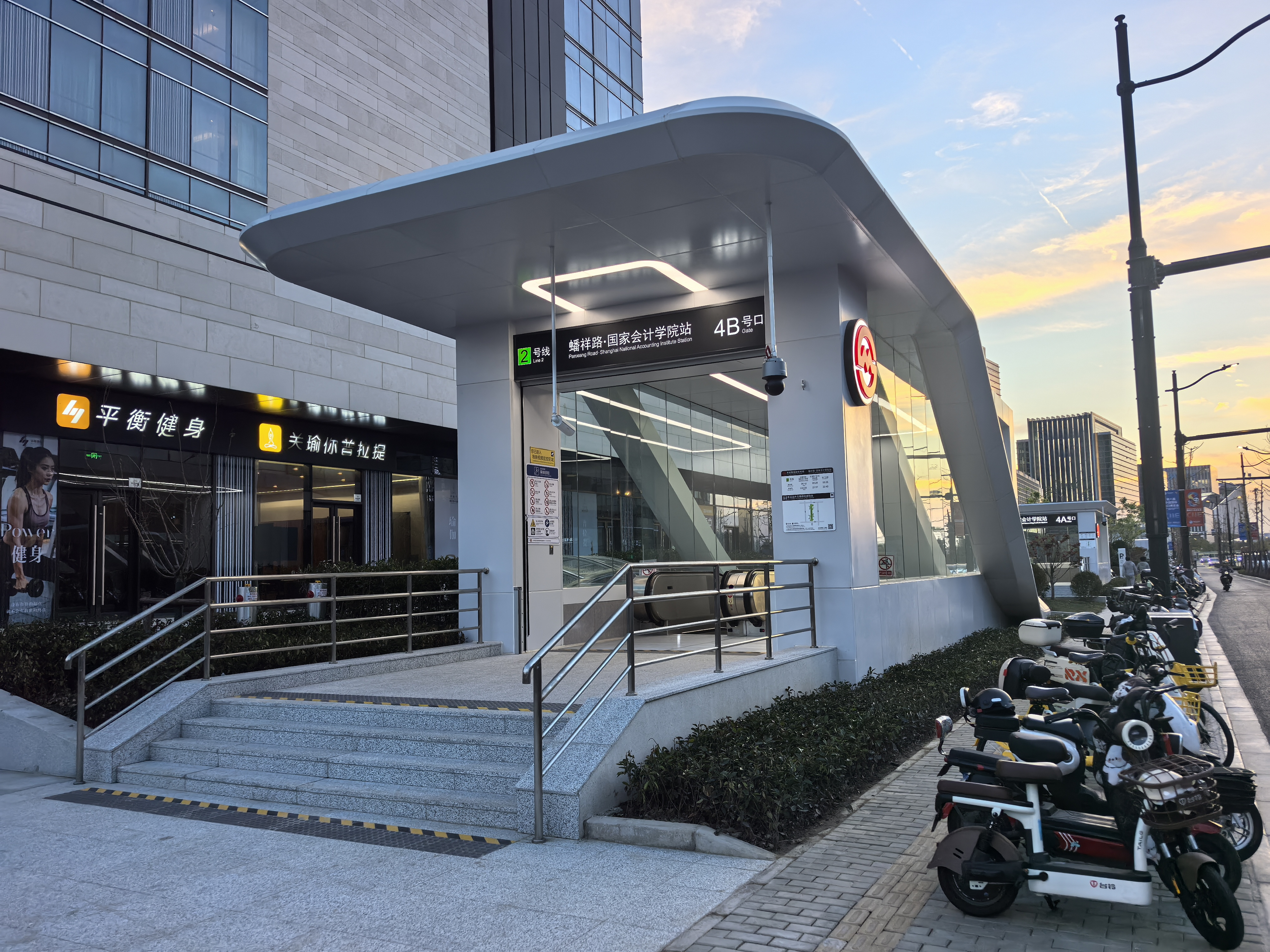
Gate 4B

== Gallery ==
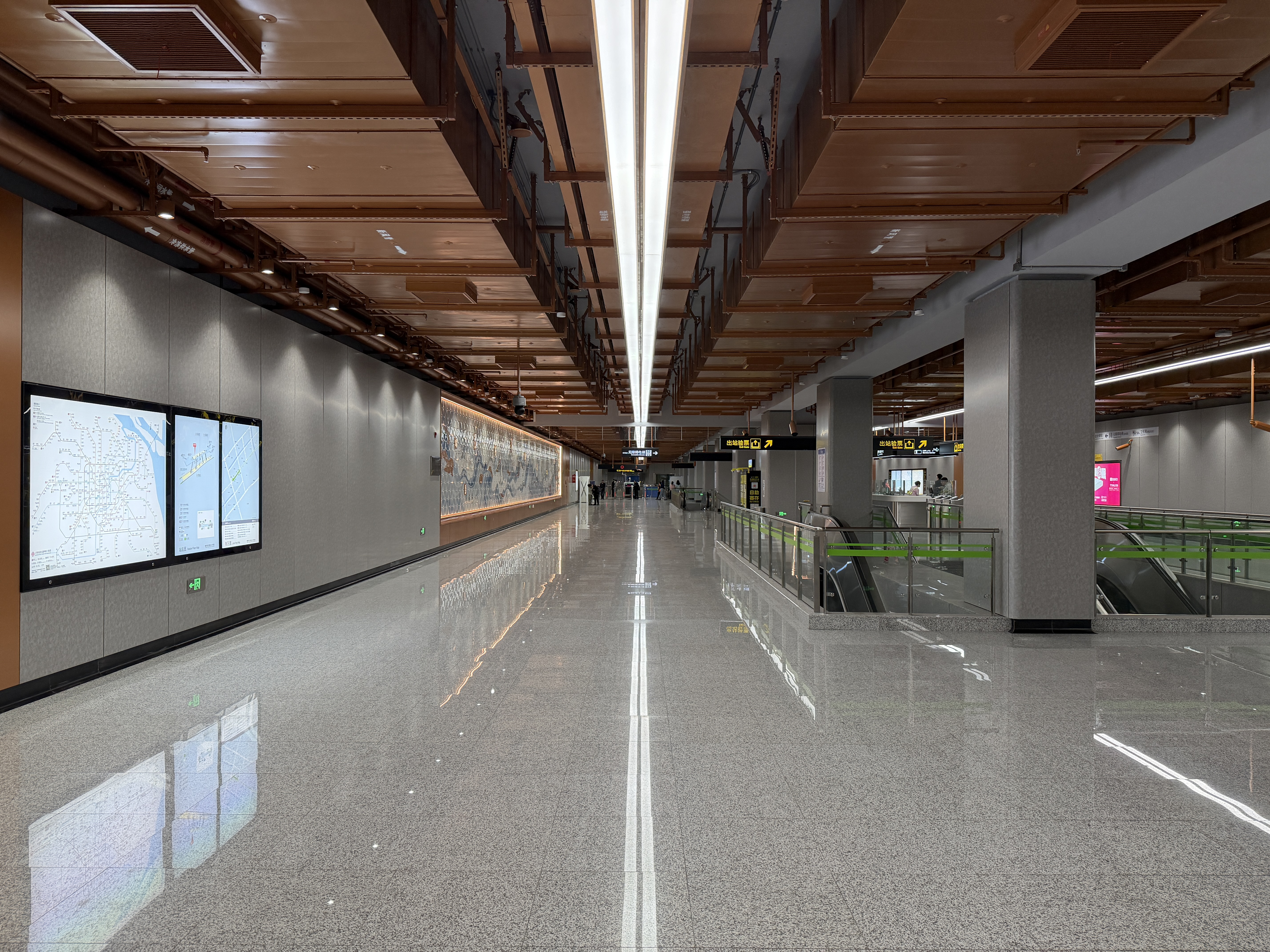
Concourse

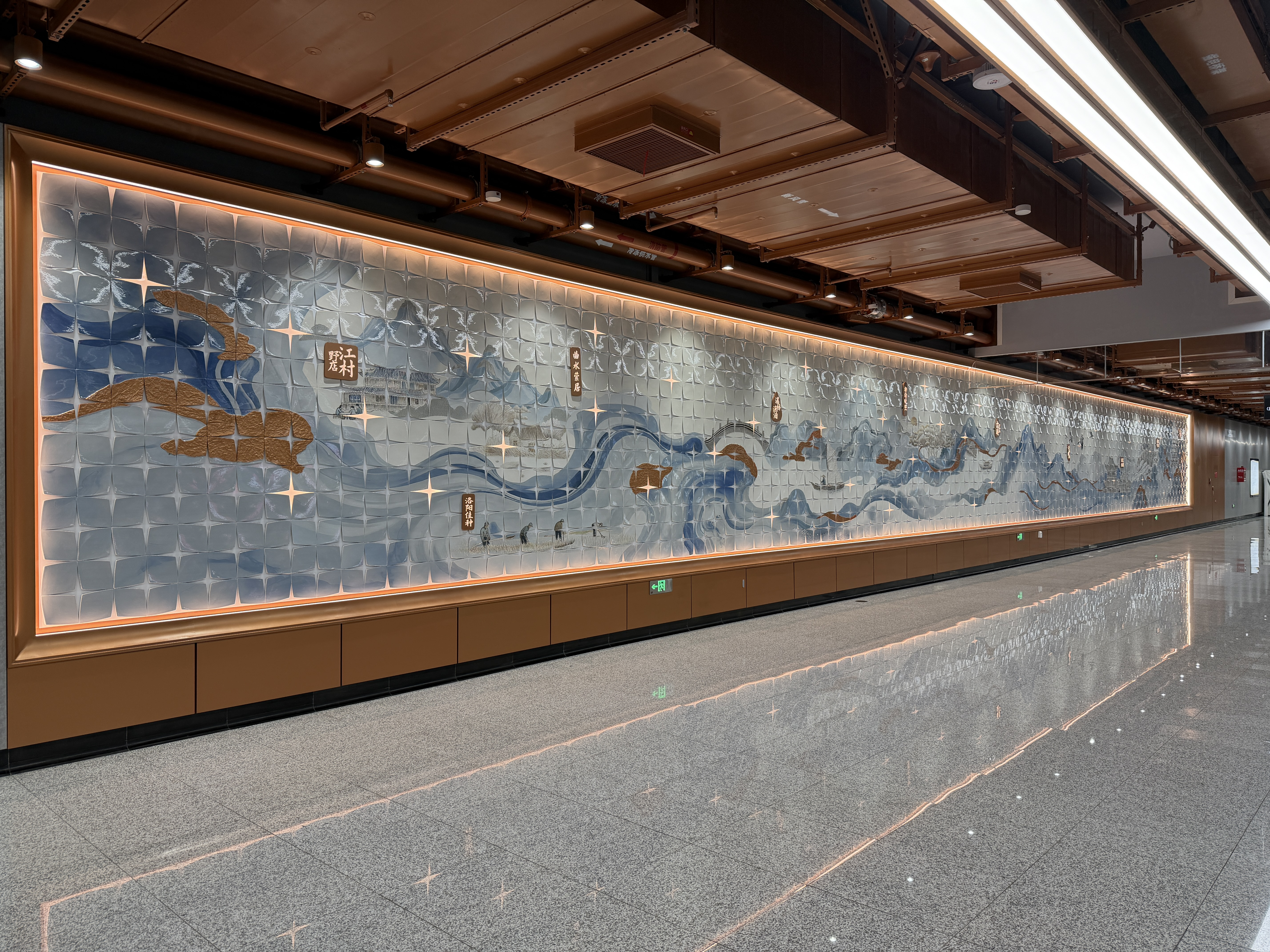
Concourse culture wall: "Ten Views of the Dragon" (蟠龙十景)

== History ==
On 28 June 2021, the station started construction. On 13 November 2022, the station site began excavation. On 10 December 2022, the station completed the cushion pouring of the end well. On 5 January 2023, all 8 floor plates of the foundation pit in Area D were poured. On 29 October 2024, the hot slip test at this station was successfully completed. On 23 September 2025, the site passed the initial safety assessment. On 1 November 2025, the station opened.
