= Xiabu =

Xiabu may refer to:

- Xiabu Xiabu, a chinese restaurant chain
- Hiabu, a Coahuiltecan tribe sometimes spelled Xiabu
