= Global Harbor (Shanghai) =

- 上海环球港

General information
- Status: Completed
- Type: Office, hotel, retail
- Location: 3300 North Zhongshan Road, Putuo District, Shanghai, China
- Coordinates: 31°14′3″N 121°24′28.4″E
- Construction started: 2008
- Opened: 5 July 2013

Height
- Height: 248.0 m (813.6 ft)

Technical details
- Floor count: 58
- Floor area: 480,000 m^{2} (5,166,700 sq ft)

Design and construction
- Architect: Chapman Taylor
- Developer: Yuexing Group Co. Ltd

Other information
- Parking: 2200

Global Harbor (Chinese: 上海环球港) is a large shopping mall in Shanghai, China. It opened on 5 July 2013.

The mall is located at 3300 North Zhongshan Road, near Jinshajiang Road, in the Putuo District of Shanghai. It is attached to Jinshajiang Road Station (on Shanghai Metro Line 3, Line 4, and Line 13) via an underground entrance. It has a floor area of 480,000 square meters. The shops are located on six levels (two of them basement levels), with an underground parking level below. Twin skyscrapers rise above the mall, which can be seen through the glass roof. In the evening they are lit with computer-controlled animated multi-coloured lighting on the surface of the outer walls.

The interior style, with its extravagant Rococo and Baroque design elements, has been noted for its resemblance to the Trafford Centre in Manchester, United Kingdom. Both shopping malls were designed by the same architects, Chapman Taylor.

East China Normal University is located close to the Global Harbor mall to the southwest. Beyond that southwest is Changfeng Park.

== Gallery ==
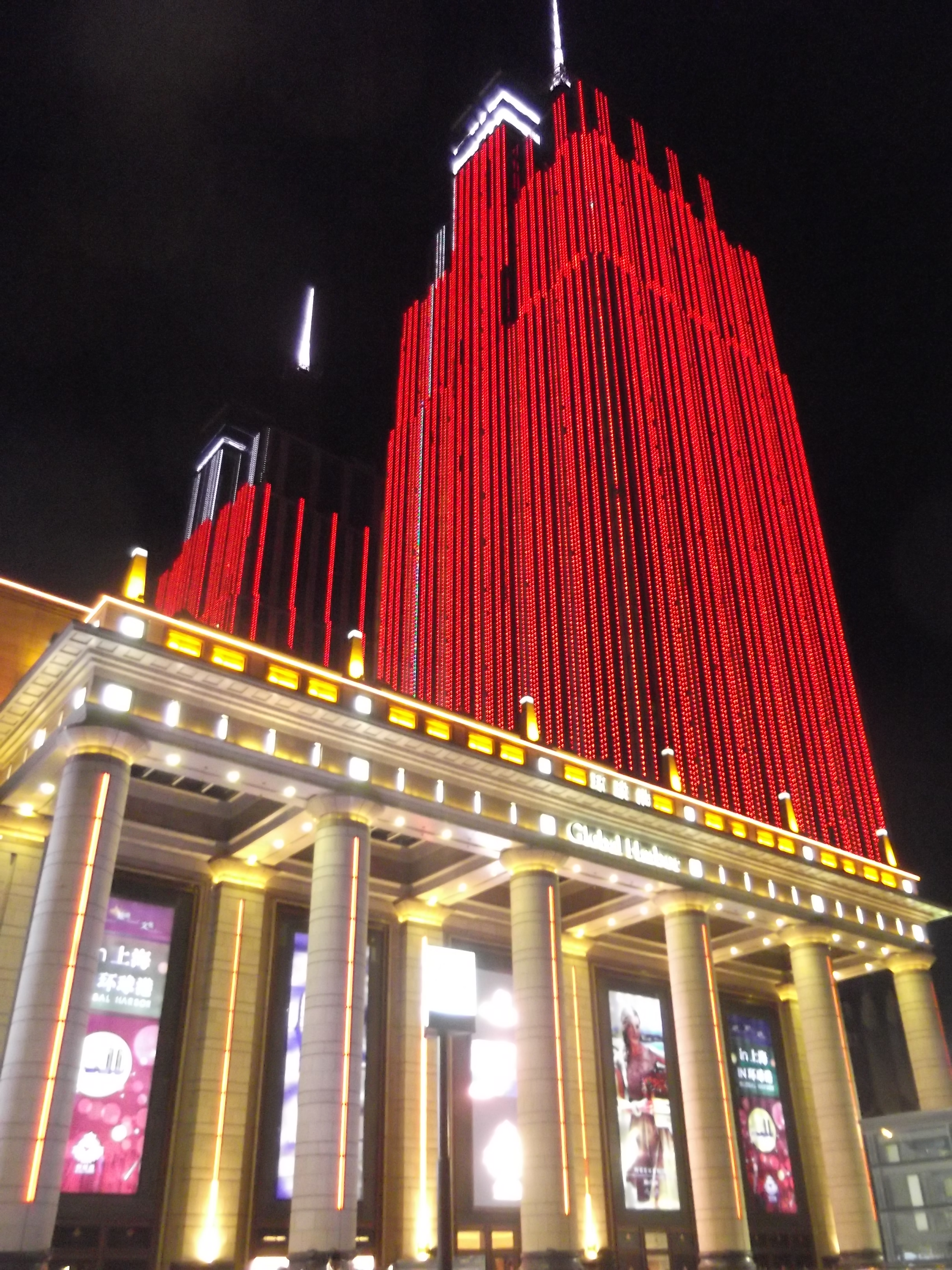

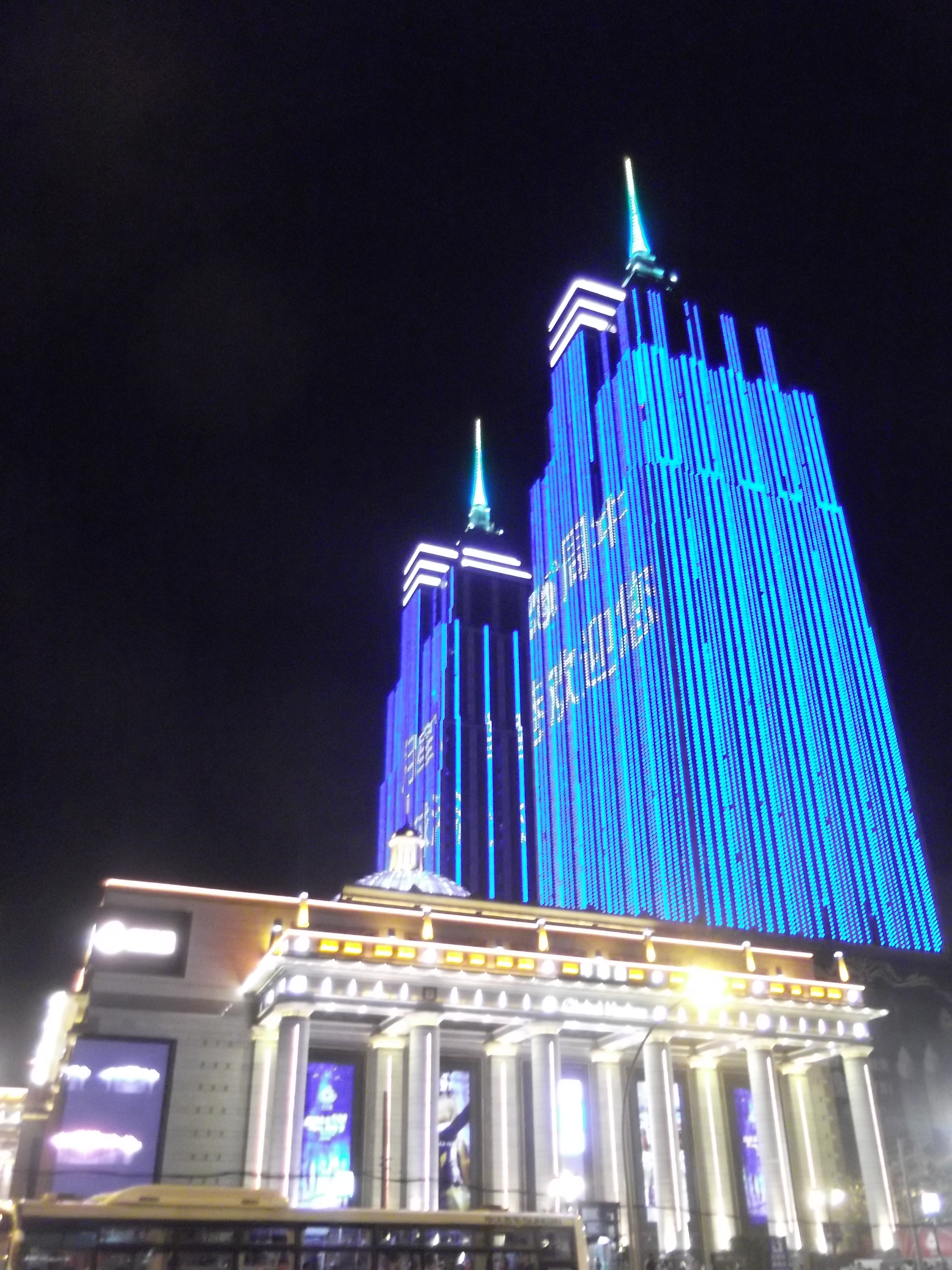

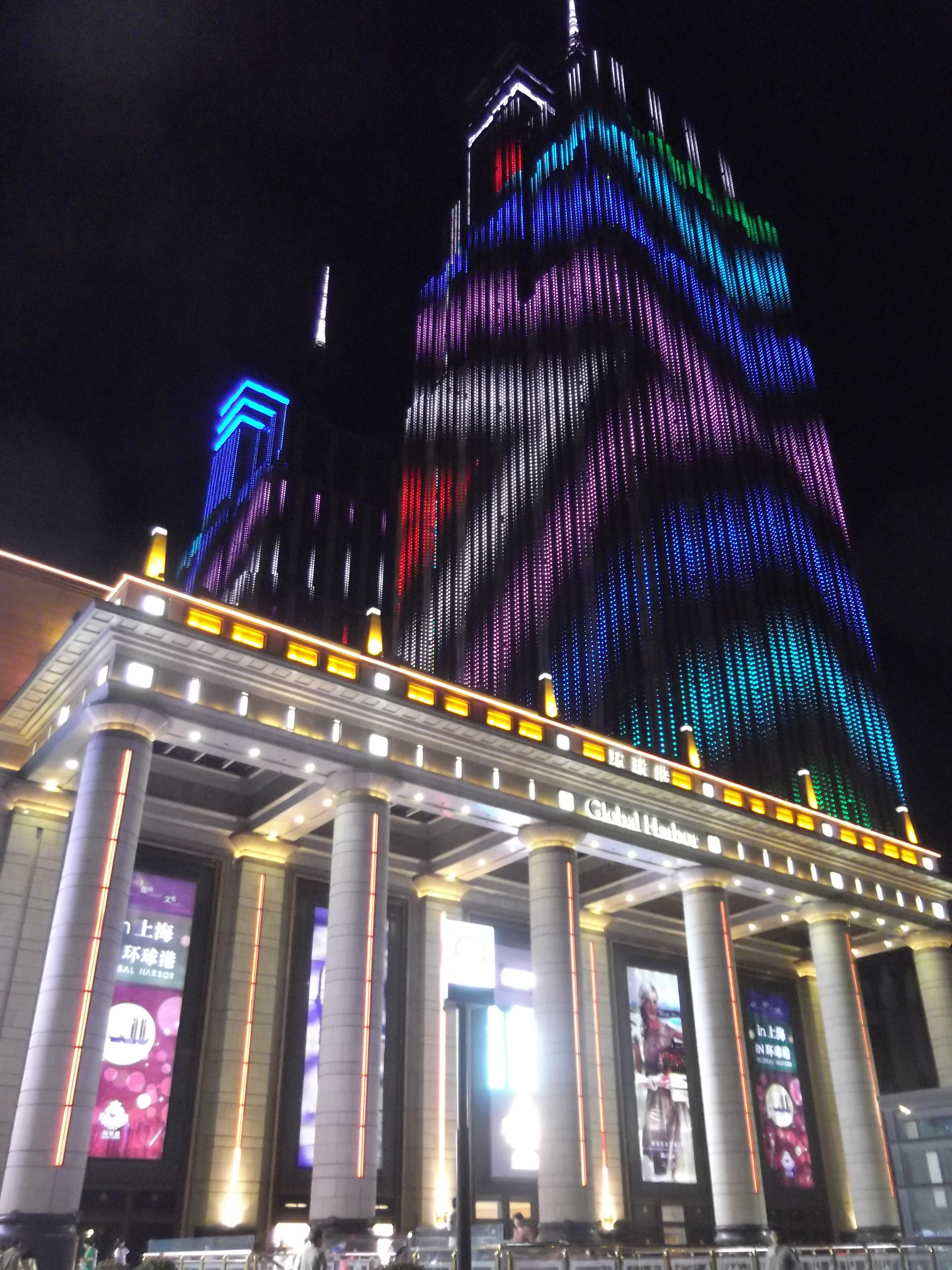

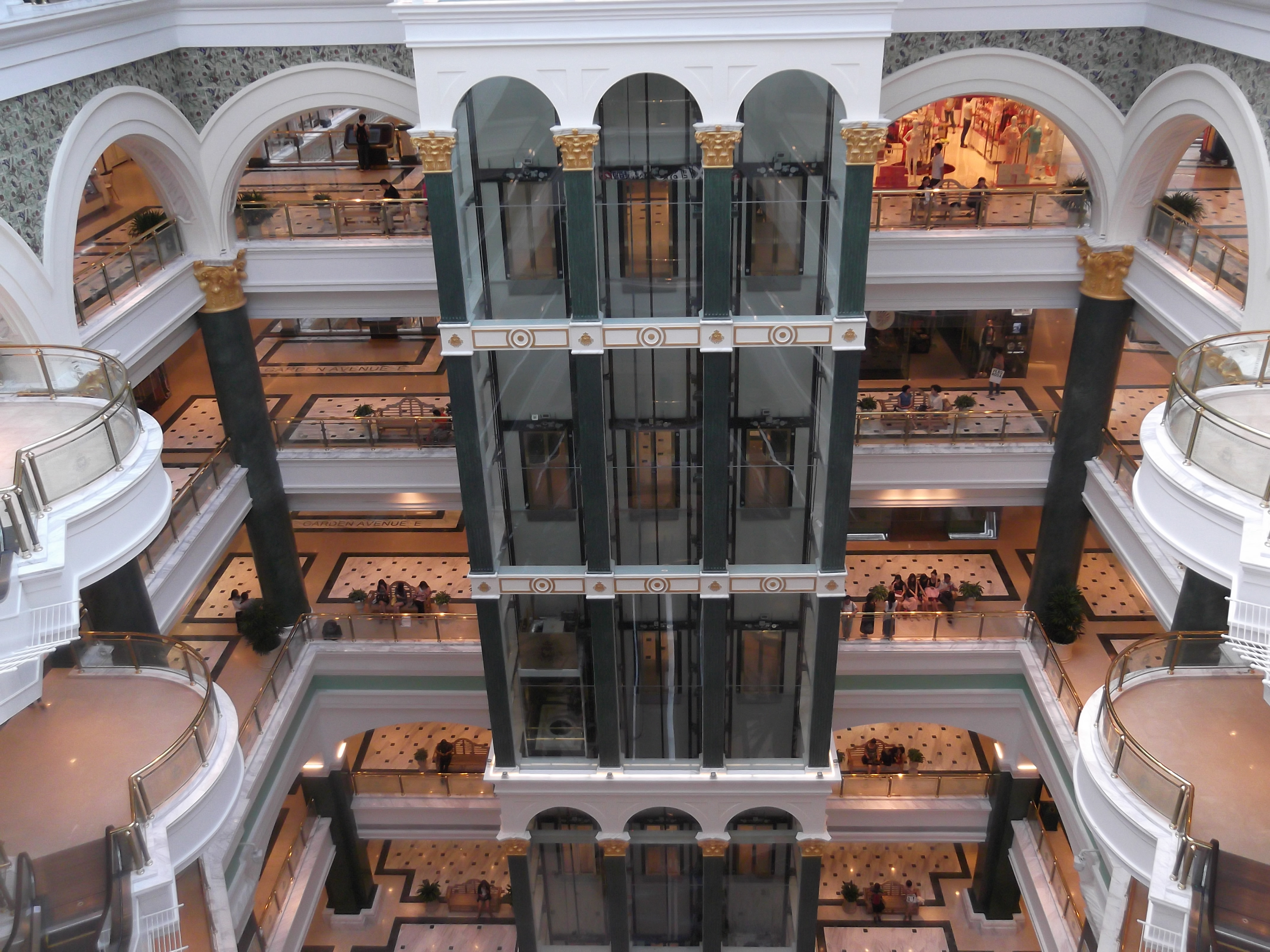
An atrium in Global Harbor

== See also ==
- List of shopping malls in China
- Cloud Nine, a shopping mall at Zhongshan Park to the south
