= MG iEV12 =

Battery electric bus

Overview
- Manufacturer: SAIC Motor
- Assembly: China

Body and chassis
- Floor type: Low-floor

Powertrain
- Battery: 417 or 489 kWh
- Electric range: 400 km (250 mi)

Dimensions
- Wheelbase: 6,000 mm (236.2 in)
- Kerb weight: 19,500 kg (43,000 lb)

The MG iEV12 is an upcoming battery electric city bus to be produced by Chinese automaker SAIC Motor under the MG Commercial sub-brand. It is the first bus to be marketed under the MG marque.

== History ==
In October 2025, MG announced MG Commercial, a new sub-brand for medium and large-sized electric buses. The new brand represents a wider strategy by SAIC to produce electrified vehicles in various categories including car, van and bus.

The MG iEV12 concept debuted that month at Busworld in Brussels; as of 2025, it remains a concept with no production plans. MG has described it as "a bold fusion of classic MG heritage and cutting-edge electric innovation".

== Specifications ==
Rear view

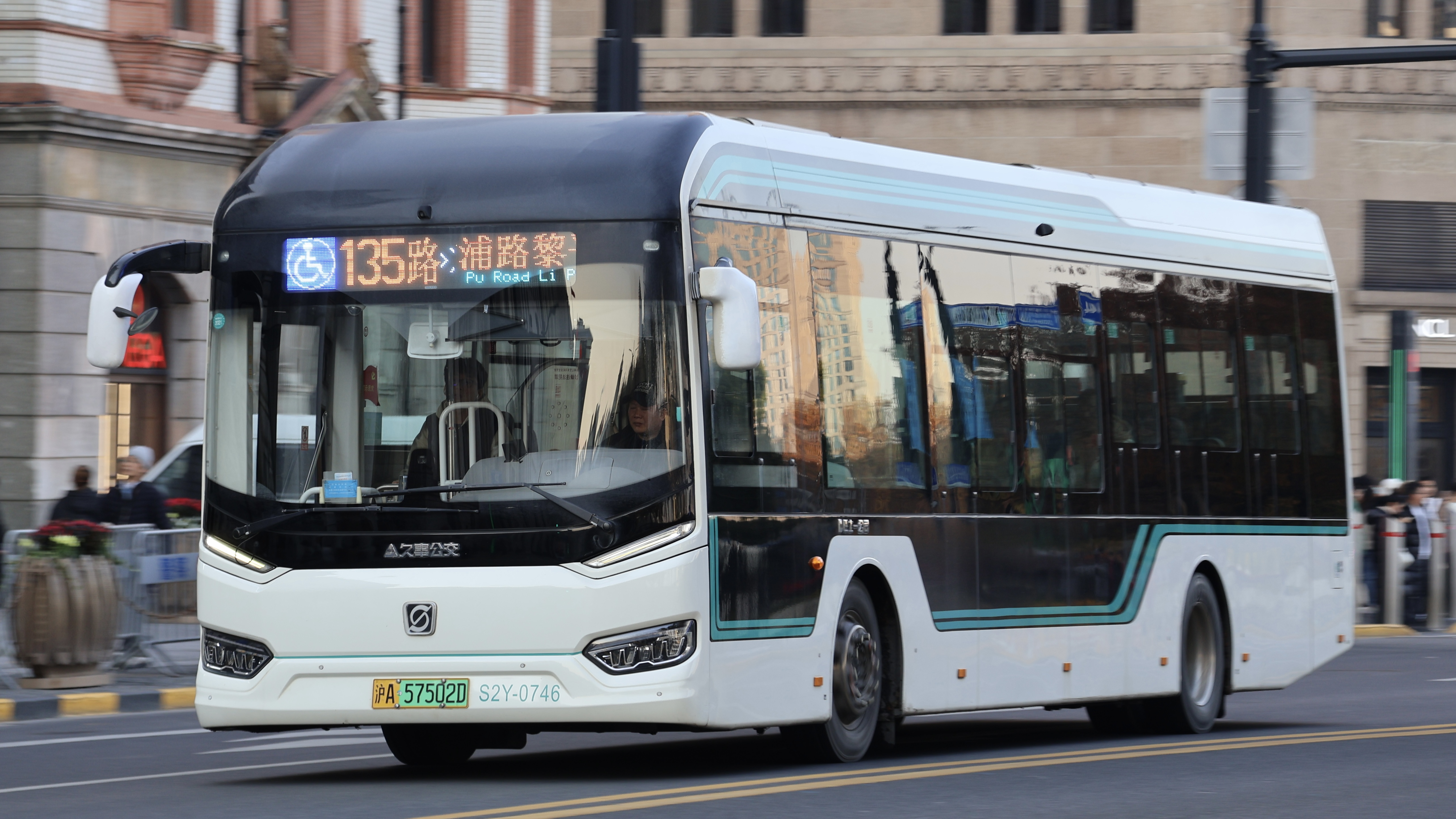
The exterior of the MG iEV12 is based on the Sunwin Series 9 (pictured in Shanghai).

The MG iEV12 was designed at SAIC's UK design studio and developed in Europe in cooperation with SAIC's Sunwin unit. The exterior of the bus is based on the Series 9 buses produced by Sunwin. It is built on the MG B12E electric chassis and integrates cell-to-pack battery technology with a battery pack height of 140 mm (5.5 in) and a total system capacity of 417 or 489 kWh, depending on configuration. The iEV12 supports both opportunity and socket charging.
