= West Yan'an Road station =

Shanghai Metro station

West Yan'an Road 延安西路
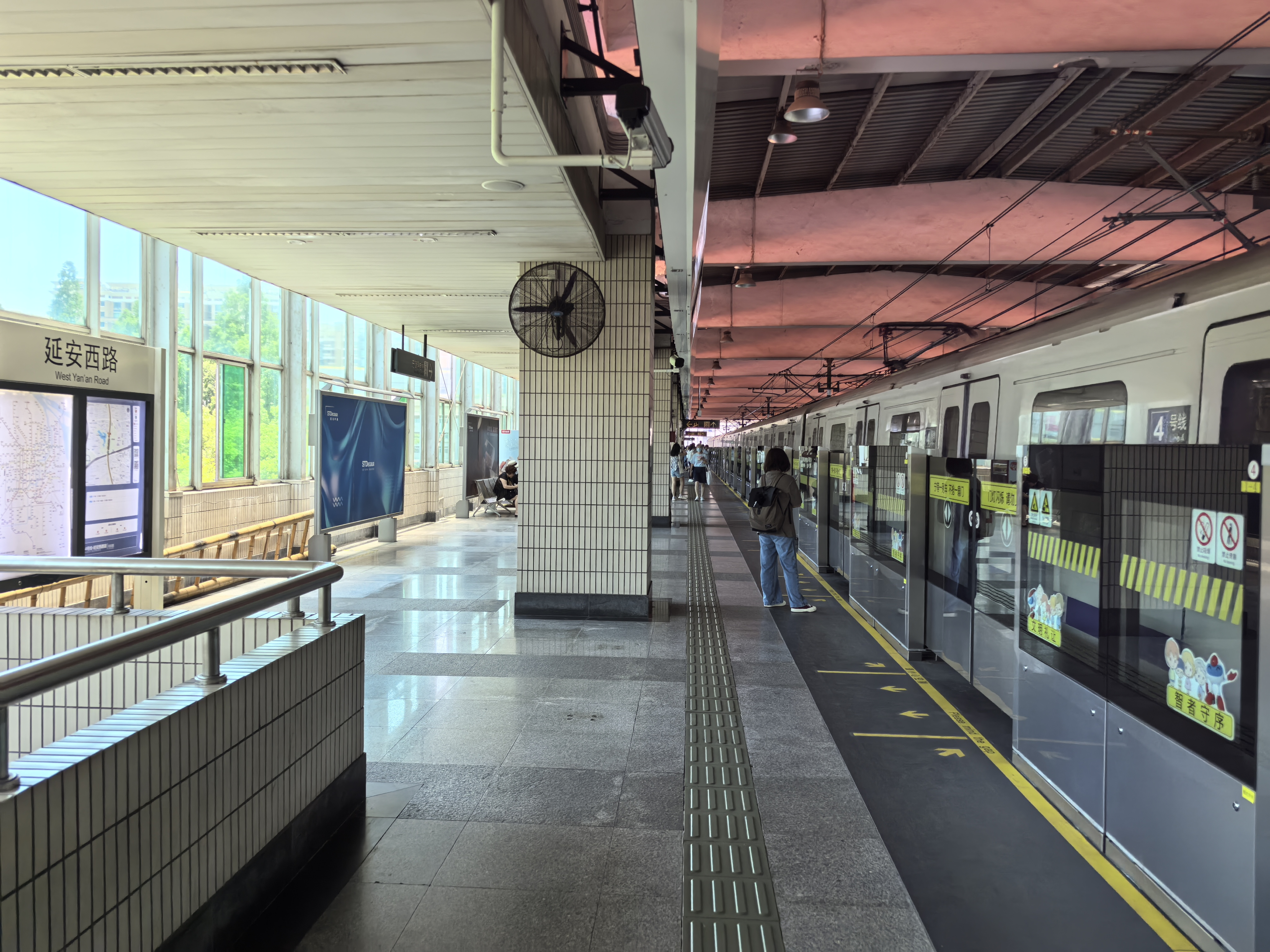
- Station platform

General information
- Location: Kaixuan Road (凯旋路) and West Yan'an Road; Changning District, Shanghai; China
- Coordinates: 31°12′35″N 121°25′01″E
- Operator: Shanghai No. 3 Metro Operation Co. Ltd.
- Lines: Line 3; Line 4
- Platforms: 2 (2 side platforms)
- Tracks: 2

Construction
- Structure type: Elevated
- Accessible: Yes

History
- Opened: 26 December 2000; 25 years ago (Line 3); 31 December 2005; 20 years ago (Line 4)

Services
| Preceding station | Shanghai Metro | Following station |
|---|---|---|
| Zhongshan Park towards North Jiangyang Road | Line 3 | Hongqiao Road towards Shanghai South Railway Station |
| Zhongshan Park Clockwise | Line 4 | Hongqiao Road Counter-clockwise |
Location
- Location within Shanghai

West Yan'an Road (Chinese: 延安西路; pinyin: Yán'ān Xī Lù) is an interchange station between Lines 3 and 4 on the Shanghai Metro network. The station is named after Yan'an Road, and opened on 26 December 2000 as part of the initial section of Line 3 from Shanghai South Railway Station to Jiangwan Town, and Line 4 service began here on the final day of 2005.

During the 2021 Shanghai People’s Congress, deputies suggested to change the station name to Donghua University. Wang Hongzhi, vice dean of the College of Materials Science and Engineering at Donghua University, argued that the names of metro stations should reflect local and cultural landmarks, including universities.

== Gallery ==
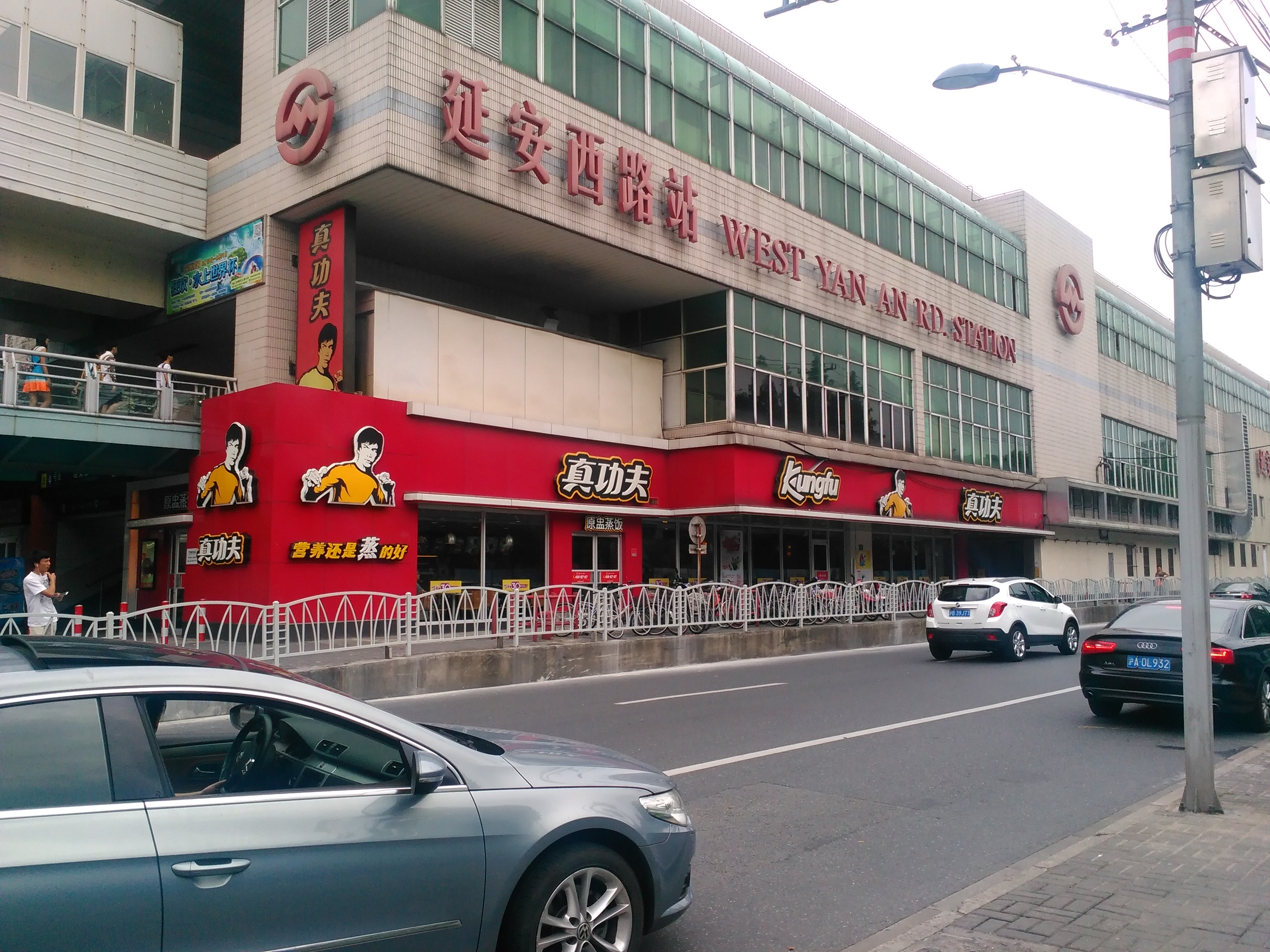
Exterior with a Kung Fu chain restaurant

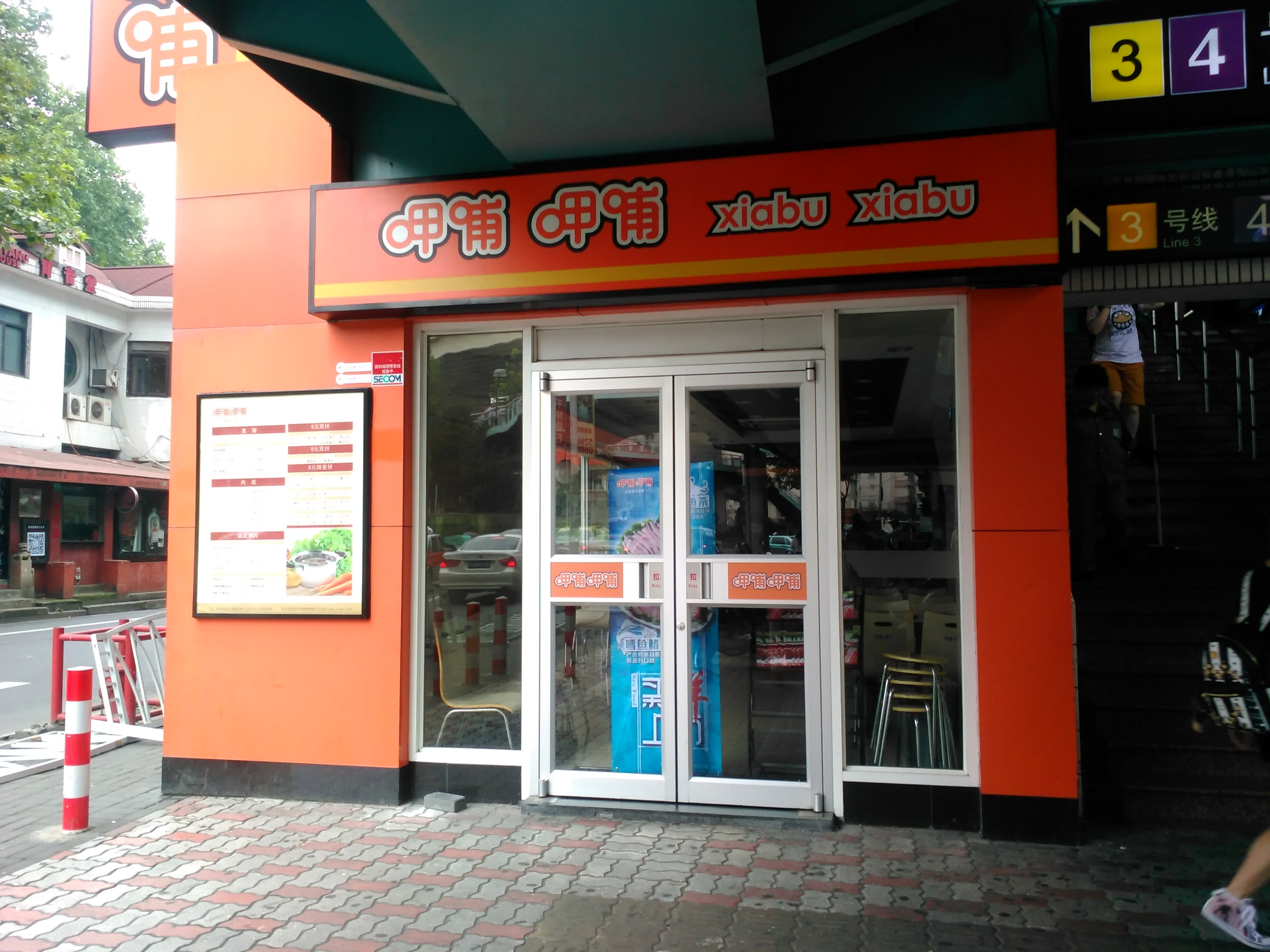
Xiabu Xiabu restaurant

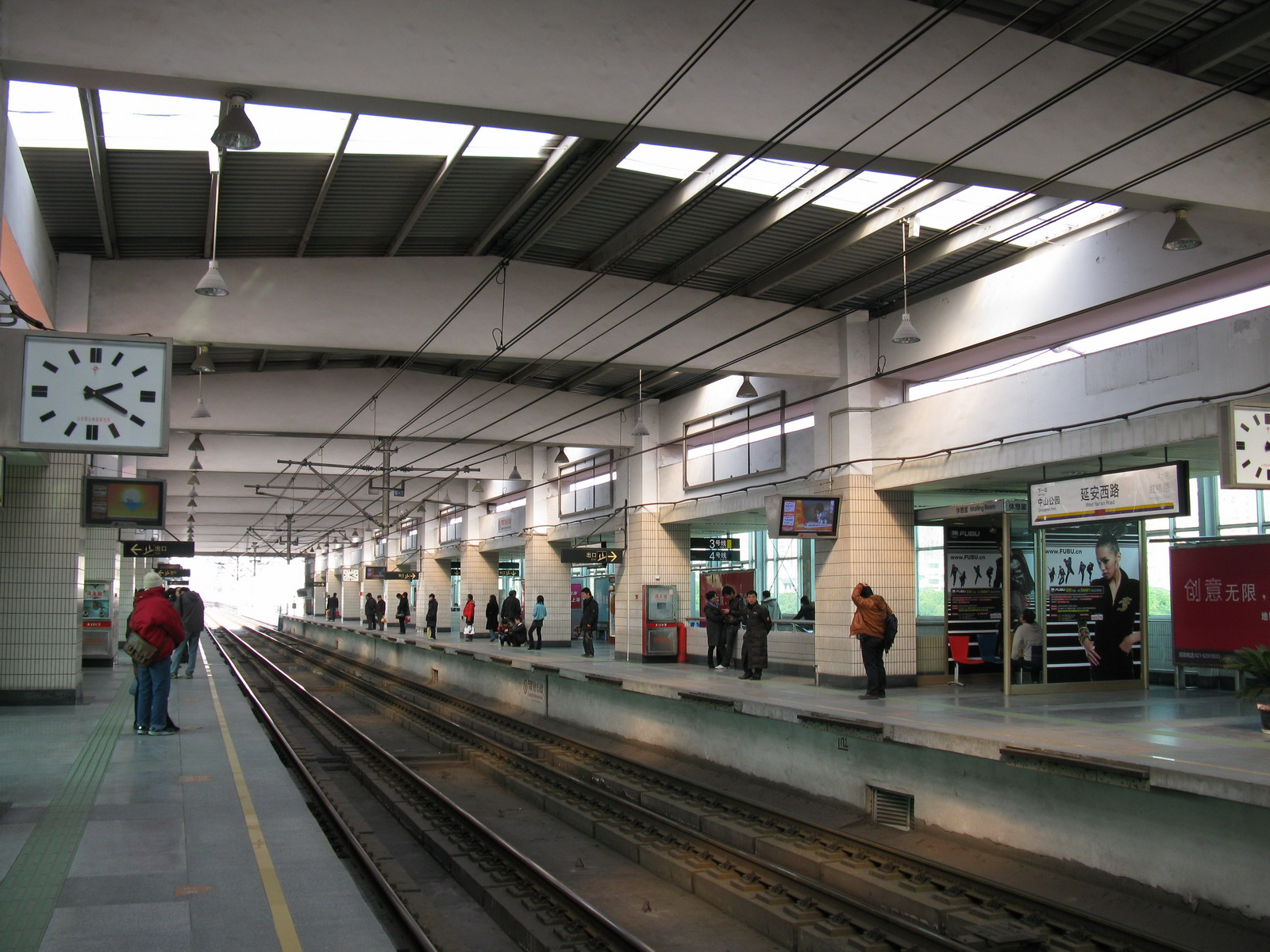
West Yan'an Road station in 2008
