= Changfeng Park station =

Metro station in Shanghai, China

Changfeng Park 长风公园
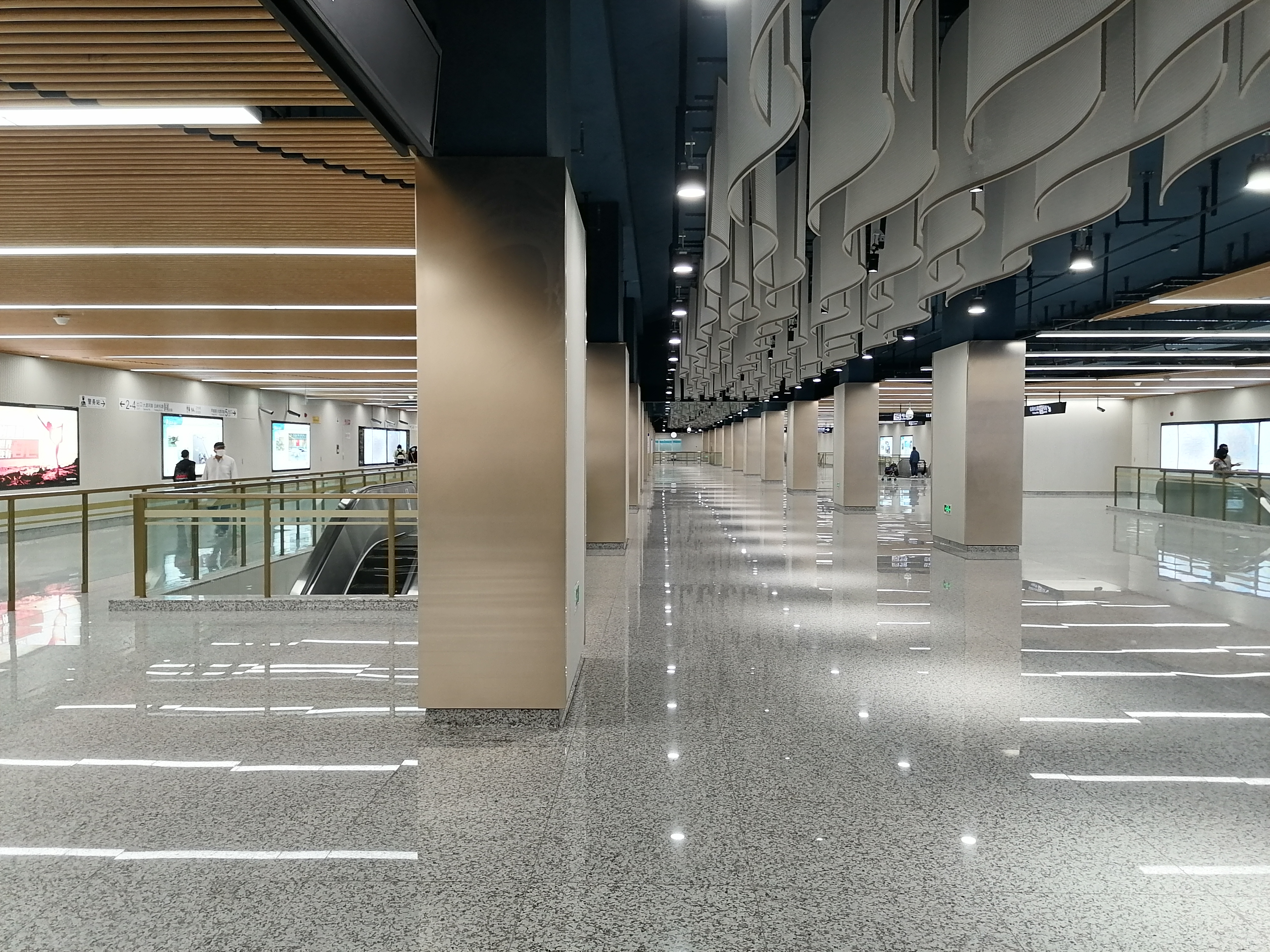
- Concourse

General information
- Location: Daduhe Road and East Yunling Road, Putuo District, Shanghai; China
- Coordinates: 31.22768°N 121.3915°E
- Line: Line 15
- Platforms: 3 (1 island platform and 1 side platform)
- Tracks: 2

Construction
- Structure type: Underground
- Accessible: Yes

History
- Opened: 23 January 2021

Services
Preceding station	Shanghai Metro	Following station
Daduhe Road towards Gucun Park	Line 15	Loushanguan Road towards Zizhu Hi-tech Park
Location

Changfeng Park (simplified Chinese: 长风公园; traditional Chinese: 長風公園; pinyin: Chángfēng Gōngyuán) is a metro station on the Line 15 of the Shanghai Metro. Located at the intersection of Daduhe Road and East Yunling Road in Putuo District, Shanghai, the station is scheduled to open with the rest of Line 15 by the end of 2020. The station is named after the nearby Changfeng Park. It is located in between Daduhe Road station to the north and Loushanguan Road station to the south. The station has 3 platforms, one island and one side platform. The inner island platform is not in service. Trains heading to Zi-Zhu Hi-Tech Park use the outer island platform, whilst trains towards Gucun Park use the side platform.
