= Kungfu (restaurant) =

Chinese fast food restaurant chain

Guangzhou Real Kungfu Catering Management Co., Ltd.
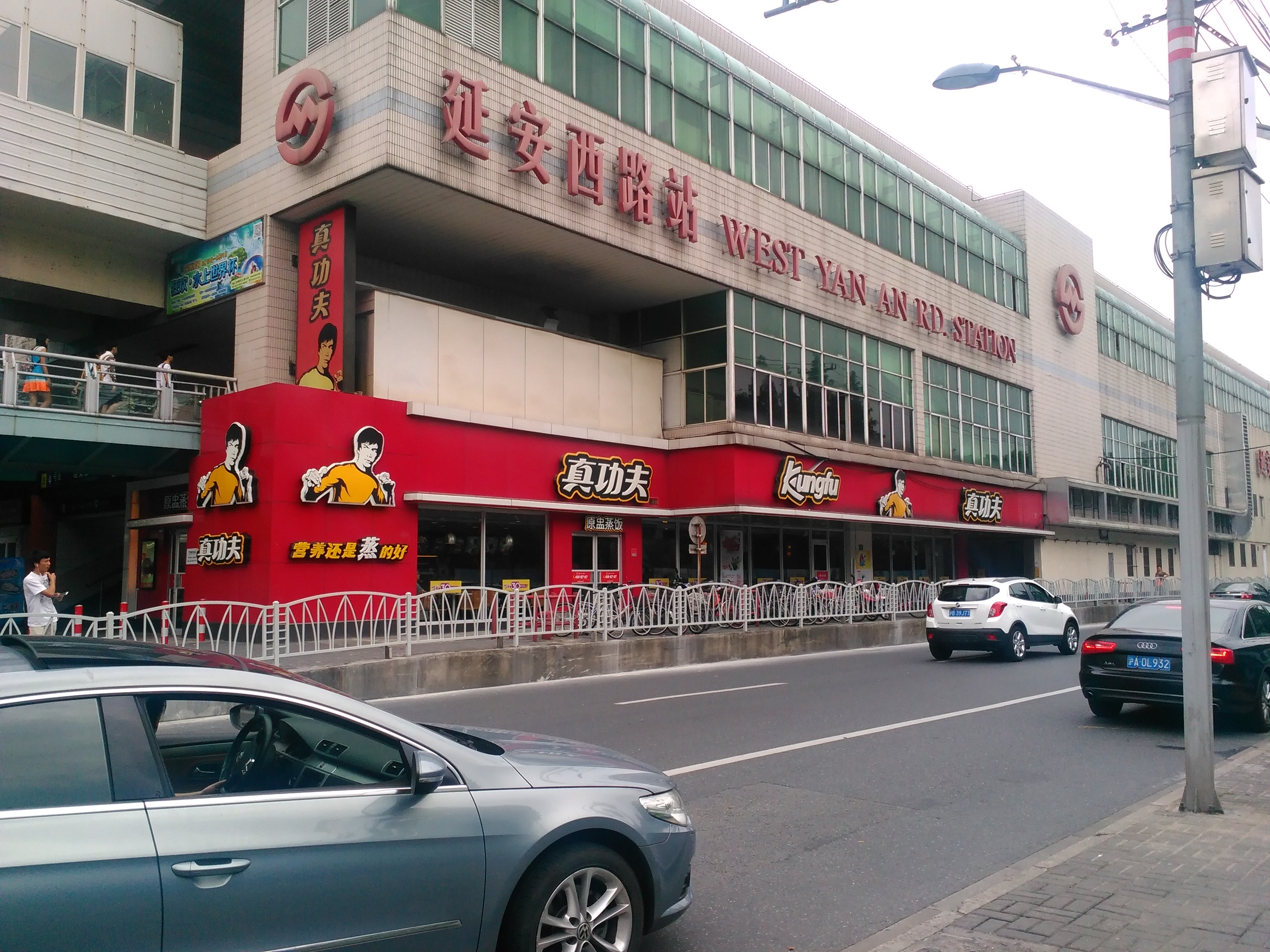
- Location at West Yan'an Road Station in Shanghai
- Traditional Chinese: 廣州真功夫餐飲管理有限公司
- Simplified Chinese: 广州真功夫餐饮管理有限公司
Transcriptions
Standard Mandarin
- Hanyu Pinyin: Guǎngzhōu Zhēn Gōngfu Cānyǐn Guǎnlǐ Yǒuxiàngōngsī

Guangzhou Real Kungfu Catering Management Co., Ltd., trading as Kungfu (Chinese: 真功夫; pinyin: Zhēn Gōngfu; lit. 'Real Kung Fu'), is a fast-food chain in China, headquartered in Tianhe District, Guangzhou. The first restaurant opened in 1990 and in 2011, the company had over 300 locations in China. As of 2013 it had 479 restaurants. It sells bowls of rice with meats such as beef and pork.

In 2014, China Daily ranked Kungfu as No. 8 in its list of Top 10 Fast-food restaurants in China.

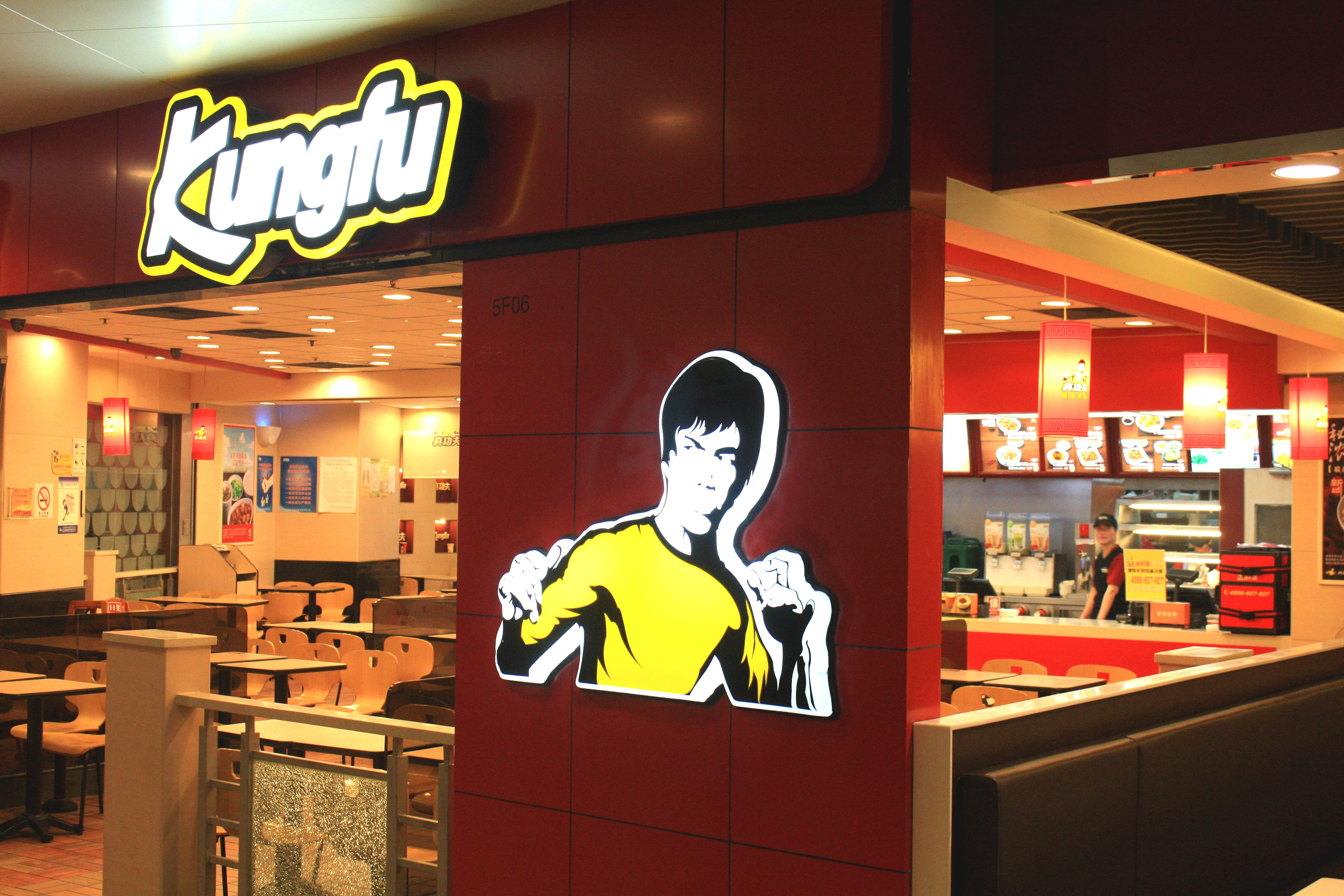
Restaurant Interior in Shanghai

In 2019, Kungfu was involved in a portrait rights infringement dispute, but still hasn't changed its 'Bruce Lee' logo.

== Bruce Lee image ==
The company's logo incorporates an image resembling the martial artist Bruce Lee, depicting a dark haired man in a kung fu pose, wearing a yellow top not unlike the famous yellow tracksuit worn by him in the posthumously-released Game of Death. Many of the chain's 300-plus restaurants across China feature large, black and white murals of a man who bears a strong resemblance to him. The company says it did not engage in discussion with his family prior to using the images, but added that they are not meant to represent Lee.

== Company History ==
In 1990, Kungfu originated in Chang 'an, Dongguan. In 1997, Kungfu independently developed a computer-controlled steam cabinet, taking the lead in solving the problem of "standardization" of Chinese food. Exploring a new way for the development of Chinese fast food.

As the first Chinese fast-food chain in China, Kungfu has three logistics centers in south China, east China, and north China, and is responsible for the procurement, processing, and distribution of all restaurant food. By March 2014, the number of Kungfu restaurants has reached 570, covering nearly 40 cities including Beijing, Shanghai, Guangzhou, Shenzhen, Wuhan, Hangzhou, Chengdu, Changsha, etc., with nearly 20,000 employees nationwide.

== Infringement ==
On December 25, 2019, Kungfu was sued by Shannon Lee, daughter of Bruce Lee, claiming it had used the Bruce Lee icon for years and demanded an immediate stop to the use of Bruce Lee's image, seeking RMB 210 million in damages. On December 26, Kungfu issued a statement, ready to actively respond to the prosecution and said that this logo is legally approved by China's National Intellectual Property Administration (CNIPA) after the strict examination.

== Shareholder disputes ==
The dispute between Kungfu's two main shareholders, Pan and Cai, lasted for several years. Cai was sentenced to 14 years in prison for embezzlement while in office. It took Pan a long time to find a solution to the huge amount of money that had been embezzled from Cai.
