= Zhongshan Park station (Shanghai Metro) =

Shanghai Metro interchange station

Zhongshan Park 中山公园
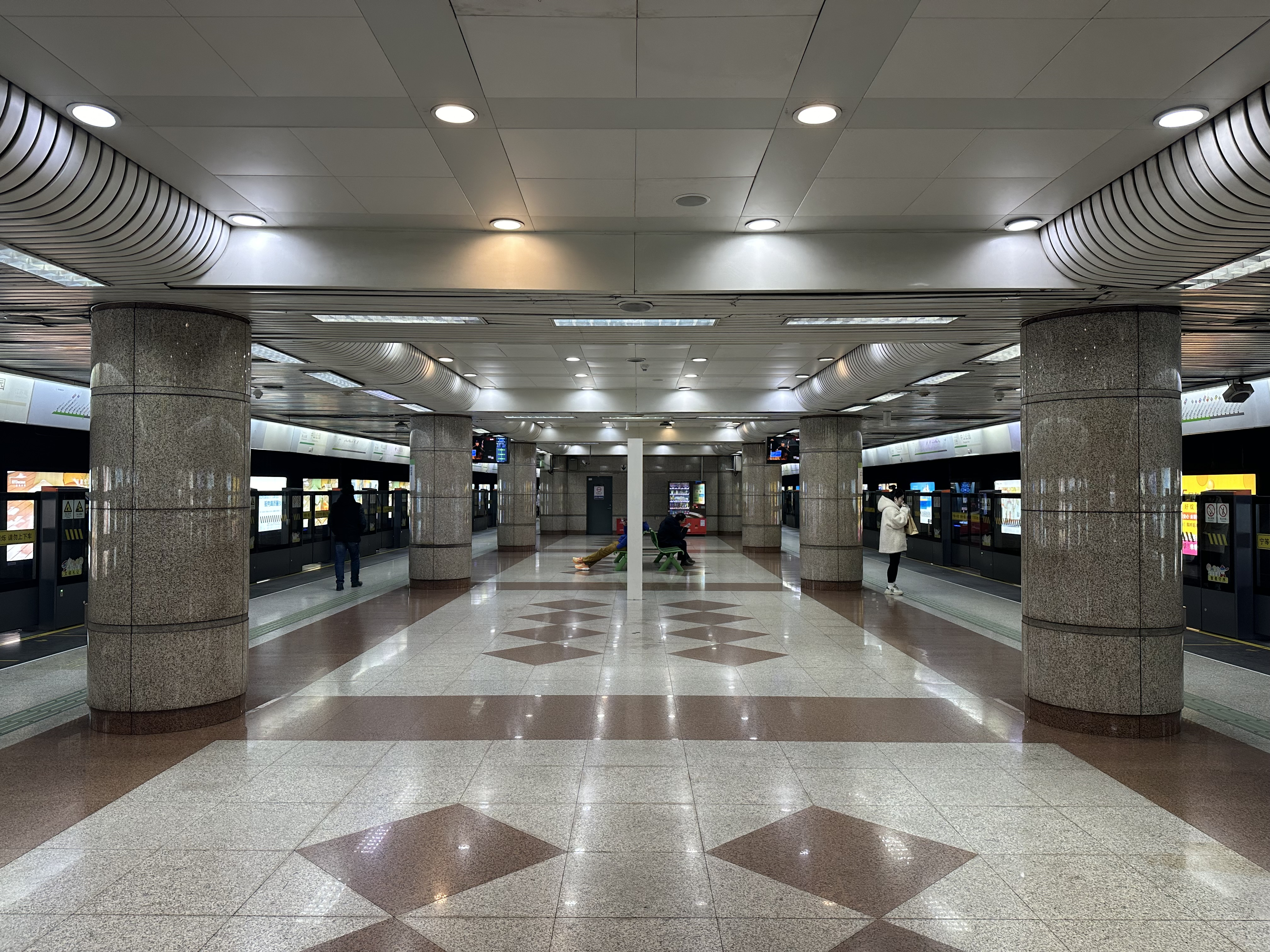
- Line 2 platform

General information
- Location: near Zhongshan Park, Changning District, Shanghai; China
- Coordinates: 31°13′05″N 121°24′57″E
- Operator: Shanghai No. 2/3 Metro Operation Co. Ltd.
- Lines: Line 2; Line 3; Line 4
- Platforms: 4 (2 island platforms)
- Tracks: 4

Construction
- Structure type: Underground (Line 2); Elevated (Lines 3 & 4)
- Accessible: Yes

History
- Opened: 20 September 1999; 26 years ago (Line 2); 27 December 2000; 25 years ago (Line 3); 31 December 2005; 20 years ago (Line 4)

Services
Preceding station	Shanghai Metro	Following station
Loushanguan Road towards Panxiang Road · Shanghai National Accounting Institute	Line 2	Jiangsu Road towards Pudong Airport Terminal 1&2
Jinshajiang Road towards North Jiangyang Road	Line 3	West Yan'an Road towards Shanghai South Railway Station
Jinshajiang Road Clockwise	Line 4	West Yan'an Road Counter-clockwise
Location
- Location within Shanghai

Zhongshan Park (Chinese: 中山公园; pinyin: Zhōngshān Gōngyuán) is an interchange station between Lines 2, 3 and 4 on the Shanghai Metro, named after Shanghai's largest commercial park which is located nearby. This station served as the western terminus of Line 2 from the line's opening on 20 September 1999 until the first westward extension to Songhong Road opened on 30 December 2006. The interchanges with Lines 3 and 4 opened on 27 December 2000 and the final day of 2005, respectively, and are part of both lines' initial sections. Immediately to the northeast of the station is the Cloud Nine shopping mall, visible from the elevated Lines 3 and 4.

== Station layout ==
3F		← Line 3 towards North Jiangyang Road (Jinshajiang Road) ← Line 4 clockwise (Jinshajiang Road)
3F	Island platform, doors open on the left
3F		Line 3 towards Shanghai South Railway Station (West Yan'an Road) → Line 4 counter-clockwise (West Yan'an Road) →
2F	Lines 3 & 4 north concourse	Tickets, Service Center, exit to Longemont shopping mall
2F	Lines 3 & 4 south concourse	Tickets, Service Center, exit to Raffles City Changning
1F	Ground level	Exits
B1	Line 2 concourse	Tickets, Service Center
B2	Platform 1	← Line 2 towards Panxiang Road · Shanghai National Accounting Institute (Loushanguan Road)
B2	Island platform, doors open on the left
B2	Platform 2	Line 2 towards Pudong Airport Terminal 1&2 (Jiangsu Road) →

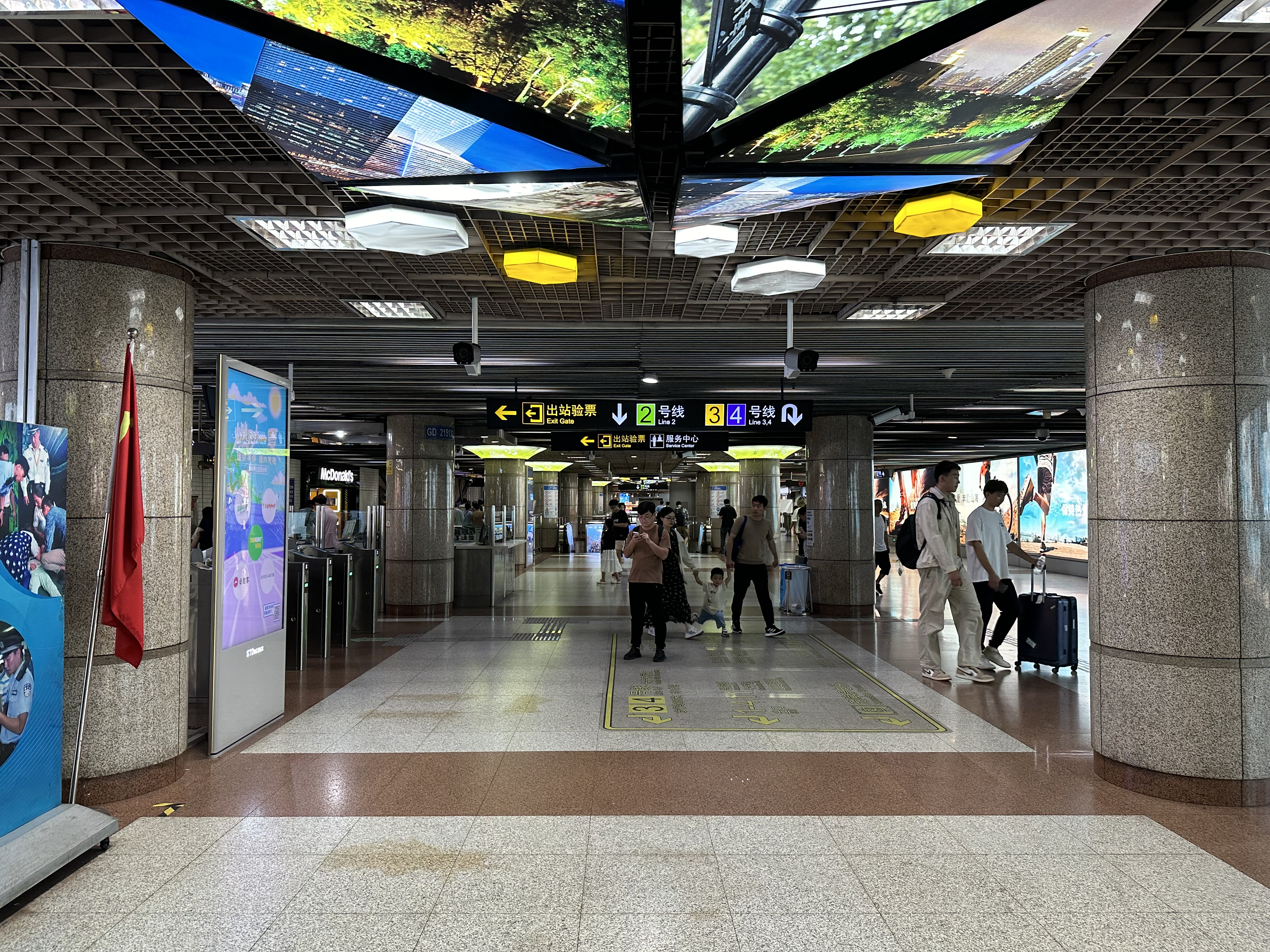
Line 2 concourse

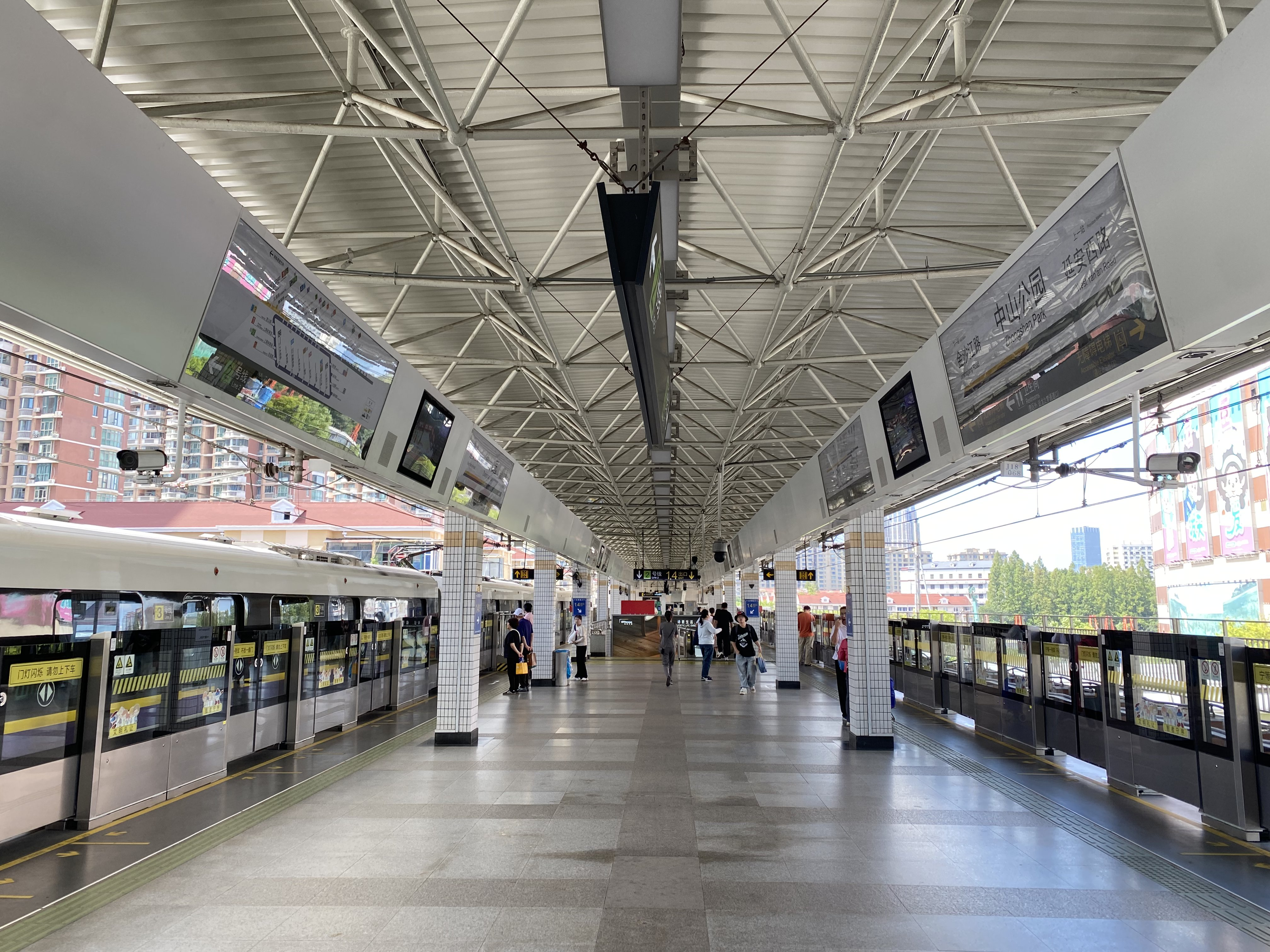
Lines 3 and 4 platform

=== Entrances/exits ===
Zhongshan Park has eleven exits with code. The code were separated between Line 2 and Line 3/4 before September 30, 2022. Exits 1 and 4 connect Lines 3 and 4 north concourse and 2 and 3 connect south. Exits 5-11 belong to Line 2.

- 1: Kaixuan Road, Changning Road, Huichuan Road
- 2: Kaixuan Road, Changning Road, Huichuan Road
- 3: Changning Road, West Zhongshan Road
- 4: Changning Road, West Zhongshan Road
- 5: Kaixuan Road, Changning Road
- 6: Changning Road, Huichuan Road
- 7: Changning Road, Zhongshan Park, Changning People's Government
- 8: Dingxi Road, Yuyuan Road, Changning People's Government
- 9: Changning Road
- 10: Huichuan Road, Changning Road
- 11: Changning Road, Kaixuan Road

== Places nearby ==
- Zhongshan Park
- Longemont shopping mall
- East China Normal University
- East China University of Science and Technology
- Suzhou Creek, crossed by Lines 3 and 4 just north of Zhongshan Park
