= Longemont =

- 龙之梦
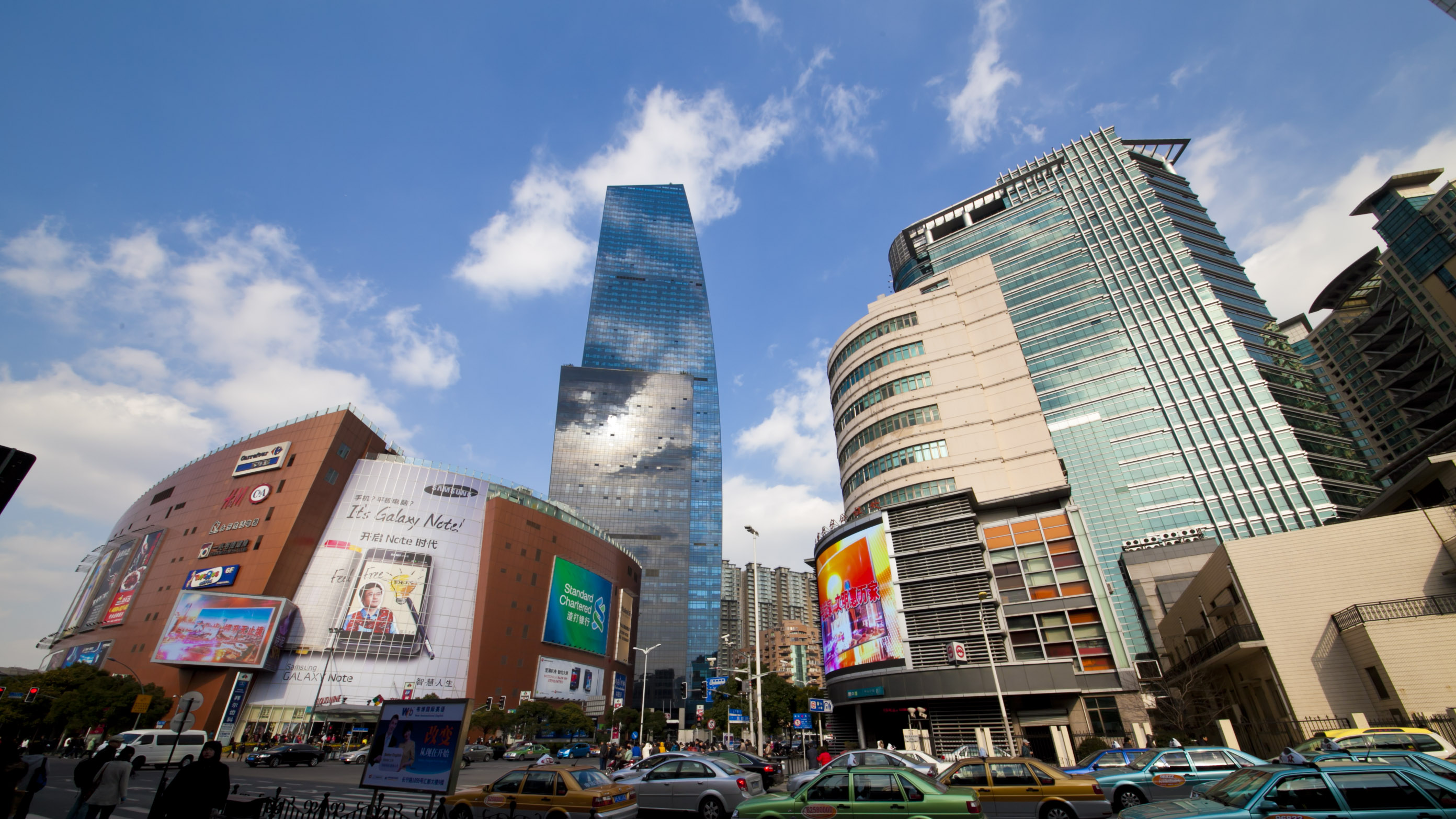
- View of Longemont
- Interactive map of the Longemont area

General information
- Type: Office, hotel, retail
- Location: Changning District, Shanghai, China
- Coordinates: 31.221°N 121.412°E
- Construction started: 2001
- Completed: 2006

Height
- Height: 238.0 m (781 ft)

Technical details
- Floor count: 60
- Floor area: 300,000 m^{2} (3,200,000 sq ft)

Design and construction
- Architect: Arquitectonica

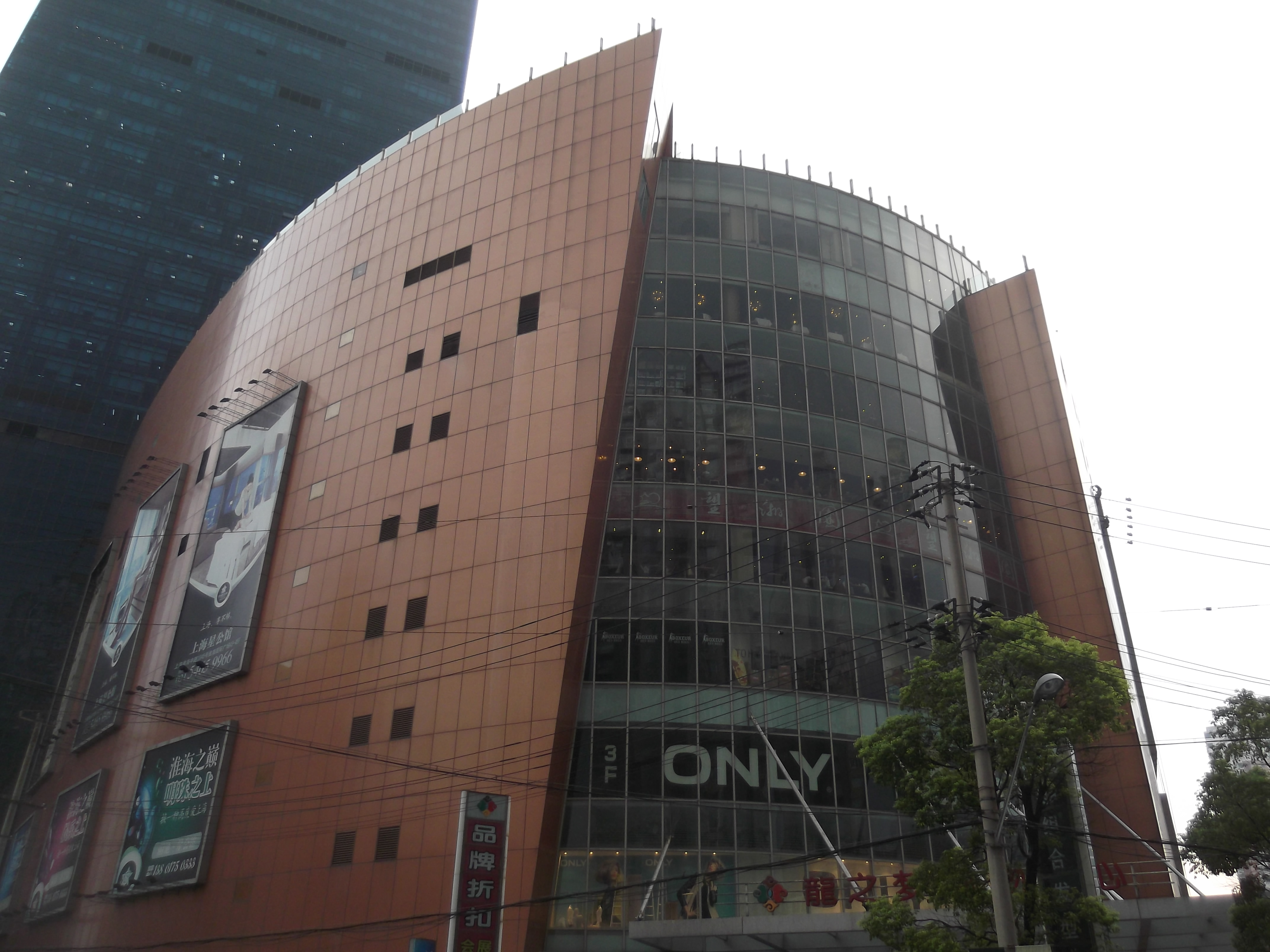
An entrance to the Longemont shopping mall

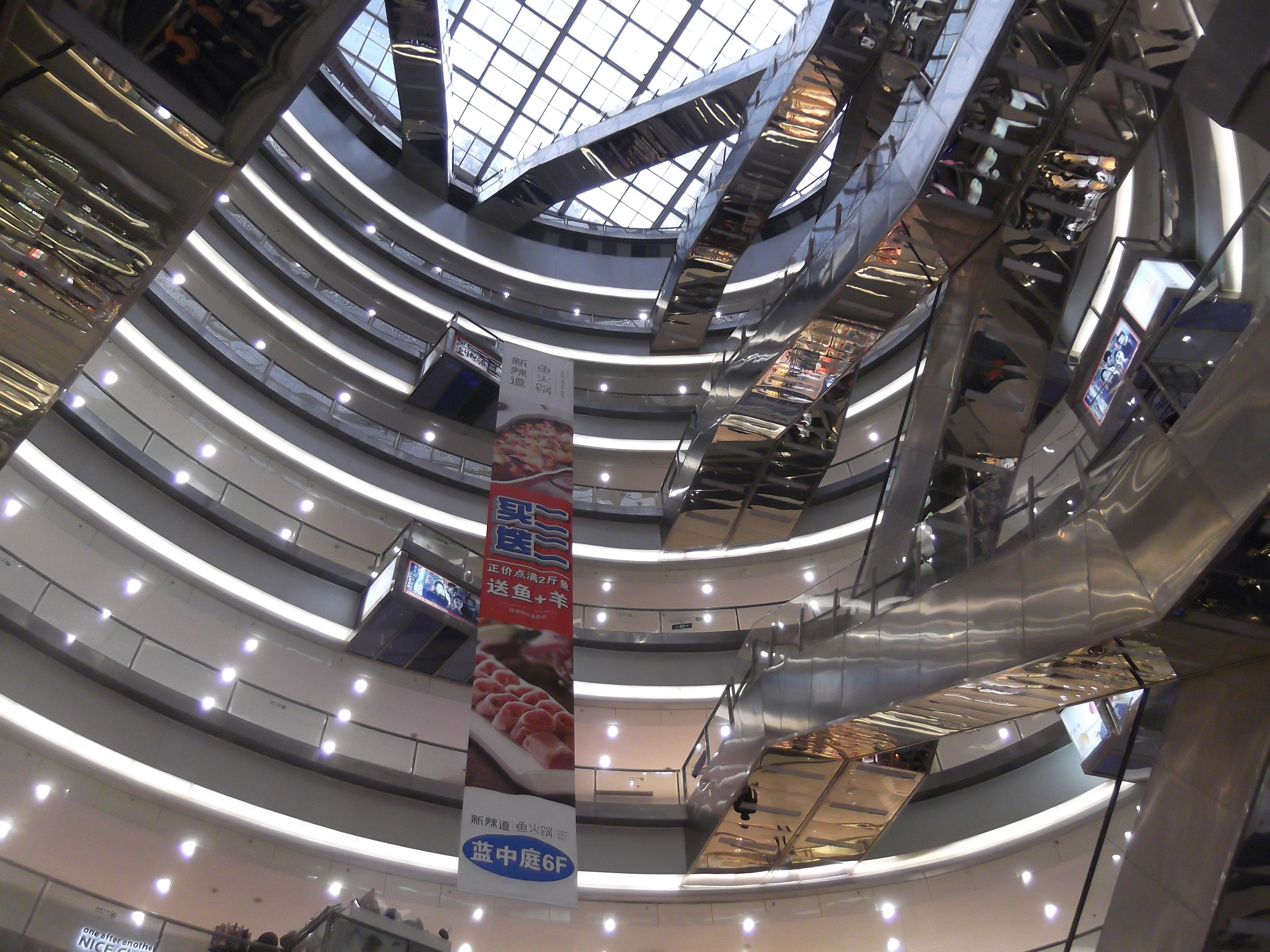
An atrium in the Longemont shopping mall

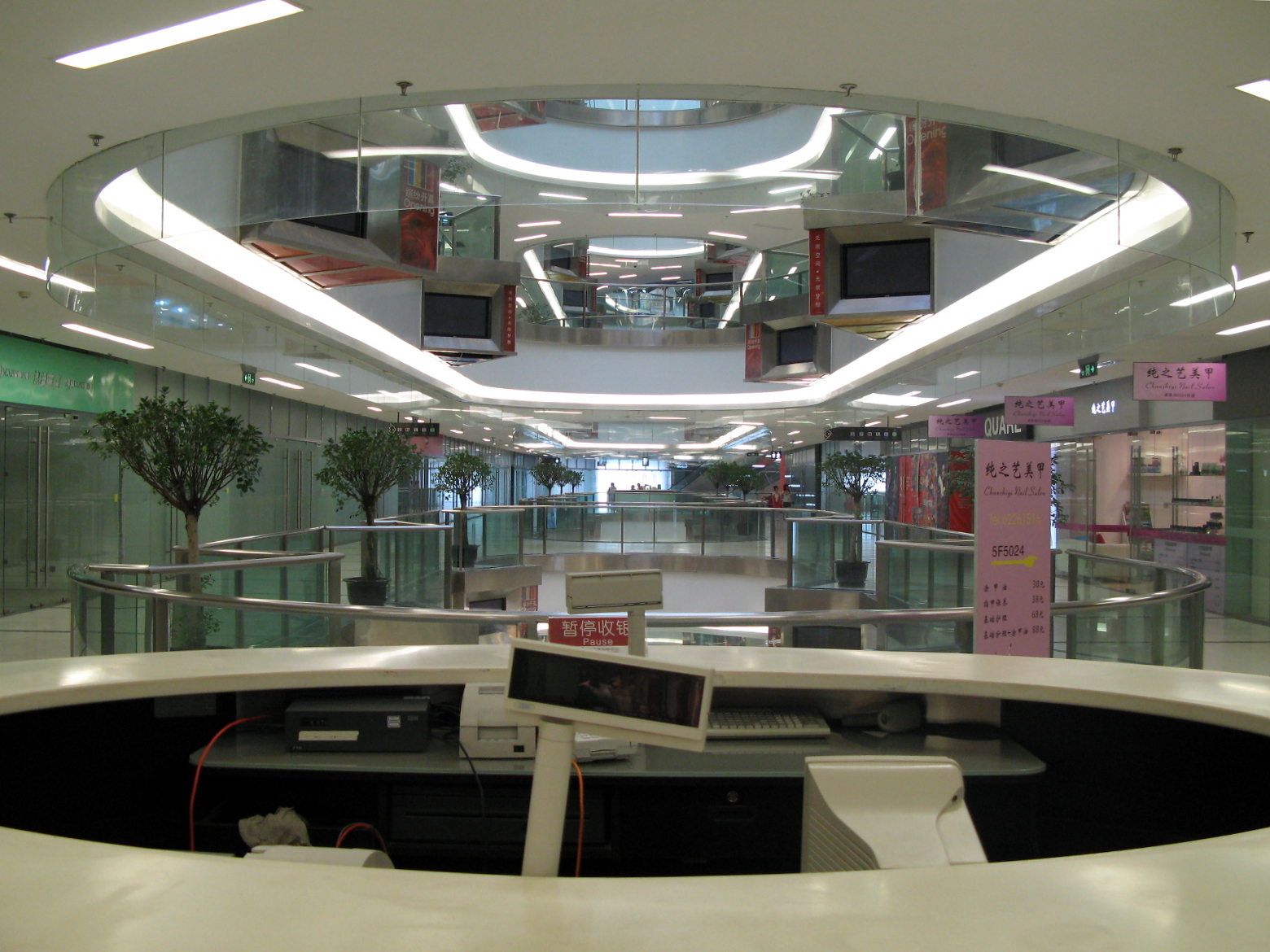
View inside the mall

Longemont (Chinese: 龙之梦, literally: 'Dragon's Dream', also known as Cloud Nine Shopping Mall or Shanghai Summit Shopping City) is a 60-floor, 238-meter (781 ft) tall skyscraper with a shopping mall at its base, and offices and Renaissance Shanghai Zhongshan Park Hotel as its main body, completed in 2006 and located in Shanghai, China.

== Overview ==
The building is primarily a shopping mall at the lower levels. The mall is home to many multinational retailers such as Uniqlo, C&A, and Zara (retailer), and is also connected to a Renaissance Shanghai Zhongshan Park Hotel. At night the skyscraper is lit by floodlights attached to the outside walls.

Longemont is located in western Shanghai, near Zhongshan Park. The park itself is just to the north and to the north of that is Suzhou Creek.

An accident with an escalator in August 2015 resulted in the amputation of a man's leg.

== Transport ==
The skyscraper is immediately northeast of the Zhongshan Park Station on Shanghai Metro Line 2, Line 3, and Line 4. It can be seen from Lines 3 and 4, which are elevated at this point.

== See also ==
- List of tallest buildings in Shanghai
- Global Harbor, another shopping mall a few kilometers to the north of Zhongshan Park.
