= Changfeng Park =

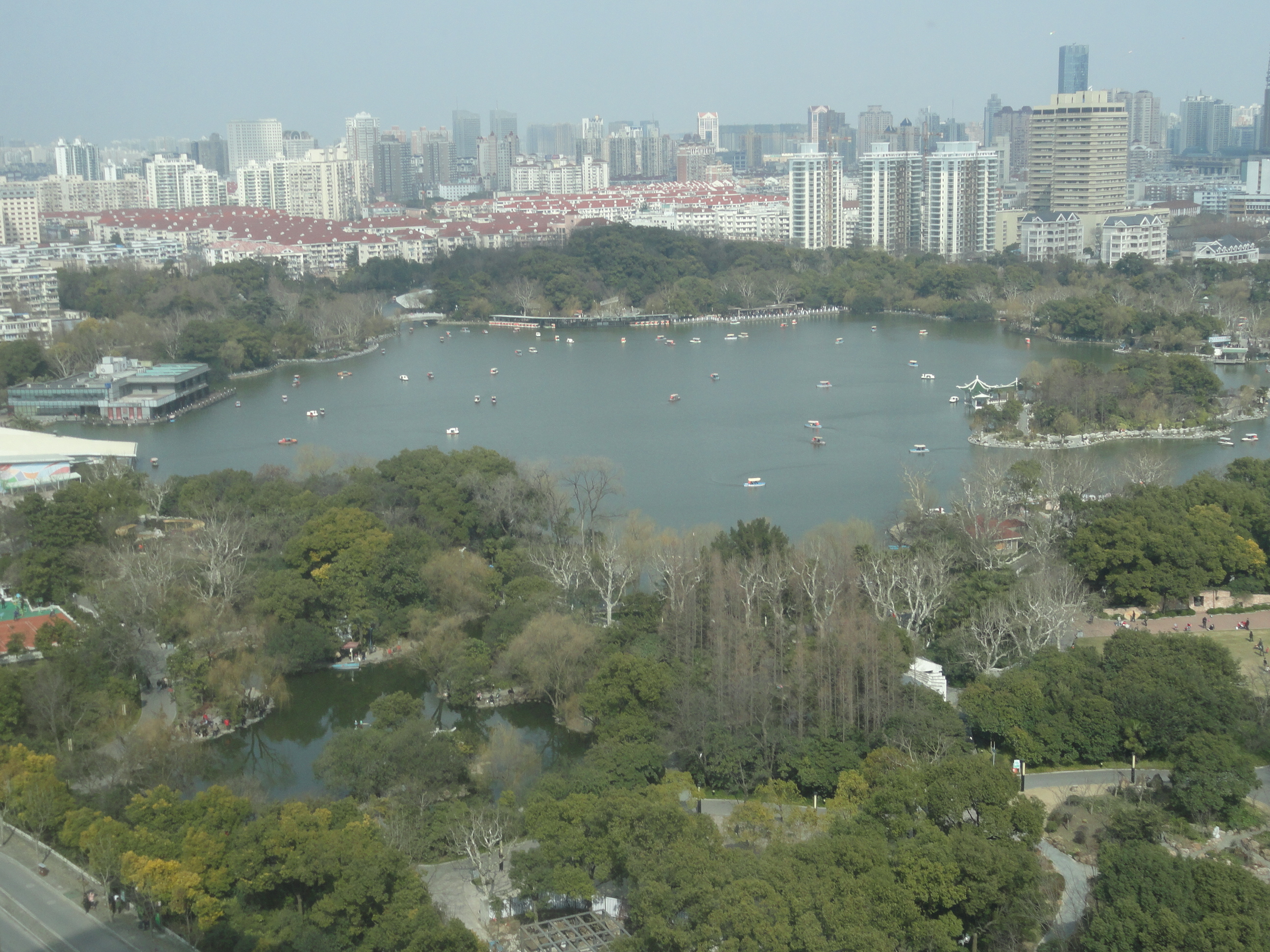
- Elevated view of Changfeng Park from the Marriott Hotel

- Location within Shanghai
- Type: Public urban park
- Location: Putuo District, Shanghai, China
- Coordinates: 31°13′36″N 121°23′41″E
- Created: 1959
- Status: Open year round

Changfeng Park
- Simplified Chinese: 长风公园
- Traditional Chinese: 長風公園
Transcriptions
Standard Mandarin
- Hanyu Pinyin: Chángfēng Gōngyuán

Changfeng Park (Chinese: 长风公园; pinyin: Chángfēng Gōngyuán; Wu Chinese pronunciation: [zɑ̃.foŋ.koŋ.yø]; literally: Park of Far Off Wind) is a landscaped park in the west of Shanghai, China. The size of the park is 364,000 square meters. It features an artificial lake, Yinchu Lake, and an artificial hill, Tiebi Hill. There are various facilities including a Sea Life aquarium, a small amusement park, and boating on the lake.

== Location ==
The park is located in the Putuo District. To the east is East China Normal University.

== History ==
The first phase of constructing the park started on 4 April 1957 and the second phase started in July 1958. The park was opened on Chinese National Day (1 October) in 1959. Initially the park was called Huxi Park ("Western Shanghai Park") and then Biluohu Park ("Green Usnea Lake Park") when it was partly opened on 1 July 1958. On 29 September 1959, the deputy secretary of the Shanghai Municipal Party Committee, Wei Wenbo, changed its name to Changfeng Park ("Park of Far Off Wind"). He also named the artificial lake and hill as Yin Chu Lake ("Gleaming Mattock Lake") and Tie Bi Hill ("Mighty Arm Hill"). Both names were adopted from a Mao Zedong poem written in 1958.

== Changfeng Ocean World (Sea Life Shanghai) ==
Changfeng Ocean World (Sea Life Shanghai)
- Interactive map of Changfeng Ocean World (Sea Life Shanghai)
- Date opened: 1999
- Location: Shanghai, China
- Website: http://www.oceanworld.com.cn

Changfeng Ocean World, also known as Sea Life Shanghai, is the main attraction within Changfeng Park. It opened in 1999 with an area of 10,000 square meters. It showcases more than 10,000 marine creatures of over 300 different varieties. It is China's first marine aquarium, and Shanghai's first large-scale world-class aquarium. There are more than 1,500 species of marine life on display, and it is one of Shanghai's youth science education bases. The main building is located 13 metres below Yin Chu Lake. The aquarium was purchased by Merlin Entertainments in 2012.

Changfeng Ocean World controversially includes a beluga whale and sea lion performance hall. Visitors can, in cooperation with the staff, wear diving suits dance in the water with the whales or sea lions. It is believed that for this reason, Changfeng Ocean World is not linked to from the main Sea Life website.

== Transportation ==
The park can be reached by taking Shanghai Metro Line 3 or Line 4 to the Jinshajiang Road Station to the northeast of the park. Shanghai Metro Line 2 runs south of the park. Shanghai Metro Line 15 can be taken directly to Changfeng Park station.

== Gallery ==
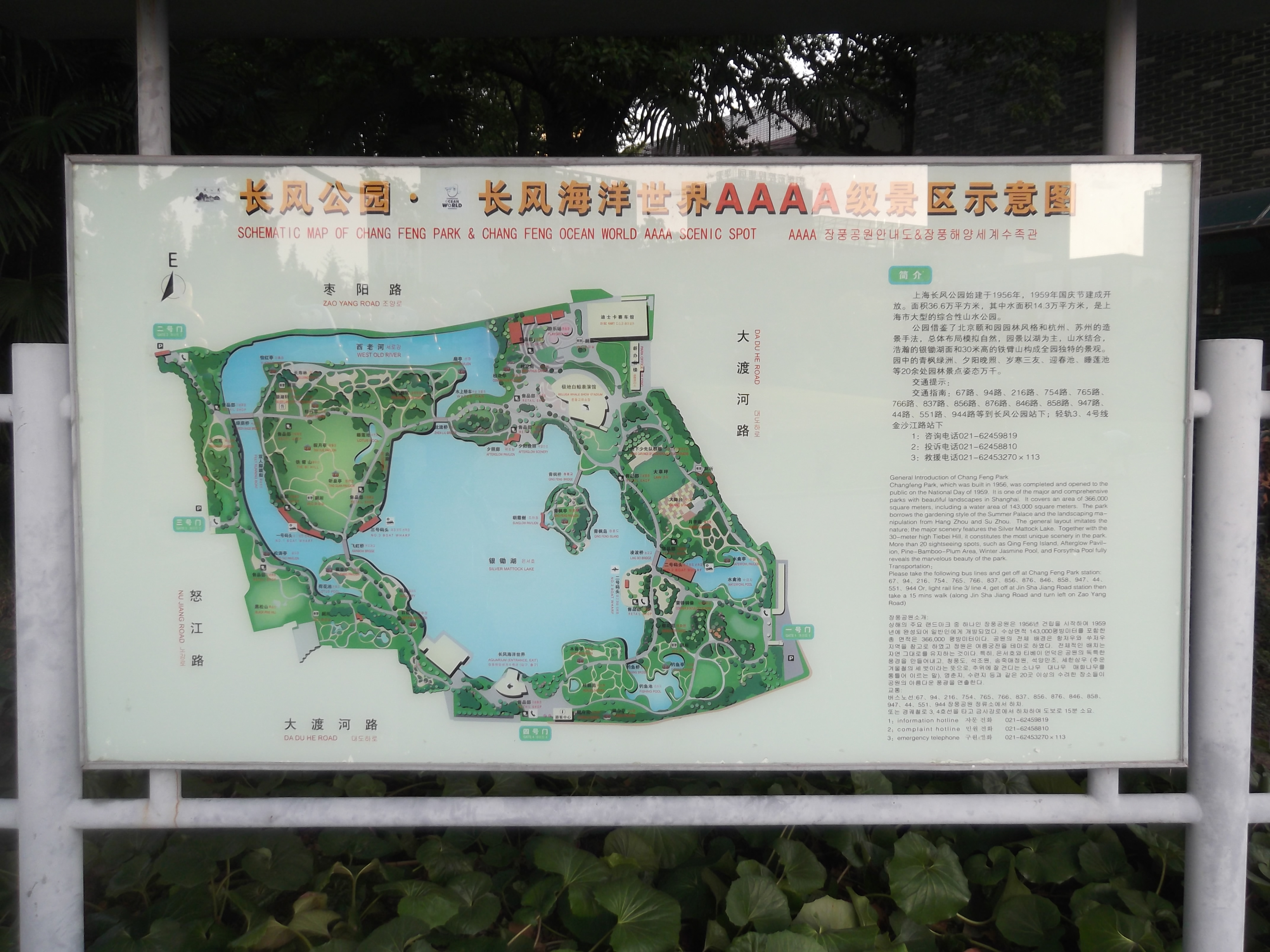
Sign with a map of Changfeng Park at an entrance to the park

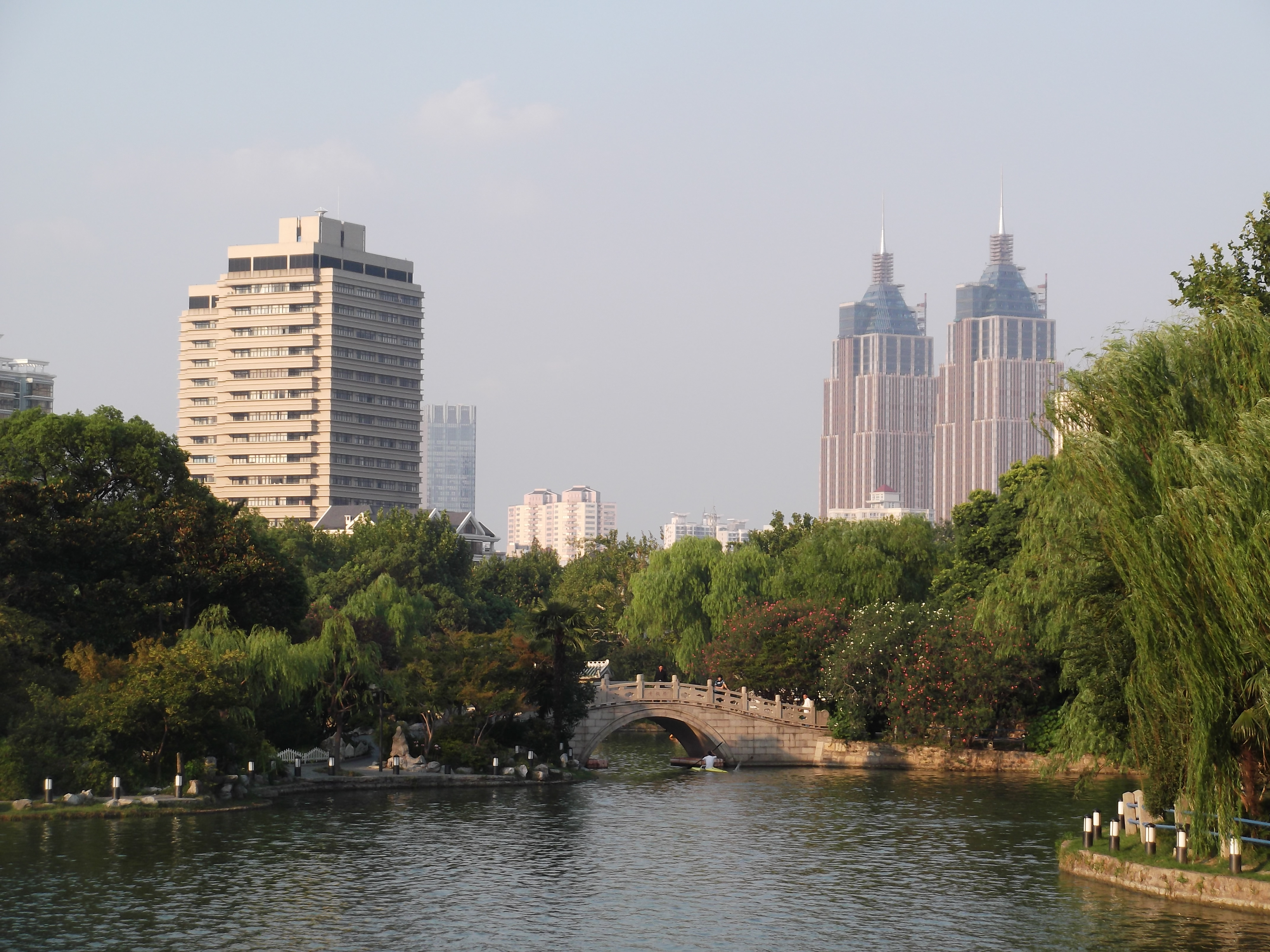
View of the boating lake in the park, with the two towers of the Global Harbor shopping mall in the distance

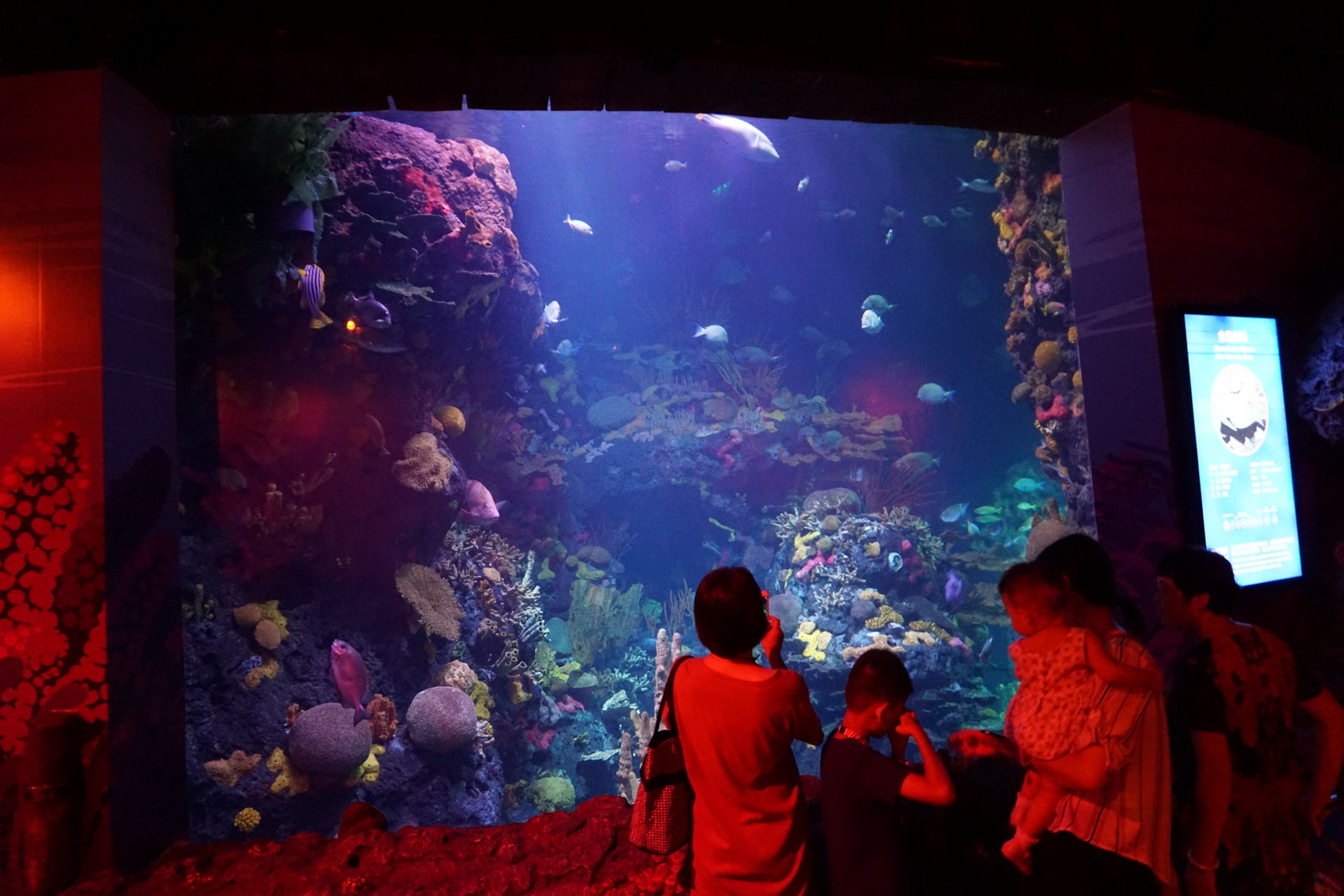
Changfeng Park aquarium

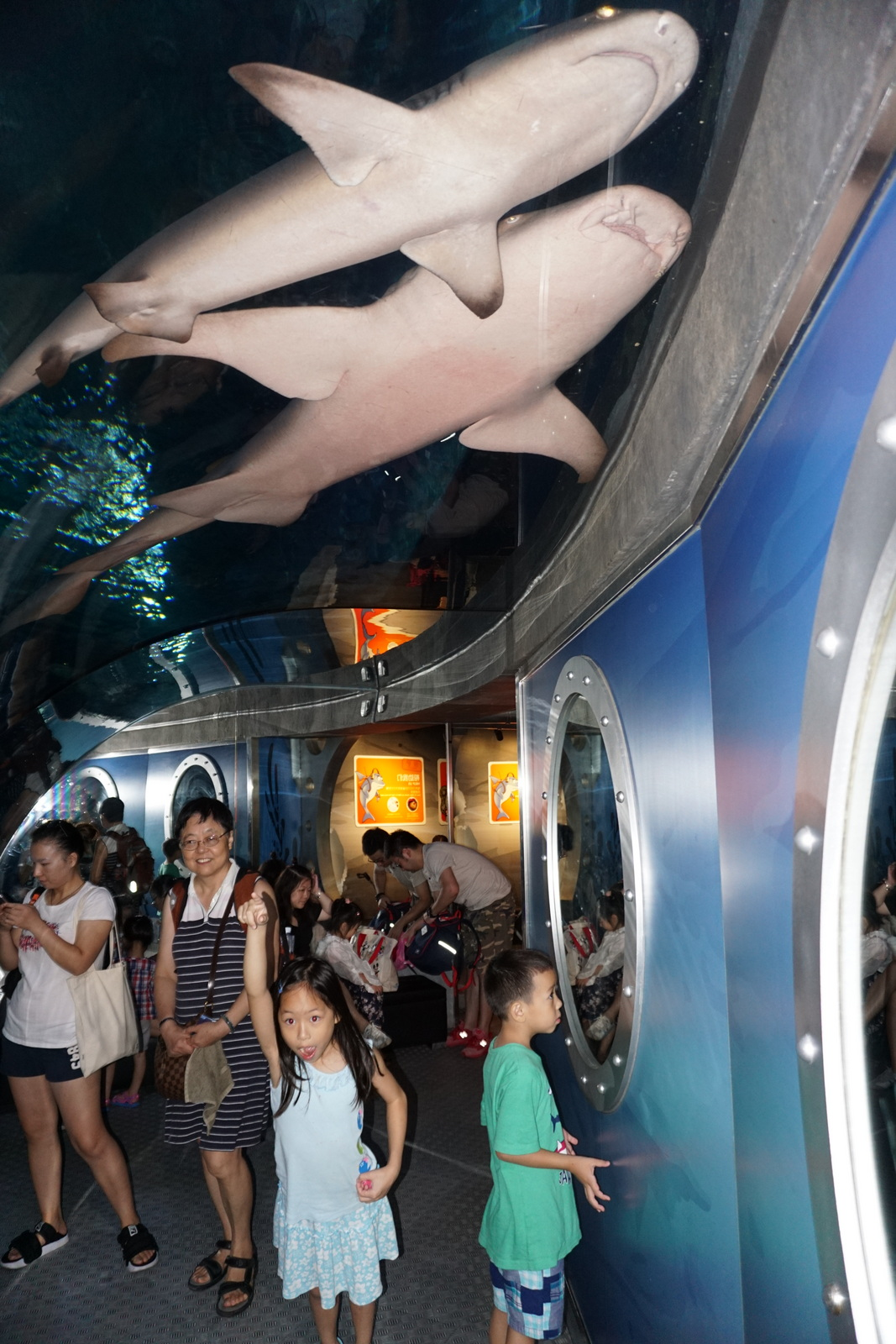
Changfeng Park aquarium walkway

== See also ==
- Zhongshan Park, to the southeast
