= Xiabu Xiabu =

Chinese hot pot restaurant chain

Xiabu Xiabu 呷哺呷哺
- Native name: 呷哺呷哺
- Type: Public
- Traded as: SEHK: 520
- Industry: Restaurant
- Founded: 1998
- Headquarters: Beijing, China
- Website: www.xiabu.com

Xiabu Xiabu Catering Management Co., Ltd.
- Simplified Chinese: 呷哺呷哺餐饮管理有限公司
- Traditional Chinese: 呷哺呷哺餐飲管理有限公司
Transcriptions
Standard Mandarin
- Hanyu Pinyin: Xiābǔ Xiābǔ Cānyǐn Guǎnlǐ Yǒuxiàngōngsī

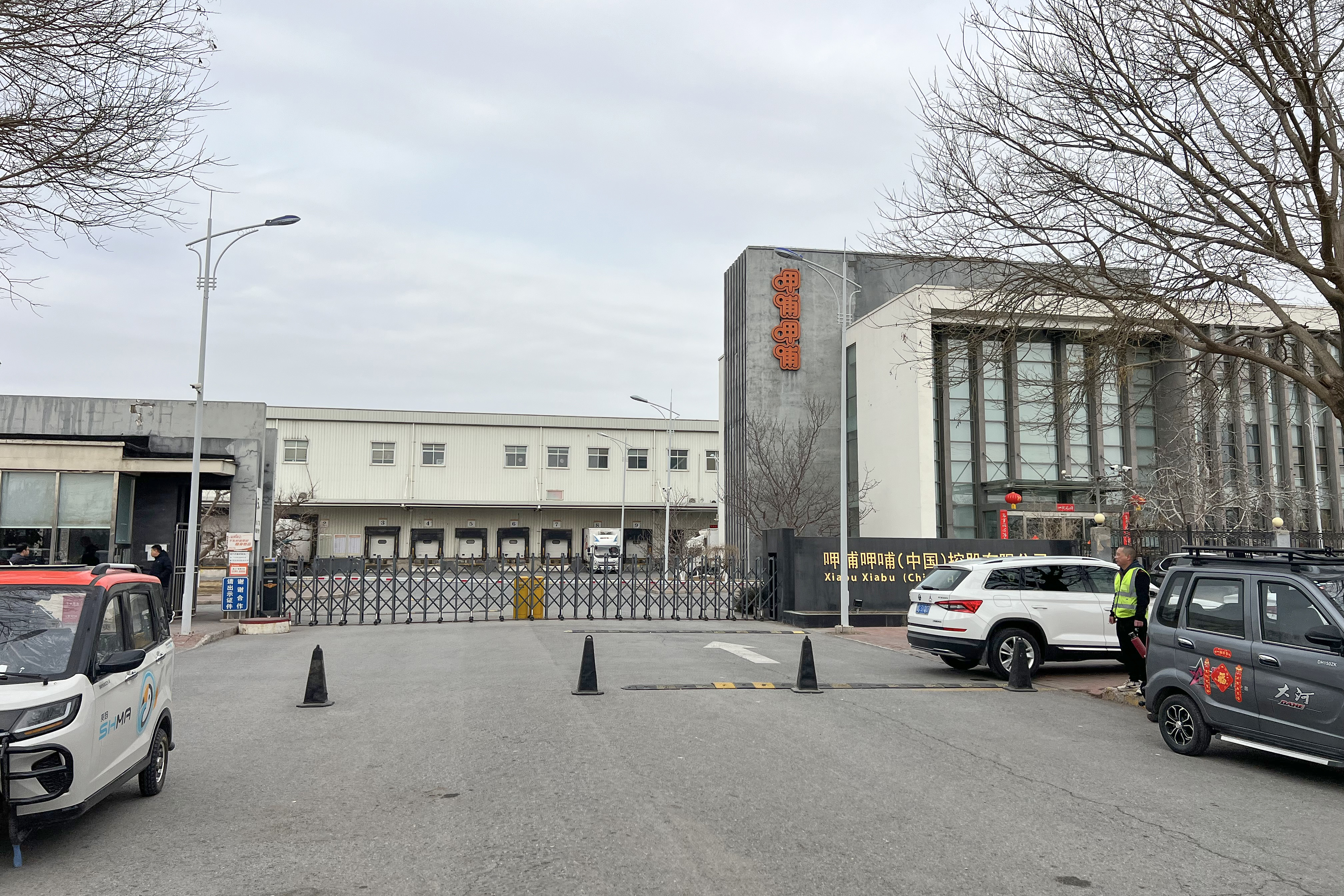
Headquarters

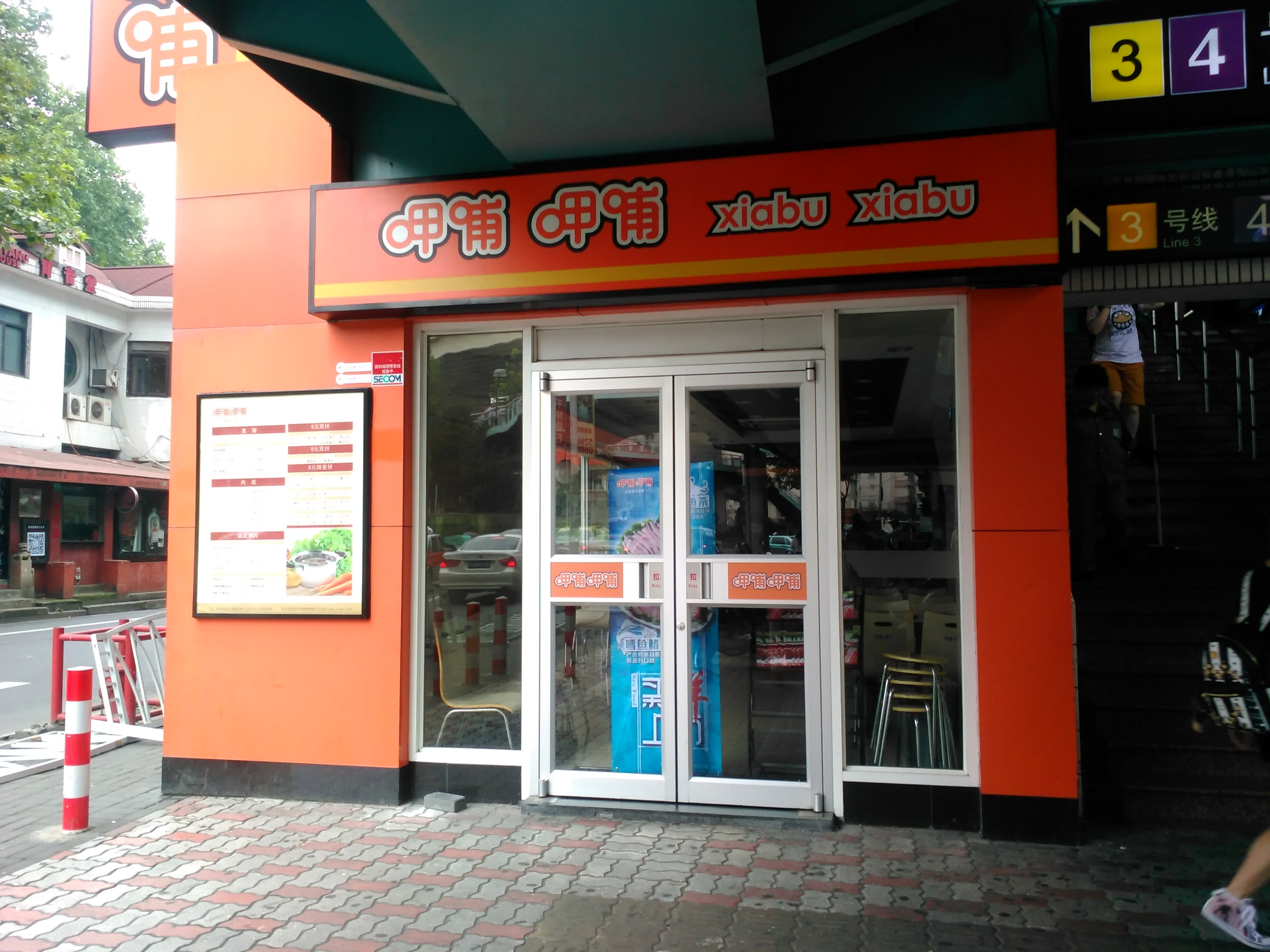
Xiabu Xiabu restaurant at West Yan'an Road Station in Shanghai

Xiabu Xiabu Catering Management Co., Ltd. or Xiabu Xiabu (Chinese: 呷哺呷哺; pinyin: Xiābǔ Xiābǔ) is a fast food hot pot restaurant chain in China. Its headquarters is in Daxing District, Beijing.

== History ==
The company was established in 1998.

As of 2008, the company used centralized kitchens, and a hot pot meal at Xiabu Xiabu cost 27 renminbi (approximately $4 U.S. dollars). By November 2008, Xiabu Xiabu operated 53 locations in Beijing, with plans to expand to 60 locations by the end of the year. That same year, Actis Capital paid $51 million U.S. dollars to acquire a majority stake of Xiabu Xiabu, stating an aim to triple the number of stores within a three-year period.

As of 2012, there were over 300 Xiabu Xiabu restaurants across Beijing, Shanghai, Tianjin, and the provinces of Hebei, Jiangsu, and Liaoning. Also in 2012, Actis sold the company to global growth equity firm General Atlantic, intending to secure $150 million from the sale.

In September 2018, the chain lost £145 million in market value after a customer found a dead rat in her soup at an outlet in Weifang.

By 2021, there were 1,077 restaurants under the Xiabu Xiabu brand and its sister brand, Coucou.
