= Zhongshan Park (Shanghai) =

Park in Shanghai, China

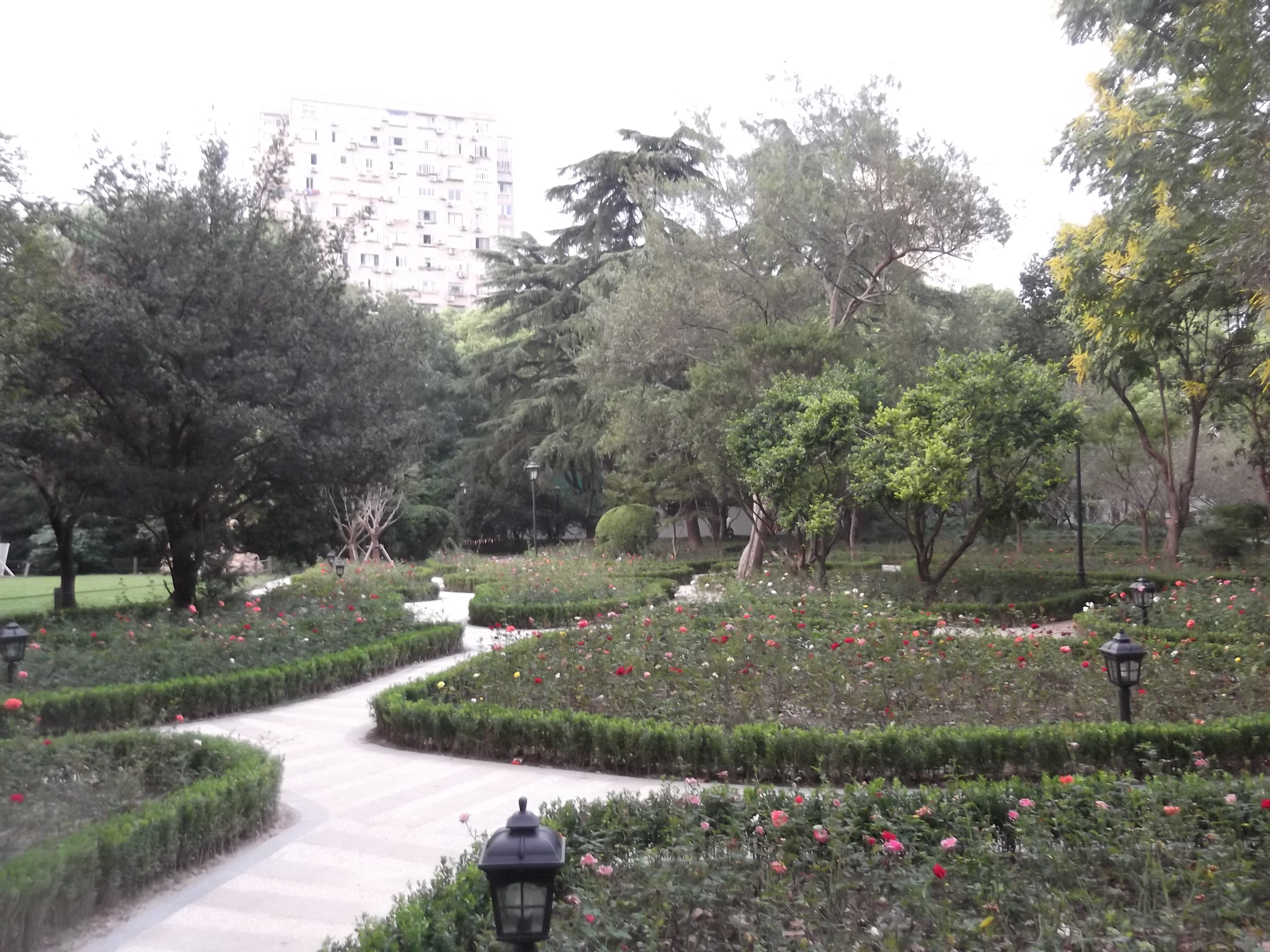
- Rose beds in Zhongshan Park

- Location within Shanghai
- Type: Public urban park
- Location: Changning District, Shanghai, China
- Coordinates: 31.2223°N 121.419°E
- Created: 1914
- Status: Open year round

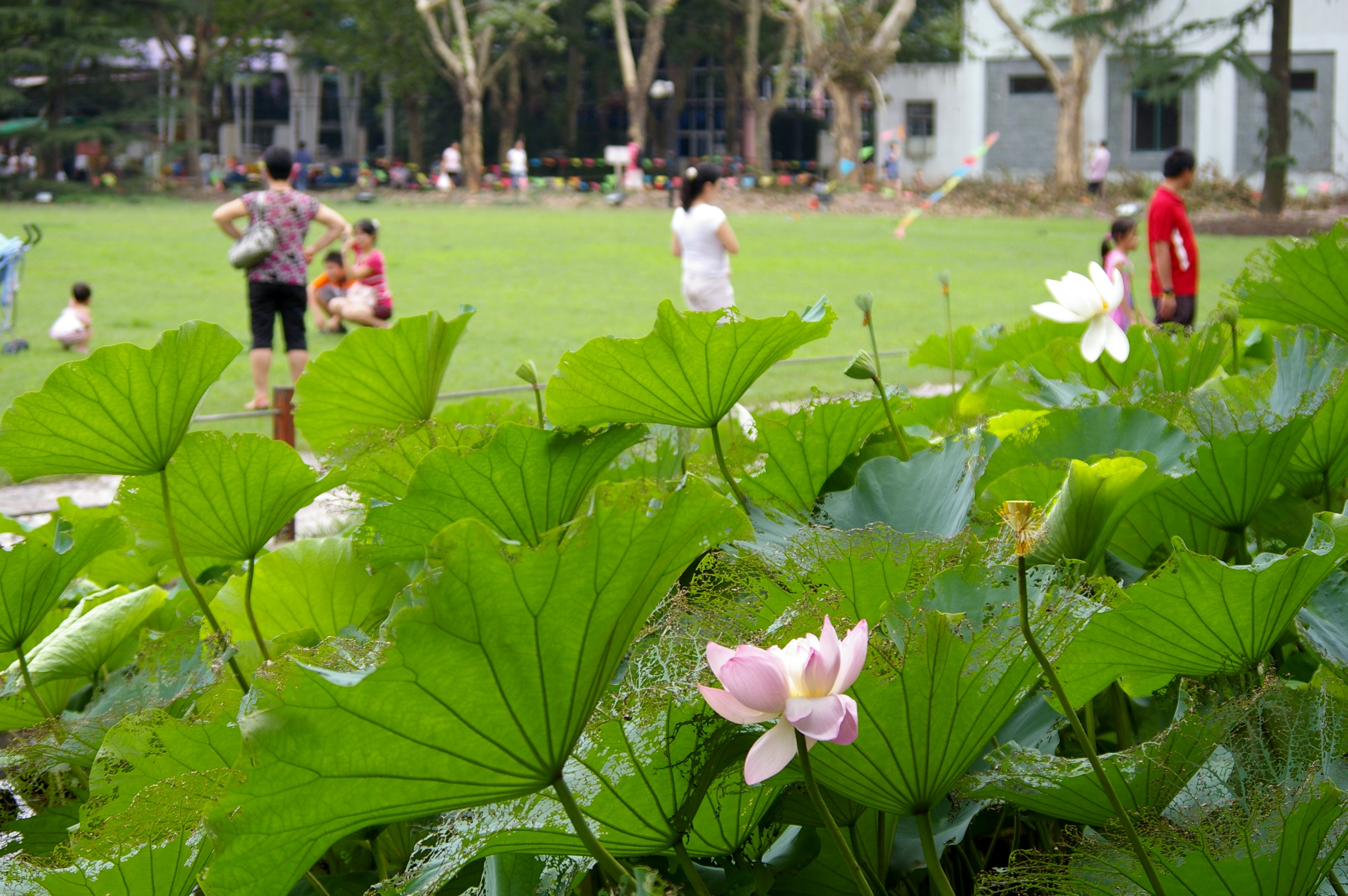
Lotus flowers in Zhongshan Park

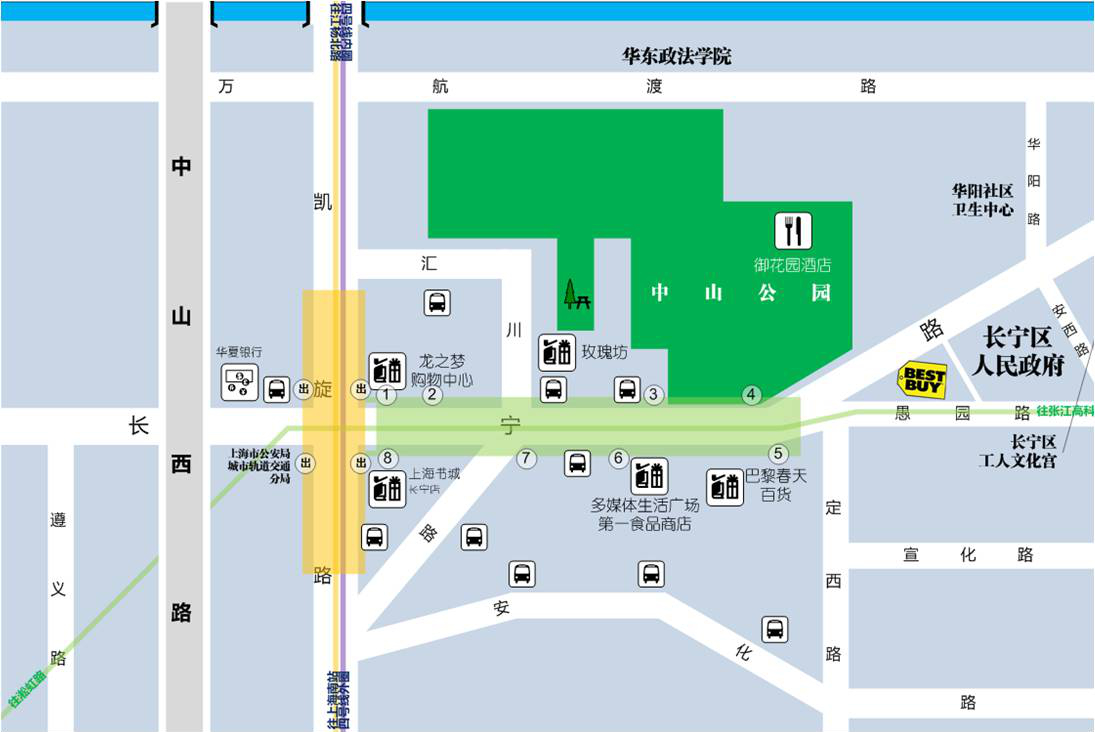
Map of Zhongshan Park (marked in green) and the surrounding area

Zhongshan Park (simplified Chinese: 中山公园; traditional Chinese: 中山公園; pinyin: Zhōngshān Gōngyuán; Shanghainese: Tsonsae Konyoe), formerly called Jessfield Park and Zhaofeng Park (Chinese: 兆豐公園), is a park in Changning District, Shanghai, China. The park has a large collection of trees and flowers. People fly kites and play sport games on the large meadow areas.

== Location ==
The park is located centrally in the Changning District. To the north is Suzhou Creek and the East China University of Politics and Law. There is a large shopping mall with a tall skyscraper above, Cloud Nine, southwest of the park.

== History ==
Zhongshan Park was established in 1914 by the Shanghai Municipal Council as Jessfield Park (極司非爾花園), after Jessfield Road (now Wanhangdu Road) which led to the park. The park was in the extra-settlement roads area beyond the formal boundaries of the Shanghai International Settlement but was administered by the Settlement's authority, the Shanghai Municipal Council.

Before the property became a public park, it was the southern half of a private garden owned by H. Fogg, a British property developer. The northern half of Hogg's property was sold to the Episcopal Church to build St John's University. Thus, the park was also popularly known as "Zhaofeng Garden" (兆豐花園), after the Chinese name of Hogg's firm Jenner Hogg & Co. It was renamed "Zhongshan Park" in honor of Dr. Sun Yat-sen in 1944.

== Transportation ==
The park can be reached via the Shanghai Metro Line 2, Line 3 or Line 4 to Zhongshan Park Station. It is northwest of the station, with an entrance south of Suzhou Creek.

== See also ==
- Changfeng Park, to the northwest
- Cloud Nine shopping mall, to the southwest
- Suzhou Creek, to the north
- Zhongshan Park (Shanghai Metro), to the southwest
