= West Nanjing Road station =

Shanghai Metro interchange station

West Nanjing Road 南京西路
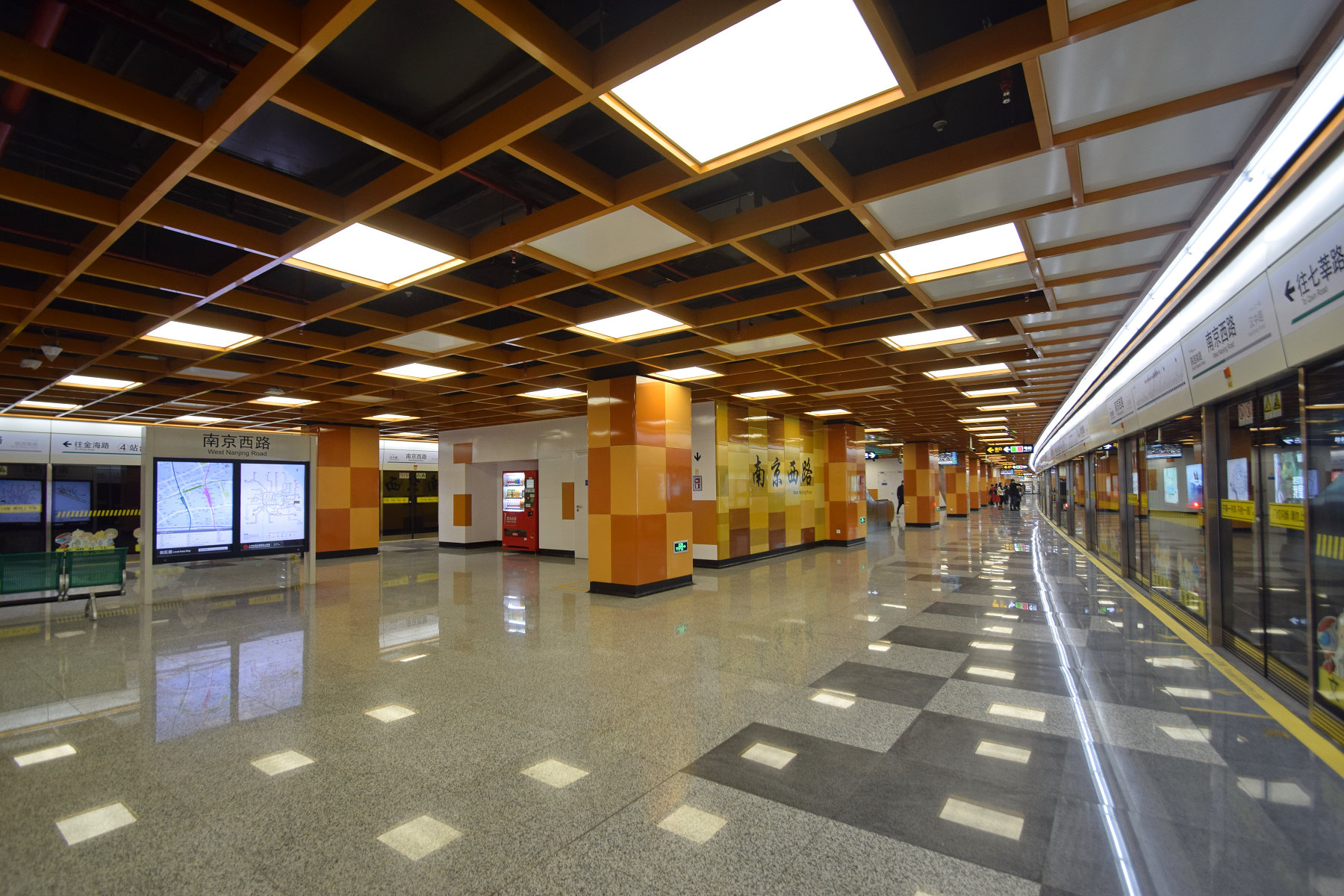
- Line 12 platform

General information
- Location: West Nanjing Road and Shimen No. 1 Road; Jing'an District, Shanghai; China
- Coordinates: 31°13′47″N 121°27′36″E
- Operator: Shanghai No. 2/4 Metro Operation Co. Ltd.
- Lines: Line 2; Line 12; Line 13
- Platforms: 6 (2 island platforms for Lines 2 & 12 and 2 side platforms for Line 13)
- Tracks: 6

Construction
- Structure type: Underground
- Accessible: Yes

Other information
- Station code: L02/20 (Line 2)

History
- Opened: 20 September 1999 (Line 2); 19 December 2015 (Lines 12 and 13)
- Former names: Shimen No. 1 Road (up to 28 October 2006)

Services
Preceding station	Shanghai Metro	Following station
Jing'an Temple towards Panxiang Road · Shanghai National Accounting Institute	Line 2	People's Square towards Pudong Airport Terminal 1&2
South Shaanxi Road towards Qixin Road	Line 12	Hanzhong Road towards Jinhai Road
Shanghai Natural History Museum towards Jinyun Road	Line 13	Middle Huaihai Road towards Zhangjiang Road
Location
- Location within Shanghai

West Nanjing Road Station (Chinese: 南京西路; pinyin: Nánjīng Xī Lù) is a virtual interchange station between Lines 2, 12 and 13 of the Shanghai Metro, located along one of Shanghai's main commercial streets, with a number of international flagship stores situated nearby. This station, known as Shimen No. 1 Road station (simplified Chinese: 石门一路; traditional Chinese: 石門一路; pinyin: Shímén Yī Lù) before October 2006, is part of the initial section of Line 2 that opened from Zhongshan Park to Longyang Road that opened on 20 September 1999. The station changed into its current name in October 2006 according to the new convention to name metro stations after famous streets or sights nearby rather than the vertical street neighbouring the station, making it easier for visitors to find these places.

The connection with lines 12 and 13 opened on 19 December 2015. At present it is a virtual interchange station meaning passengers need to exit the station to transfer to other lines and only those with 1- or 3-day passes or Shanghai Public Transport Cards (SPTC) are not charged for such transfers, provided SPTC users transfer within 30 minutes. The station is planned to become a physical interchange station in the upcoming years.

== Places Nearby ==
- Nanjing Road (W.) shopping street
- Shanghai Natural History Museum
- Jing An Sculpture Park
- Taixing Road Zhang's Garden
- Shanghai Centre
