= Shanghai Natural History Museum station =

Shanghai Metro station

Shanghai Natural History Museum 自然博物馆
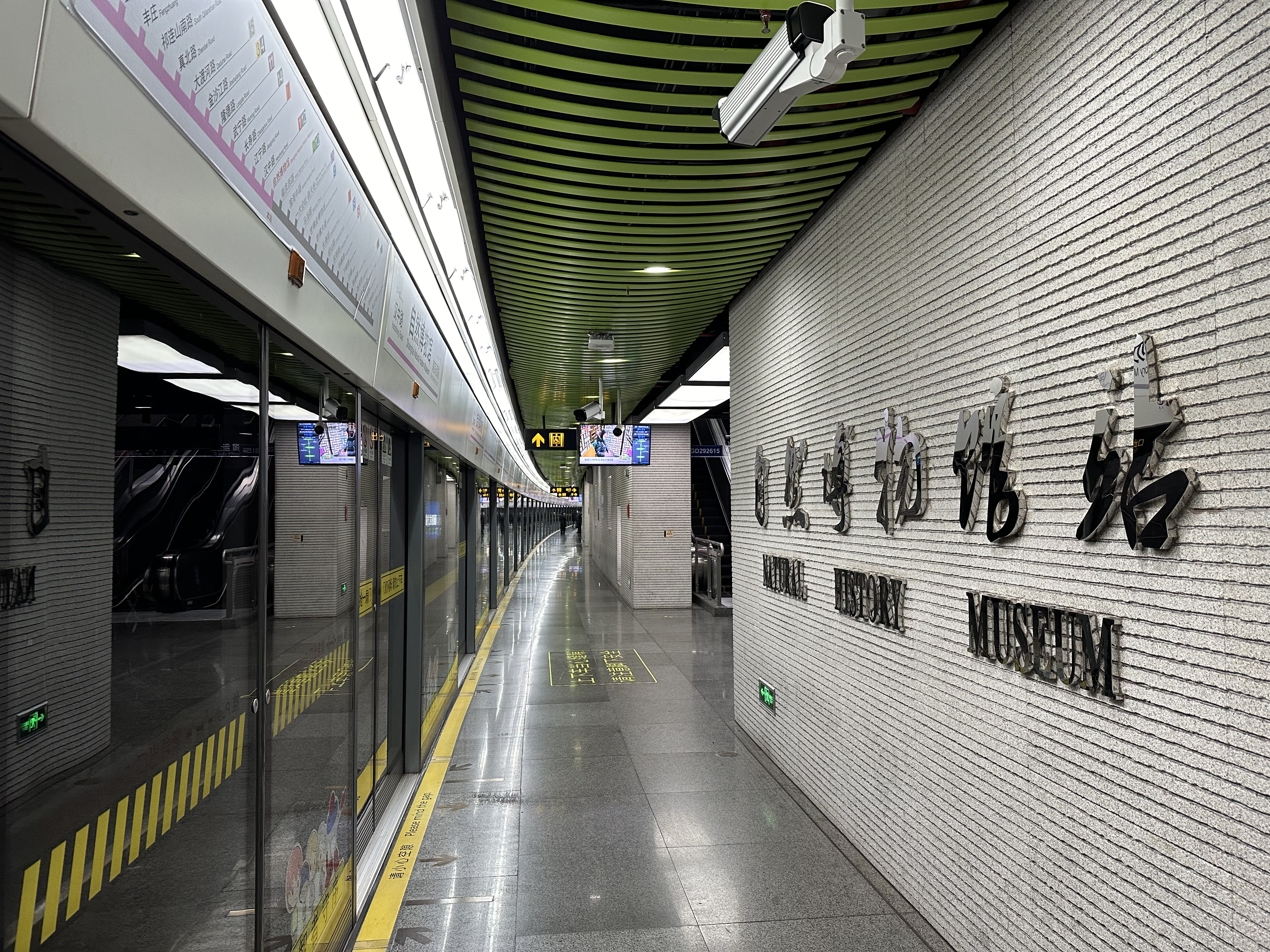
- Station platform

General information
- Location: Datian Road (大田路) and Shanhaiguan Road (山海关路); Jing'an District, Shanghai; China
- Coordinates: 31°14′18″N 121°27′28″E
- Line: Line 13
- Platforms: 2 (1 island platform)
- Tracks: 2

Construction
- Structure type: Underground
- Accessible: Yes

History
- Opened: December 19, 2015

Services
| Preceding station | Shanghai Metro | Following station |
|---|---|---|
| Hanzhong Road towards Jinyun Road | Line 13 | West Nanjing Road towards Zhangjiang Road |
Location

Shanghai Natural History Museum (simplified Chinese: 自然博物馆; traditional Chinese: 自然博物館; pinyin: Zìrán Bówùguǎn) is a station on the Shanghai Metro, which services Line 13 and opened on December 19, 2015. The station is located near the Shanghai Natural History Museum.
