= Changshou Road station =

Shanghai Metro interchange station

Changshou Road 长寿路
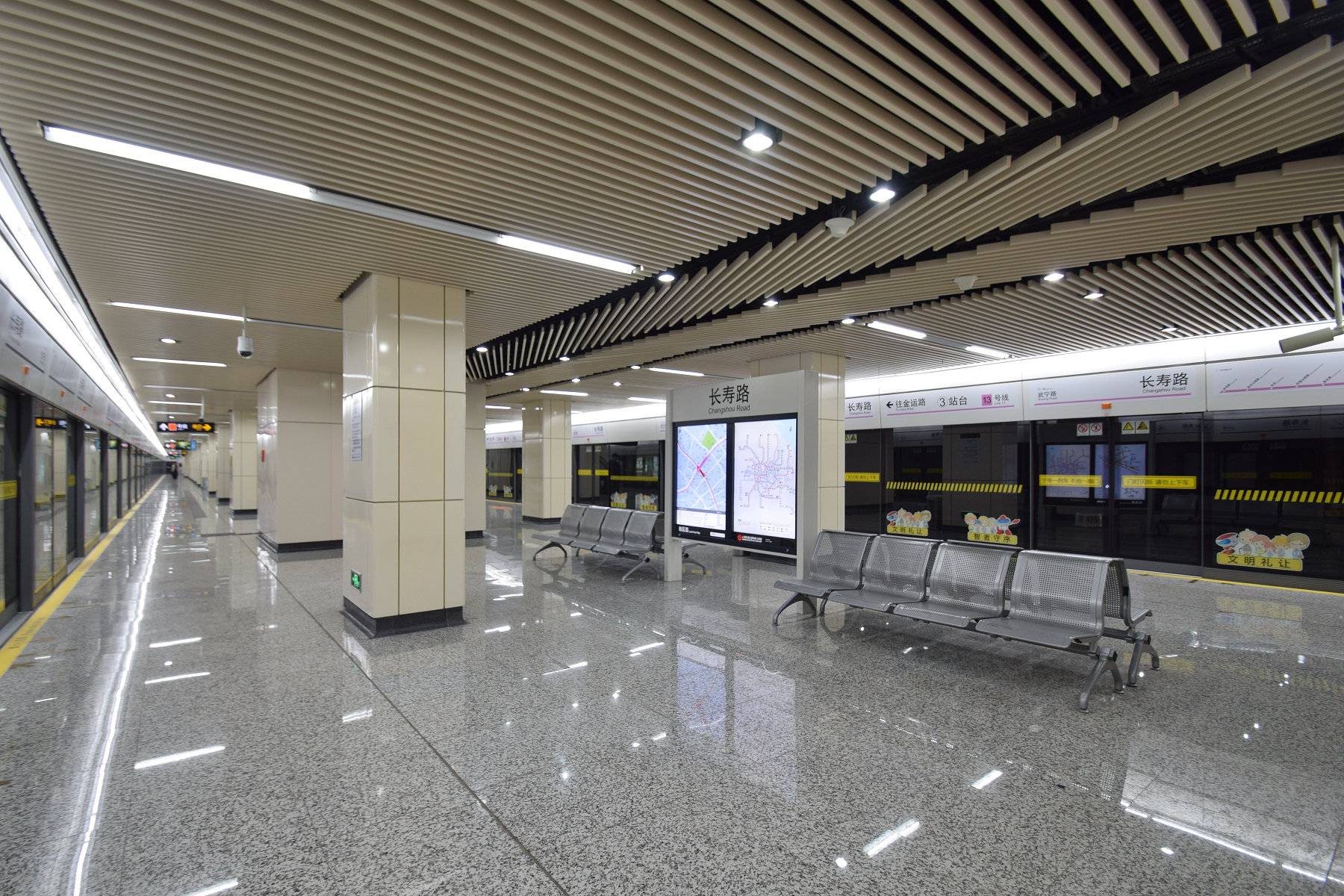
- Line 13 platform

General information
- Location: Changde Road (常德路) and Changshou Road; Putuo District, Shanghai; China
- Coordinates: 31°14′31″N 121°26′00″E
- Lines: Line 7; Line 13
- Platforms: 4 (2 island platforms)
- Tracks: 4

Construction
- Structure type: Underground
- Accessible: Yes

History
- Opened: 5 December 2009 (Line 7); 28 December 2014 (Line 13)

Services
Preceding station	Shanghai Metro	Following station
Zhenping Road towards Meilan Lake	Line 7	Changping Road towards Huamu Road
Wuning Road towards Jinyun Road	Line 13	Jiangning Road towards Zhangjiang Road
Location

Changshou Road (simplified Chinese: 长寿路; traditional Chinese: 長壽路; pinyin: Chángshòu Lù) is an interchange station on Line 7 and Line 13 of the Shanghai Metro, located in Putuo District. It opened in 2009. In December 2014, the station became a transfer station when the first extension of Line 13 opened. There are five exits located on the Changshou Road and Changde Road intersection. The station serves the southern central Putuo District and bordering Jing'an District. The station also served as the eastern terminus of Line 13 from 28 December 2014, when it was extended eastward from Jinshajiang Road, until 19 December 2015, when it was extended to Shibo Avenue.

== Station Layout ==
G	Entrances and Exits	Exits 1-7
B1	Line 1 Concourse	Faregates, Station Agent
B1	Line 7 Concourse	Faregates, Station Agent
B2	Westbound	← Line 13 towards Jinyun Road (Wuning Road)
B2	Island platform, doors open on the left
B2	Eastbound	Line 13 towards Zhangjiang Road (Jiangning Road) →
B3	Northbound	← Line 7 towards Meilan Lake (Zhenping Road)
B3	Island platform, doors open on the left
B3	Southbound	Line 7 towards Huamu Road (Changping Road) →

== Around the station ==
- Huxi Mosque
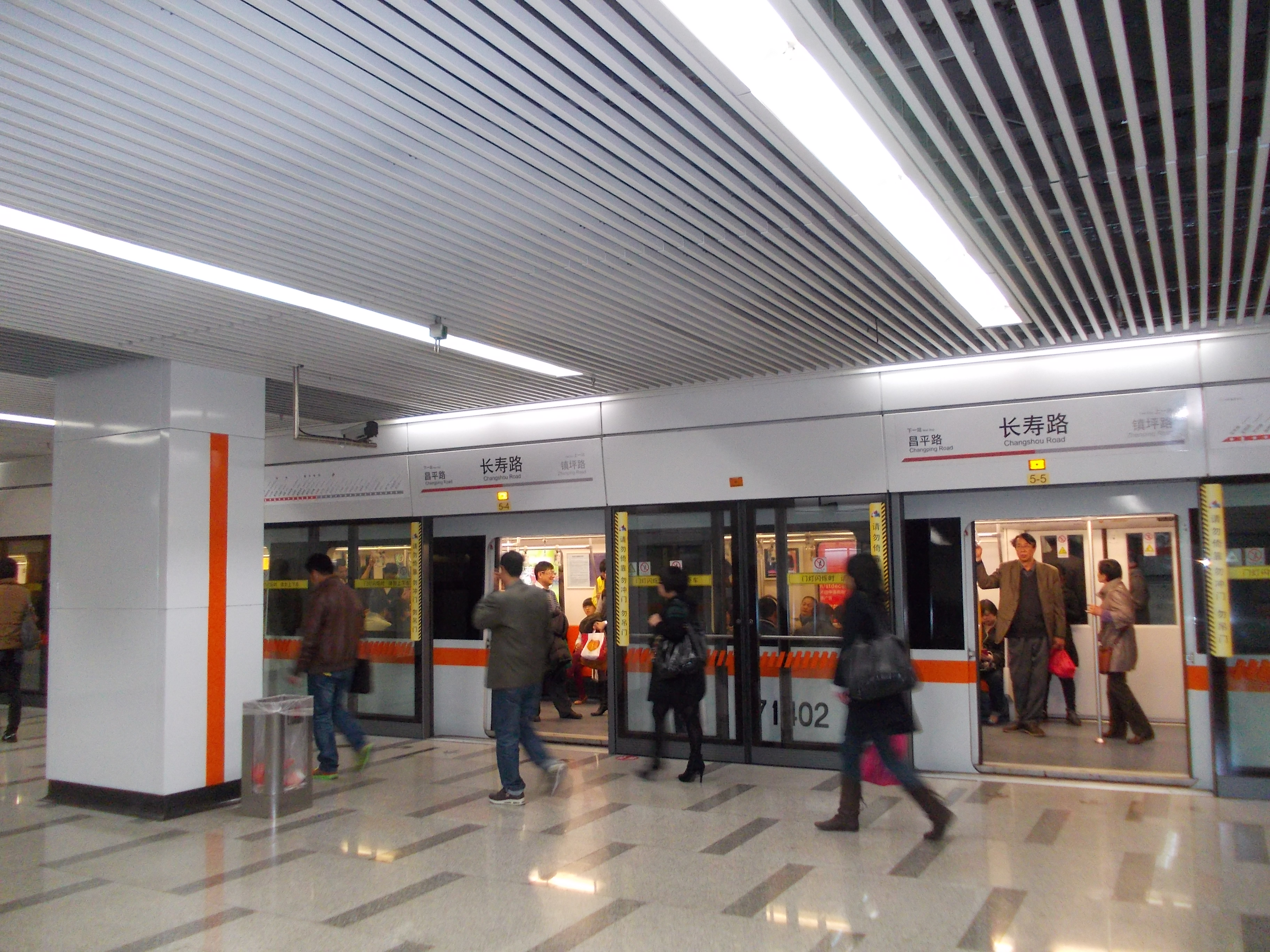
Line 7 Platform

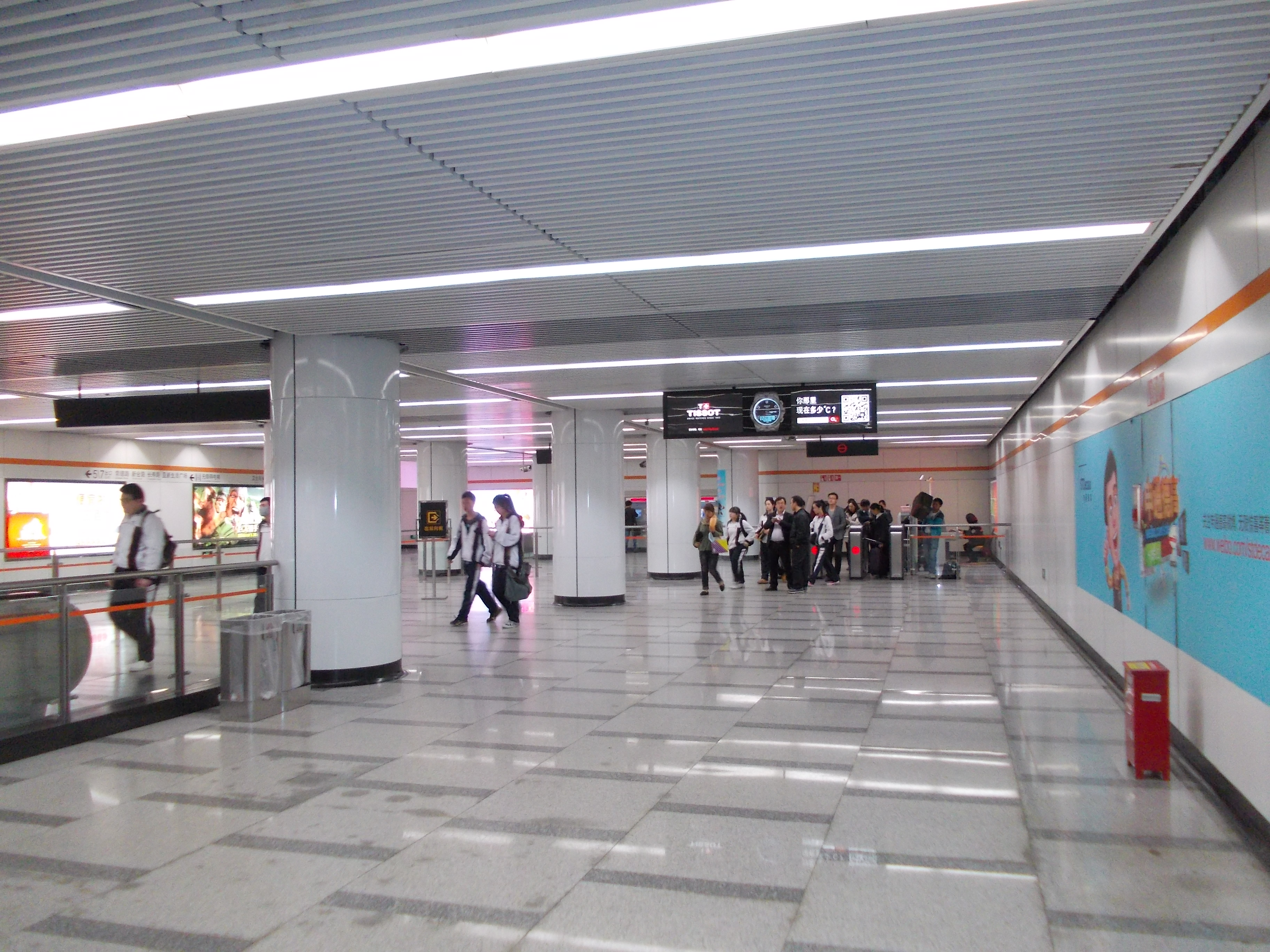
Line 7 Concourse

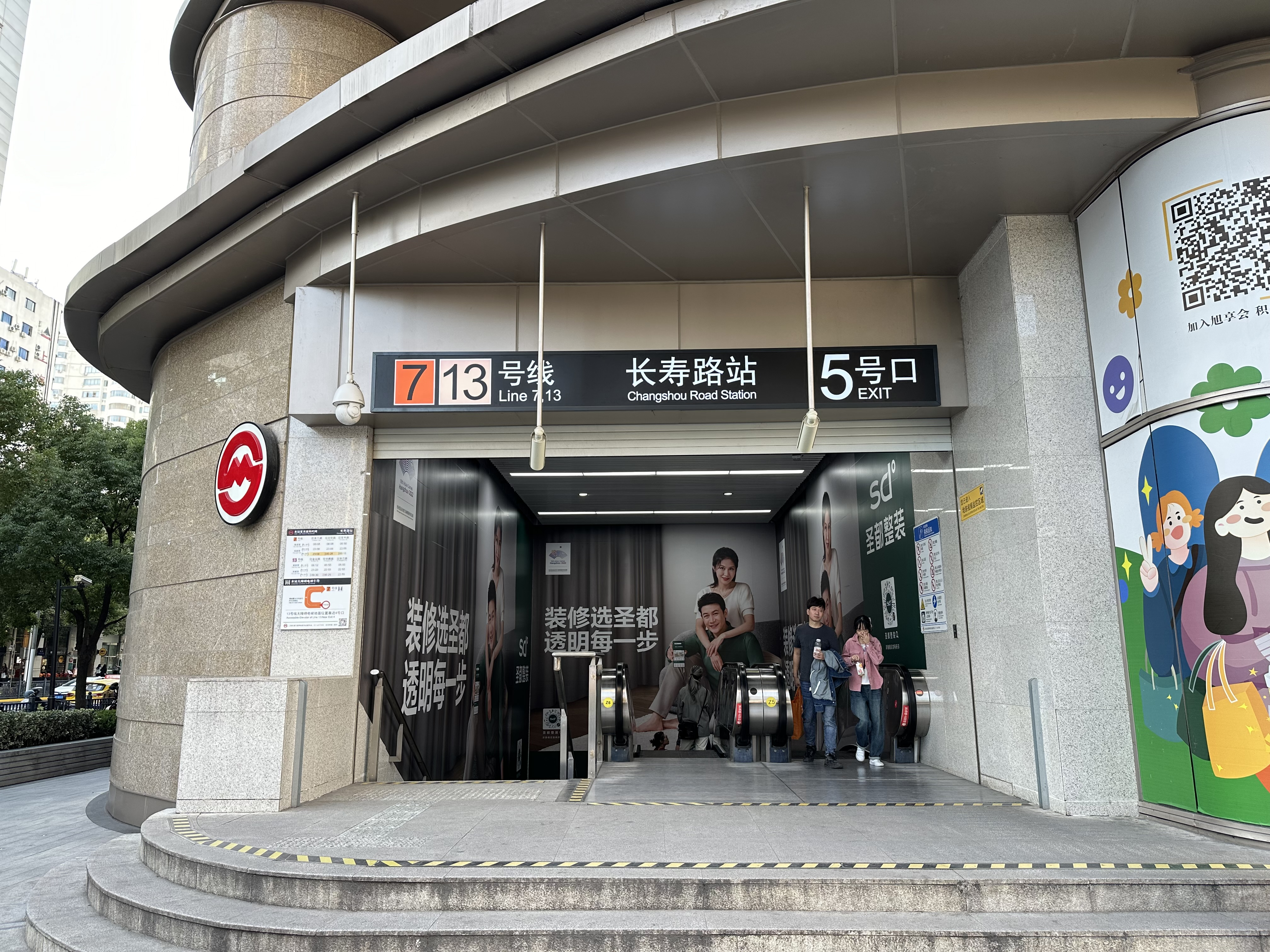
Exit 5 - located on the corners of Kangding Road and Changde Road.
