= Changping Road station =

Shanghai Metro station

Changping Road 昌平路
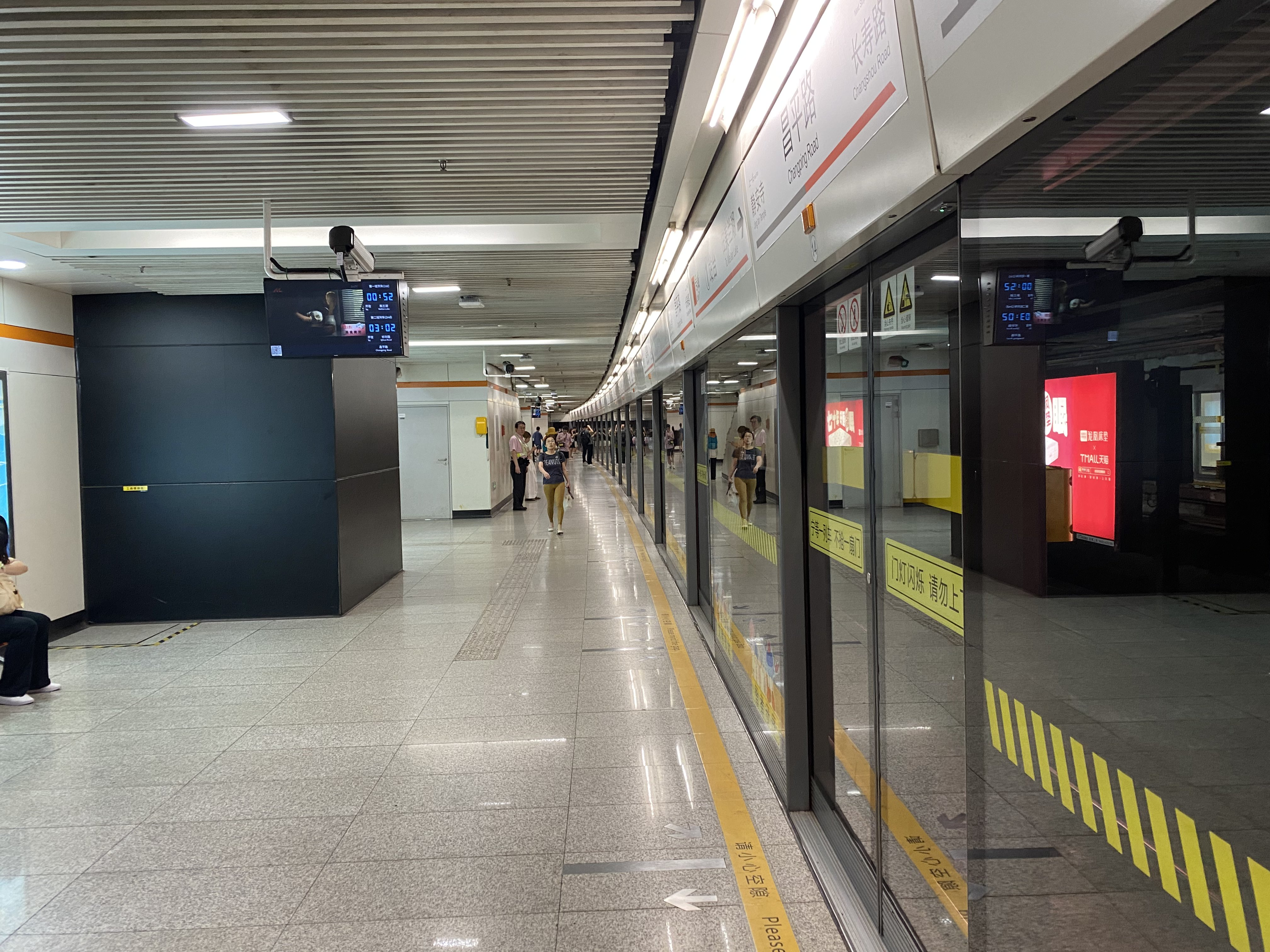
- Station platform

General information
- Location: Shanghai; China
- Coordinates: 31°14′11″N 121°26′14″E
- Operator: Shanghai No. 3 Metro Operation Co., Ltd.
- Line: Line 7
- Platforms: 2 (2 side platforms)
- Tracks: 2

Construction
- Structure type: Underground
- Accessible: Yes

History
- Opened: December 5, 2009

Services
Preceding station	Shanghai Metro	Following station
Changshou Road towards Meilan Lake	Line 7	Jing'an Temple towards Huamu Road
Location

Changping Road (Chinese: 昌平路; pinyin: Chāngpíng Lù) is a station on Line 7 of the Shanghai Metro. It is situated within the inner ring-road in Jing'an District. It began operation in December 2009, together with the other stations on the line. The station has a side platform layout.

Adjacent stations are: Jing'an Temple station, and Changshou Road station.
