= Hanzhong Road station =

Shanghai Metro interchange station

Hanzhong Road 汉中路
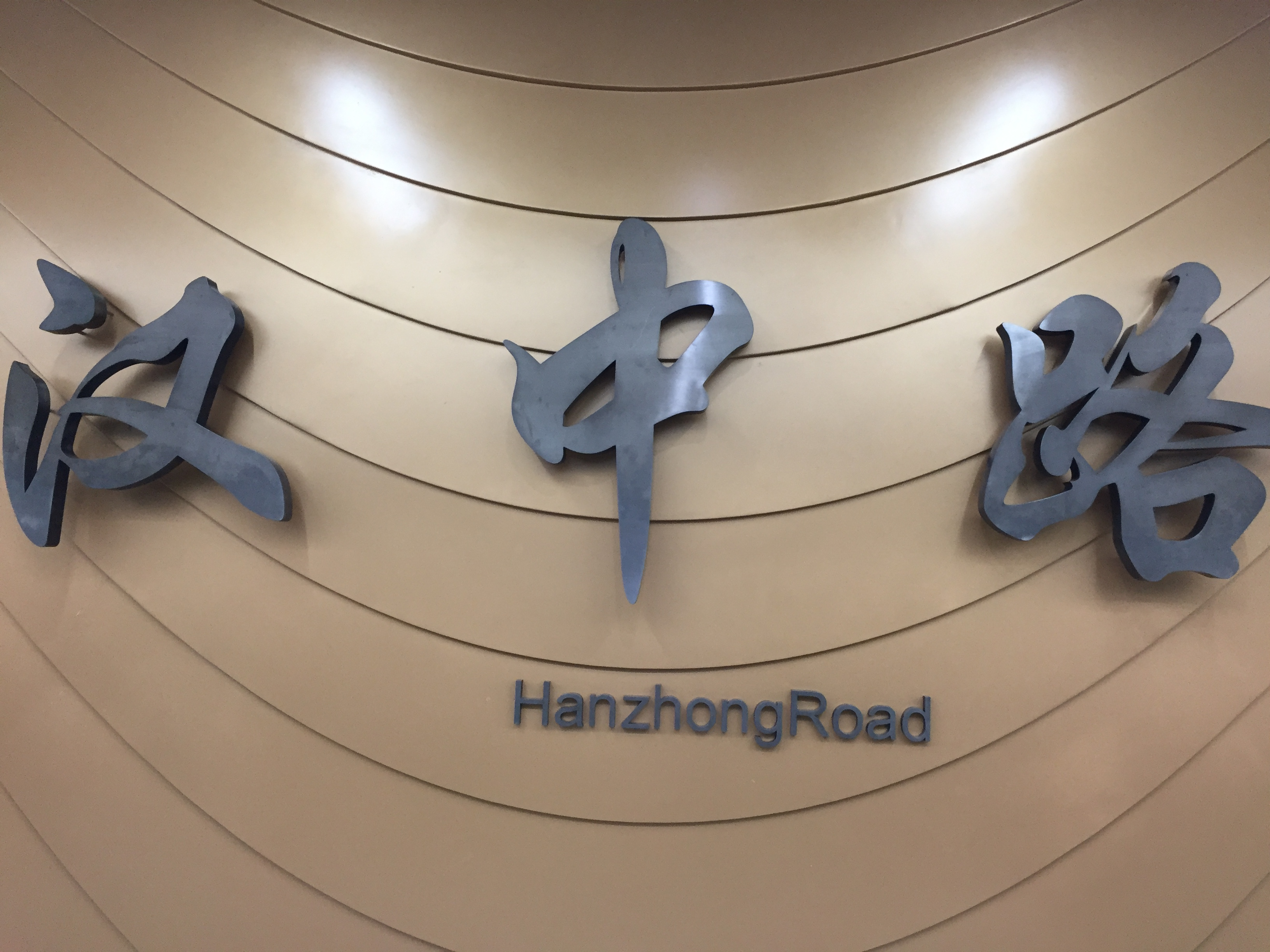

General information
- Location: Hengfeng Road (恒丰路) and Hanzhong Road (汉中路); Jing'an District, Shanghai; China
- Coordinates: 31°14′31″N 121°27′31″E
- Operator: Shanghai No.1 Metro Operation Co. Ltd.
- Lines: Line 1; Line 12; Line 13
- Platforms: 6 (3 island platforms)
- Tracks: 6

Construction
- Structure type: Underground
- Accessible: Yes

Other information
- Station code: L01/15

History
- Opened: 10 April 1995 (Line 1); 19 December 2015 (Lines 12 and 13)

Services
Preceding station	Shanghai Metro	Following station
Shanghai Railway Station towards Fujin Road	Line 1	Xinzha Road towards Xinzhuang
West Nanjing Road towards Qixin Road	Line 12	Qufu Road towards Jinhai Road
Jiangning Road towards Jinyun Road	Line 13	Shanghai Natural History Museum towards Zhangjiang Road
Location
- Location within Shanghai

Hanzhong Road (Chinese: 汉中路; pinyin: Hànzhōng Lù) is an interchange station between Line 1, Line 12, and Line 13 of the Shanghai Metro, located in Jing'an District north of Suzhou Creek within the inner ring-road of Shanghai. It opened on 10 April 1995 as part of the section between Jinjiang Park and Shanghai Railway Station. On 19 December 2015, the interchange with Lines 12 and 13 opened. In February 2016 computerized light butterflies were added, and the government is also experimenting with videos on pillars.

== Station Layout ==
G	Entrances and Exits	Exits 1-10
B1	Line 1 Concourse	Faregates, Station Agent
B2	Line 12 Concourse	Faregates, Station Agent
B2	Line 13 Concourse	Faregates, Station Agent
B2	Northbound	← Line 1 towards Fujin Road (Shanghai Railway Station)
B2	Island platform, doors open on the left
B2	Southbound	Line 1 towards Xinzhuang (Xinzha Road) →
B3	Westbound	← Line 12 towards Qixin Road (West Nanjing Road)
B3	Island platform, doors open on the left
B3	Eastbound	Line 12 towards Jinhai Road (Qufu Road) →
B4	Equipment	No access to passengers
B5	Westbound	← Line 13 towards Jinyun Road (Jiangning Road)
B5	Island platform, doors open on the left
B5	Eastbound	Line 13 towards Zhangjiang Road (Shanghai Natural History Museum) →

== Gallery ==
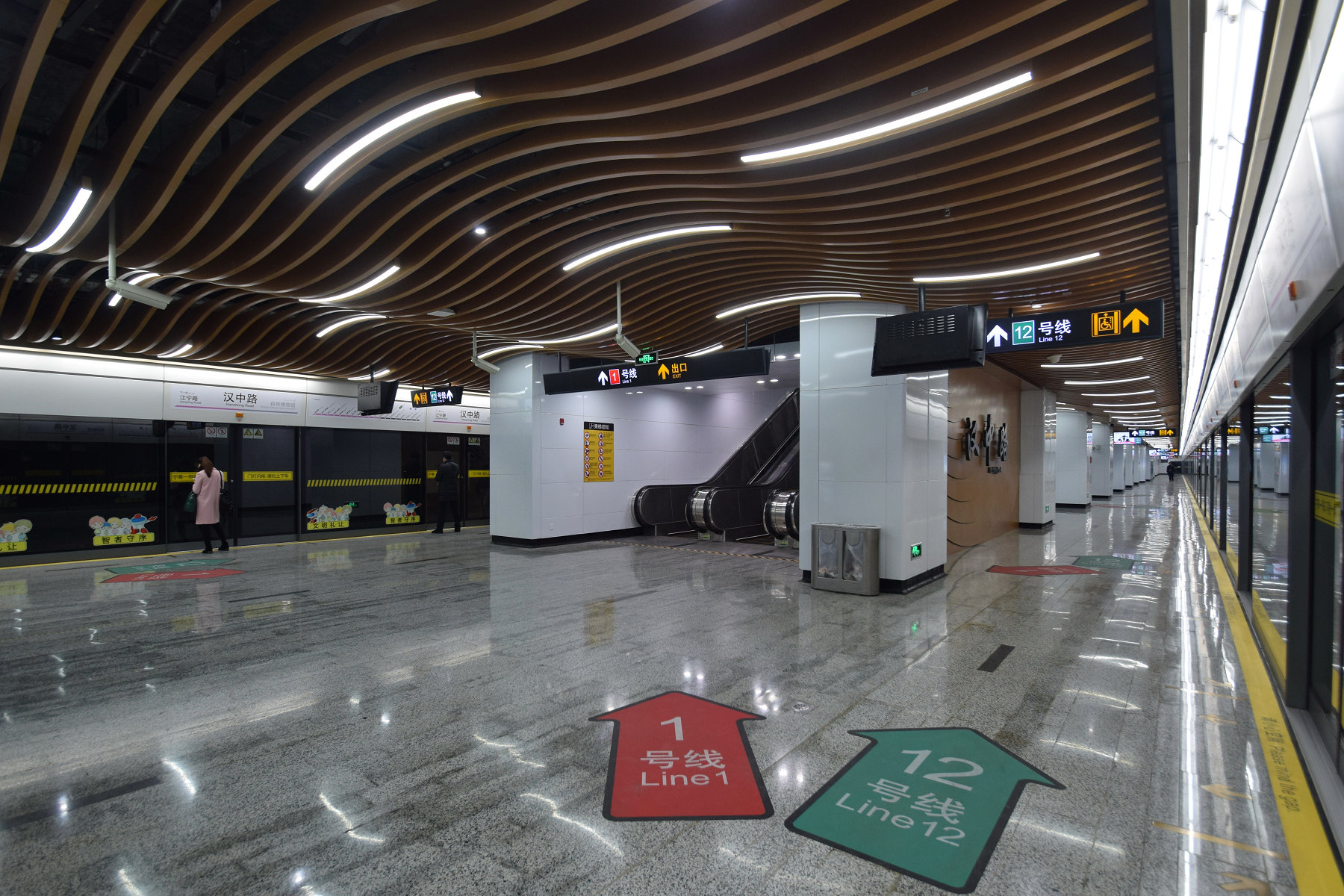
Line 13 platform

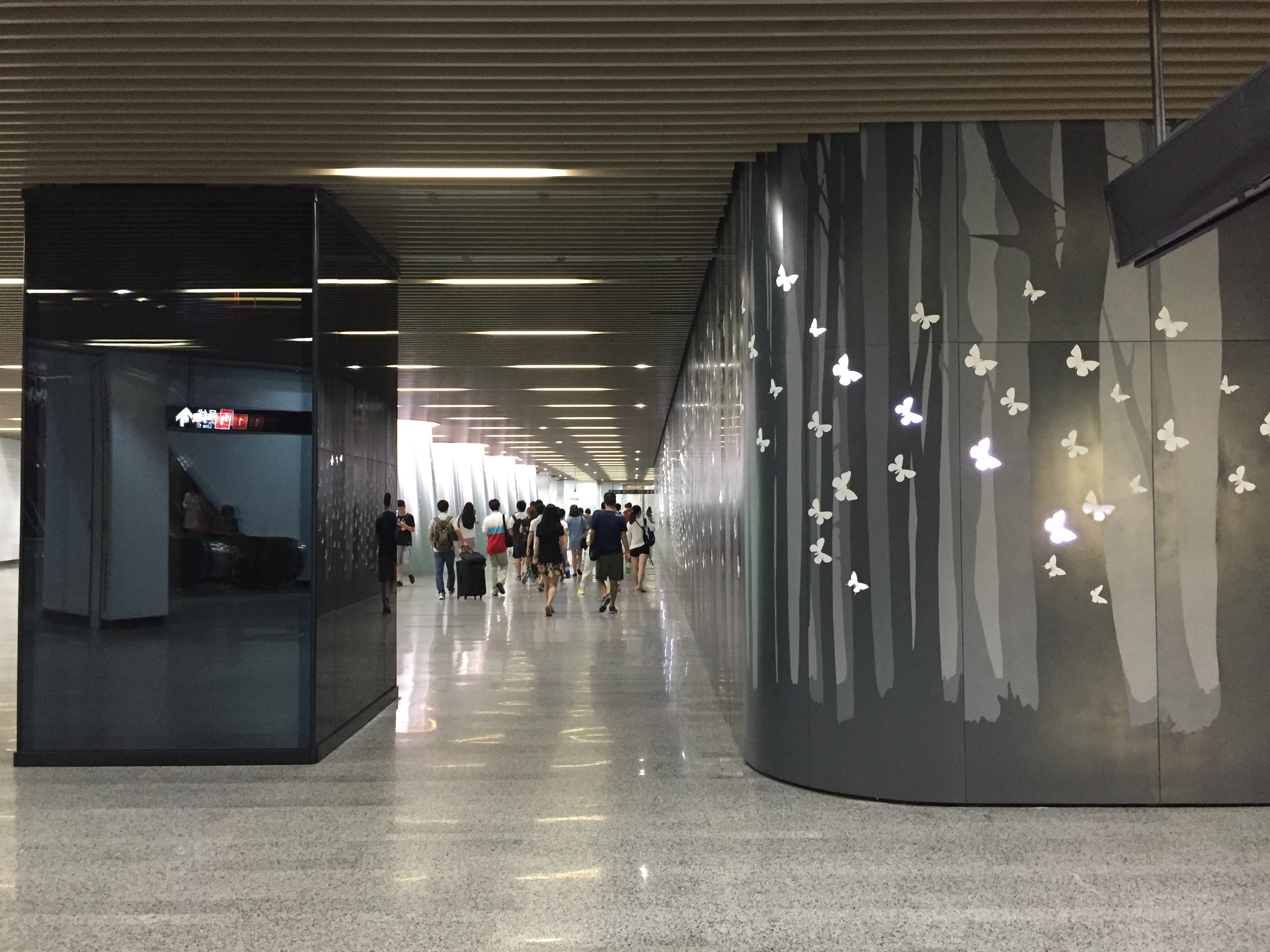
Inner decor of Hanzhong Road Station of Shanghai Metro line 12
