= Xinzha Road station =

Shanghai Metro station

Xinzha Road 新闸路
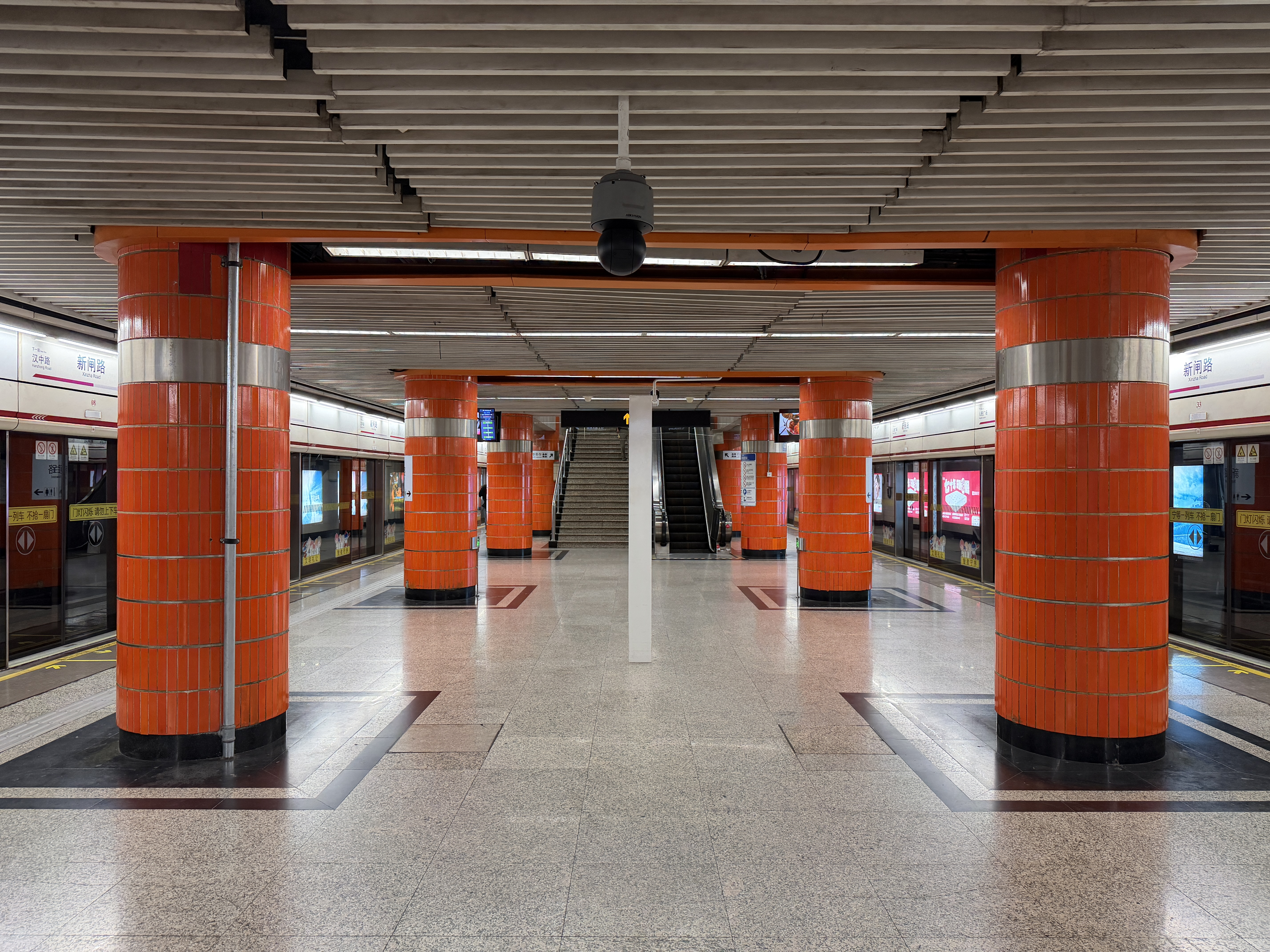
- Station platform

General information
- Location: south side of Xinzha Road; Huangpu District, Shanghai; China
- Coordinates: 31°14′18″N 121°28′05″E
- Operator: Shanghai No. 1 Metro Operation Co. Ltd.
- Line: Line 1
- Platforms: 2 (1 island platform)
- Tracks: 2

Construction
- Structure type: Underground
- Accessible: Yes

History
- Opened: 10 April 1995

Services
Preceding station	Shanghai Metro	Following station
Hanzhong Road towards Fujin Road	Line 1	People's Square towards Xinzhuang
Location
- Location within Shanghai

Xinzha Road (Chinese: 新闸路; pinyin: Xīnzhá Lù) is a station on Shanghai Metro Line 1, situated in Huangpu District within the inner ring-road of Shanghai. It opened on 10 April 1995 as part of the section between Jinjiang Park and Shanghai Railway Station.

== Details ==
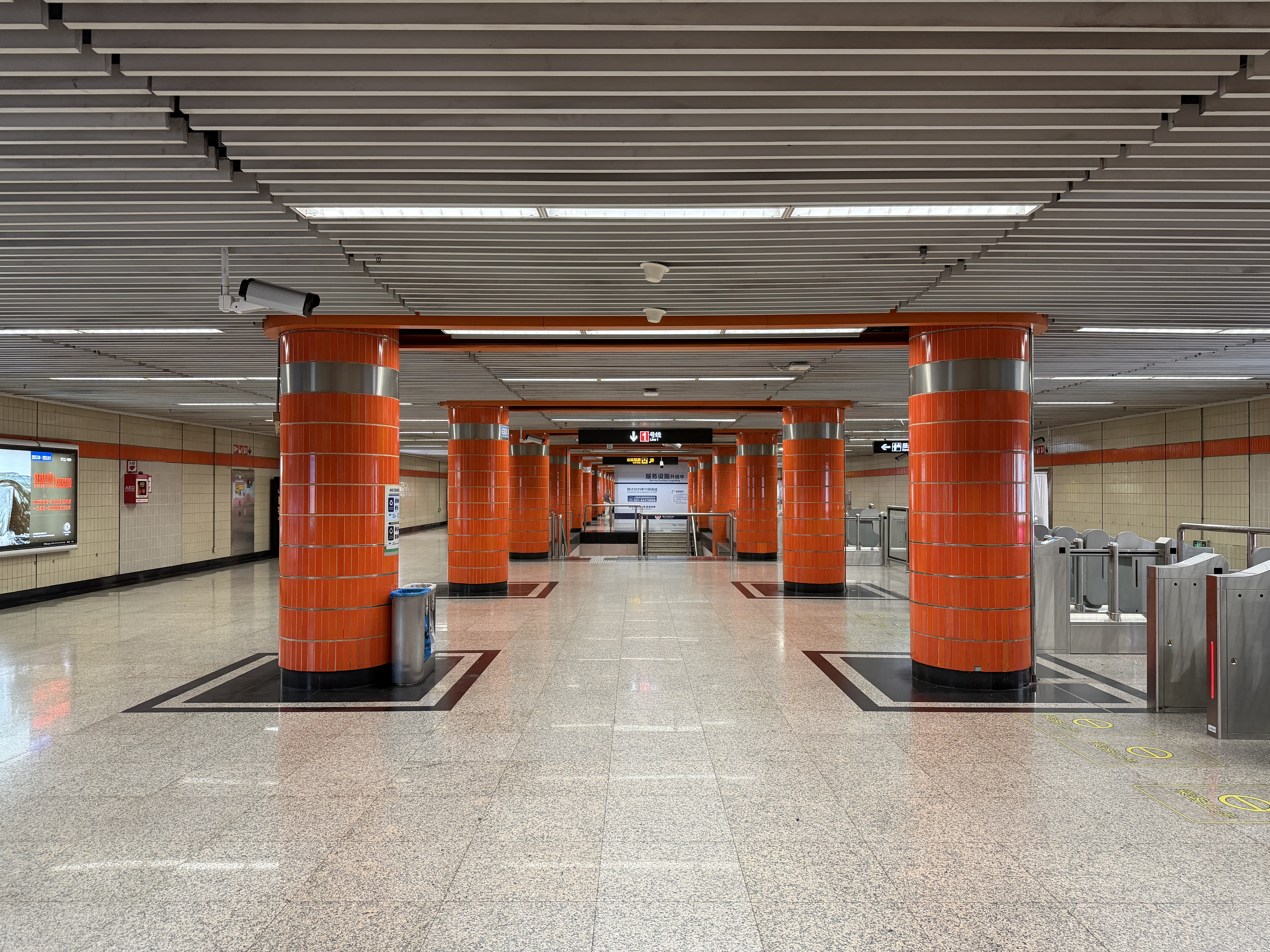
Concourse

Xinzha Road has two levels: a concourse, and an island platform with two tracks for line 1.

=== Entrances/exits ===
- 1: Xinzha Road, Wuzhen Road, Xinchang Road
- 5: Xinzha Road, Huanghe Road
- 6: Xinzha Road, Wenzhou Road
