= Jing'an, Shanghai =

Jing'an 静安区; 靜安區
- District
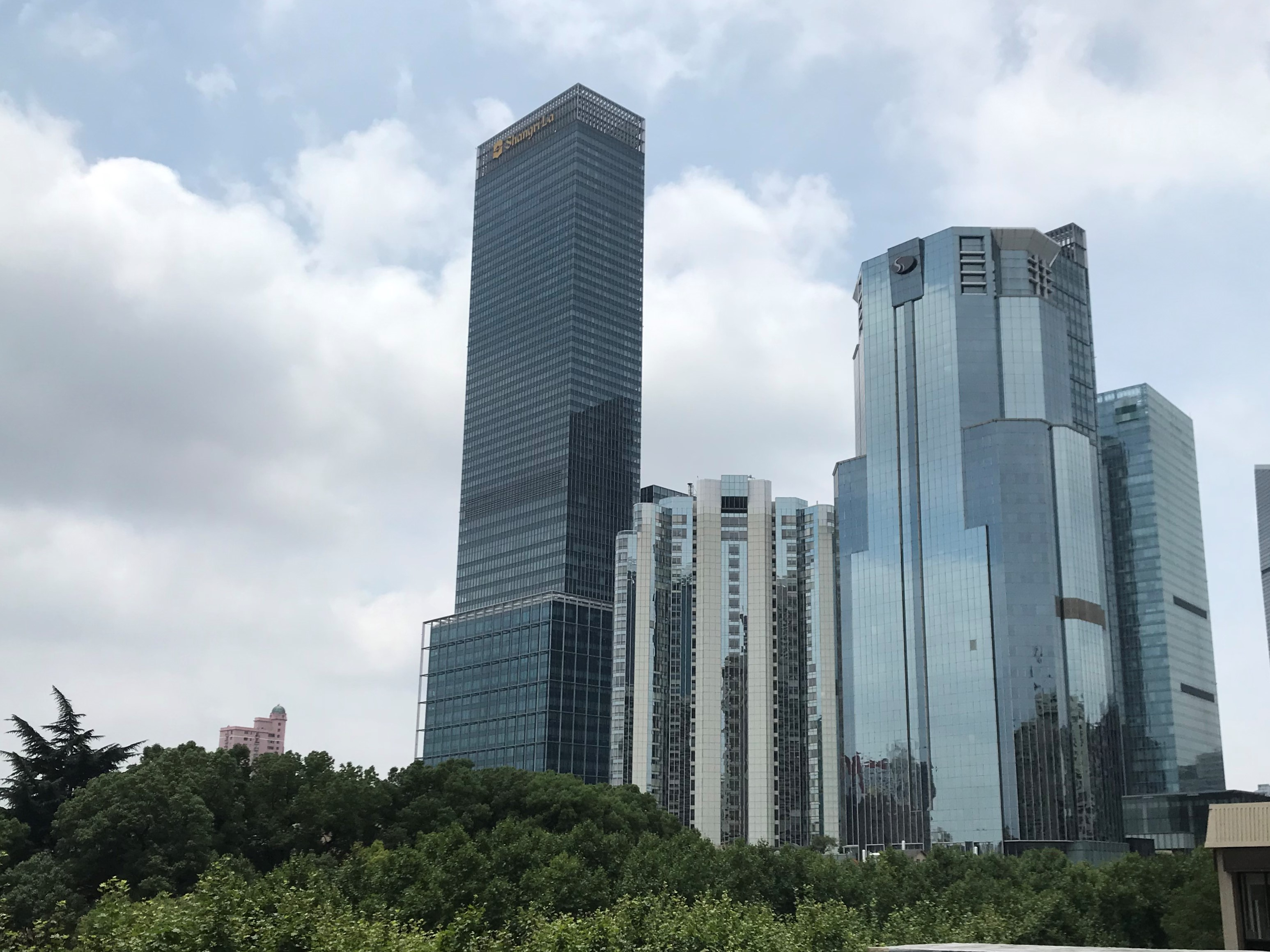
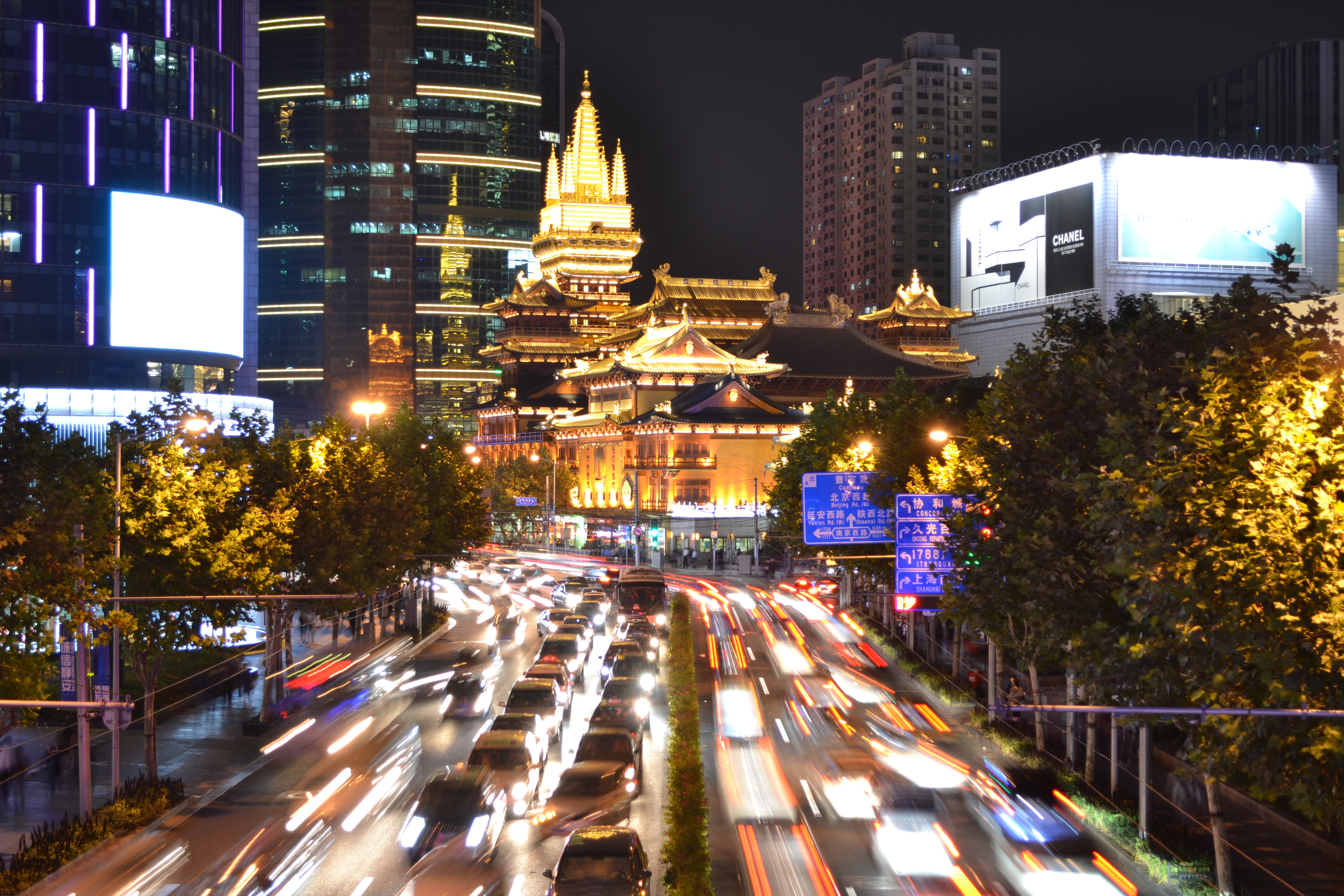
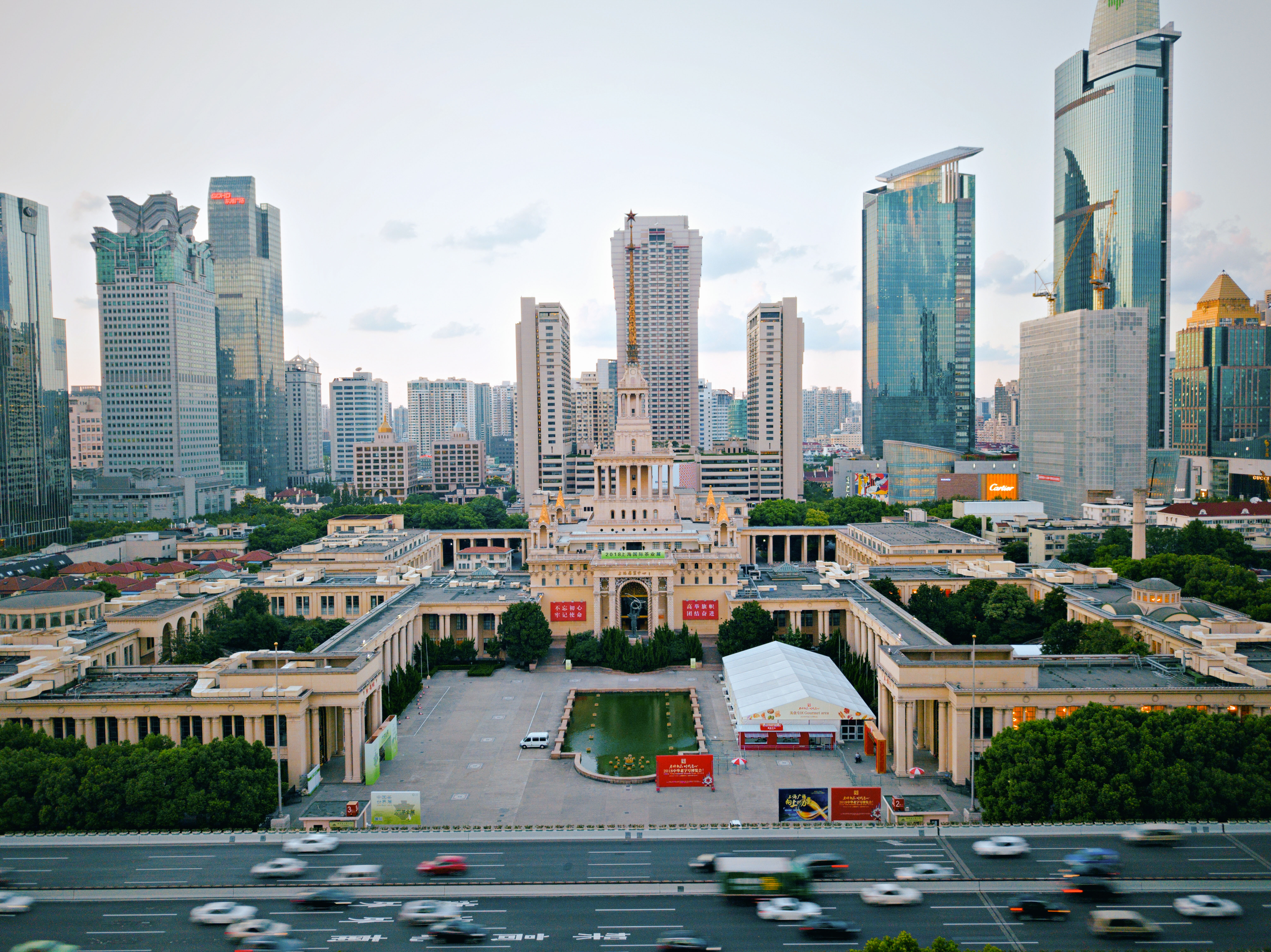
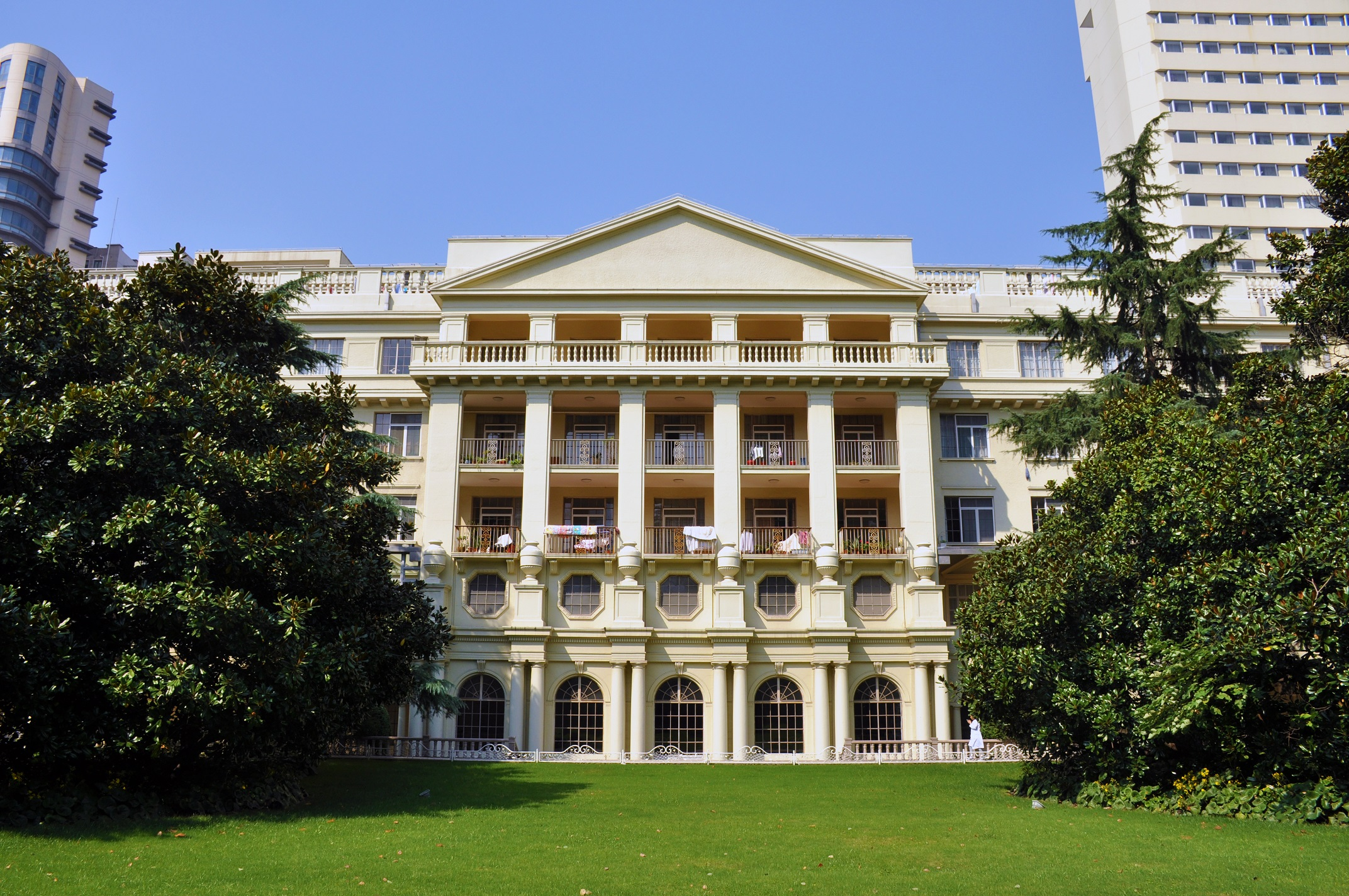
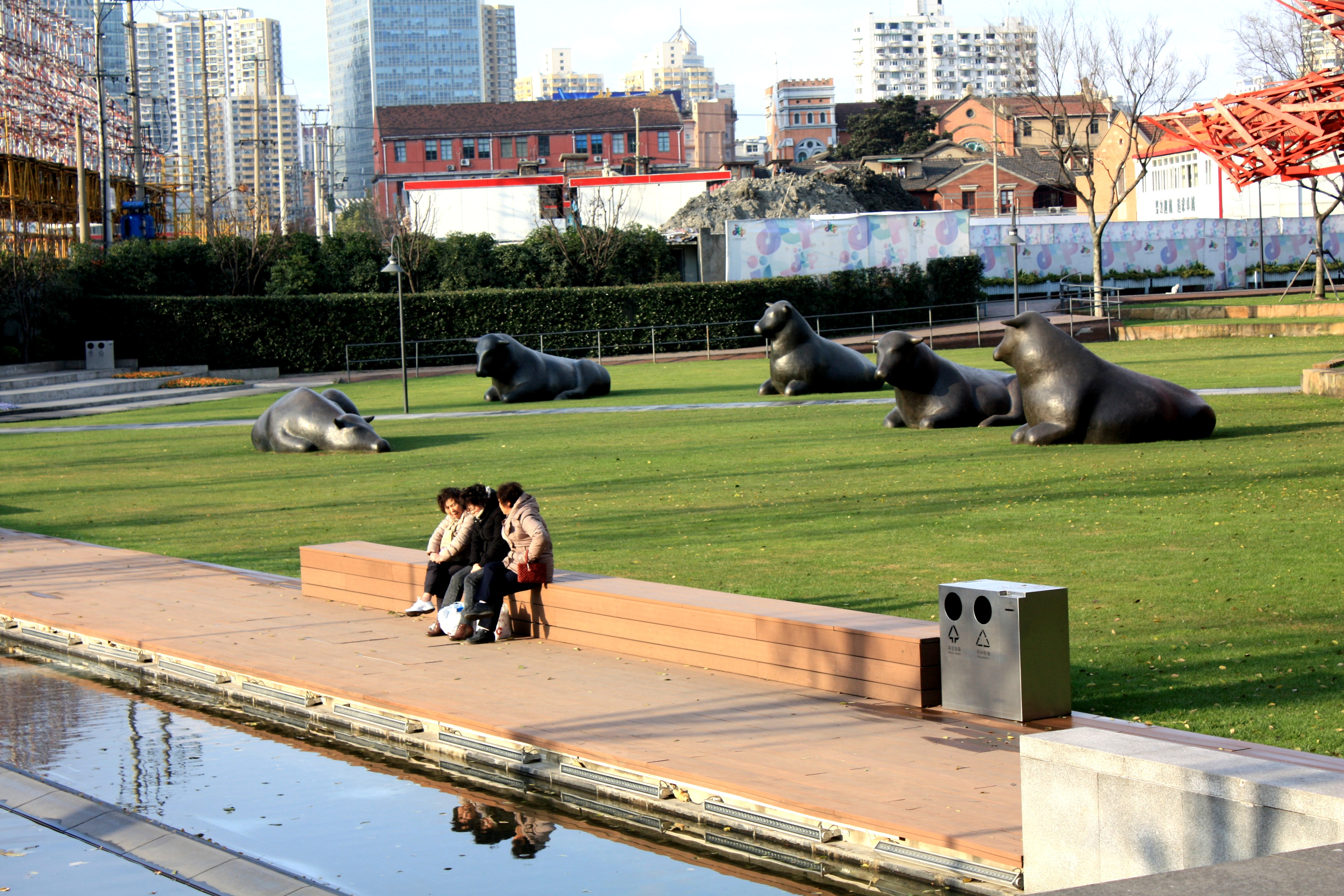
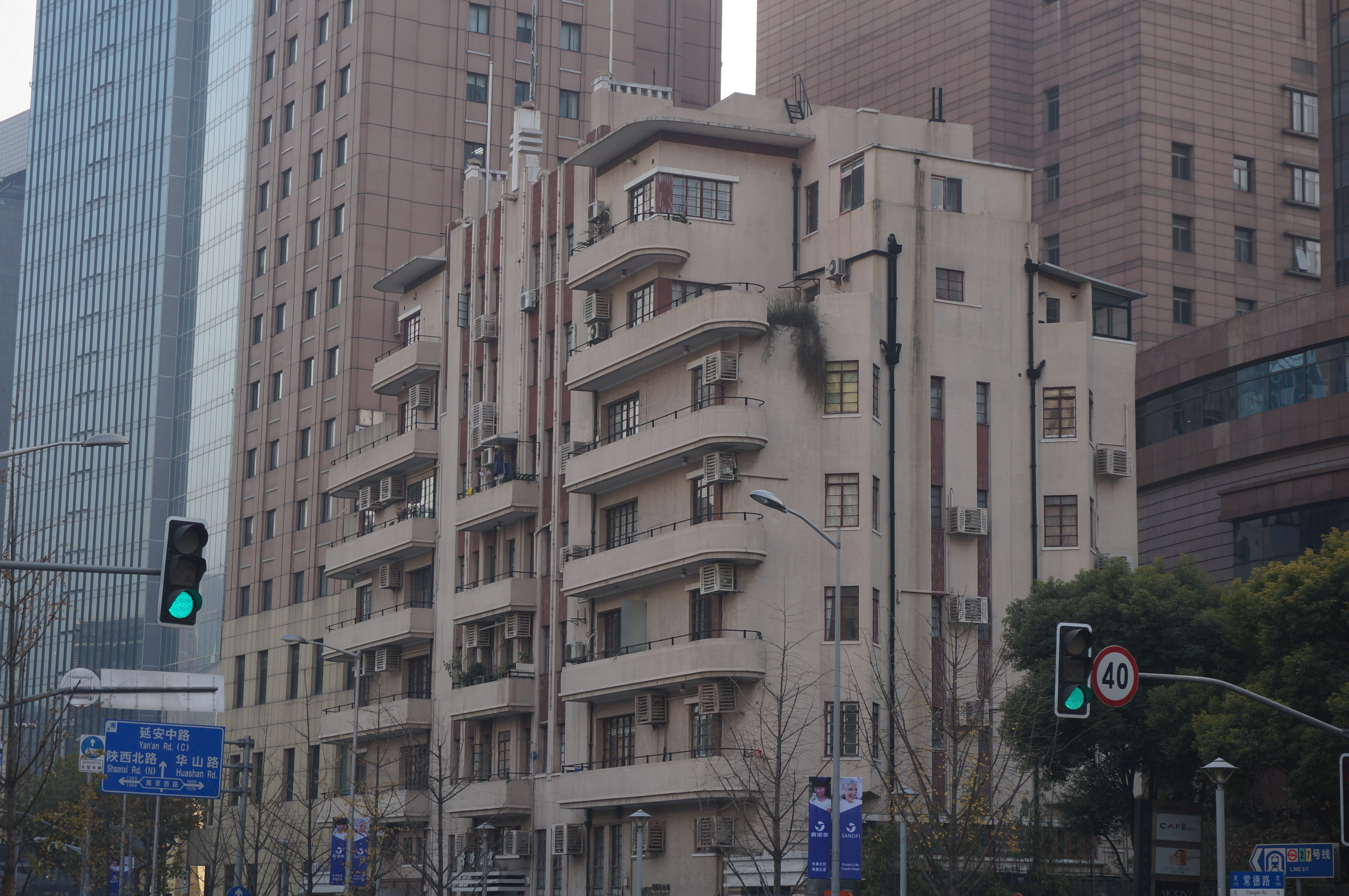
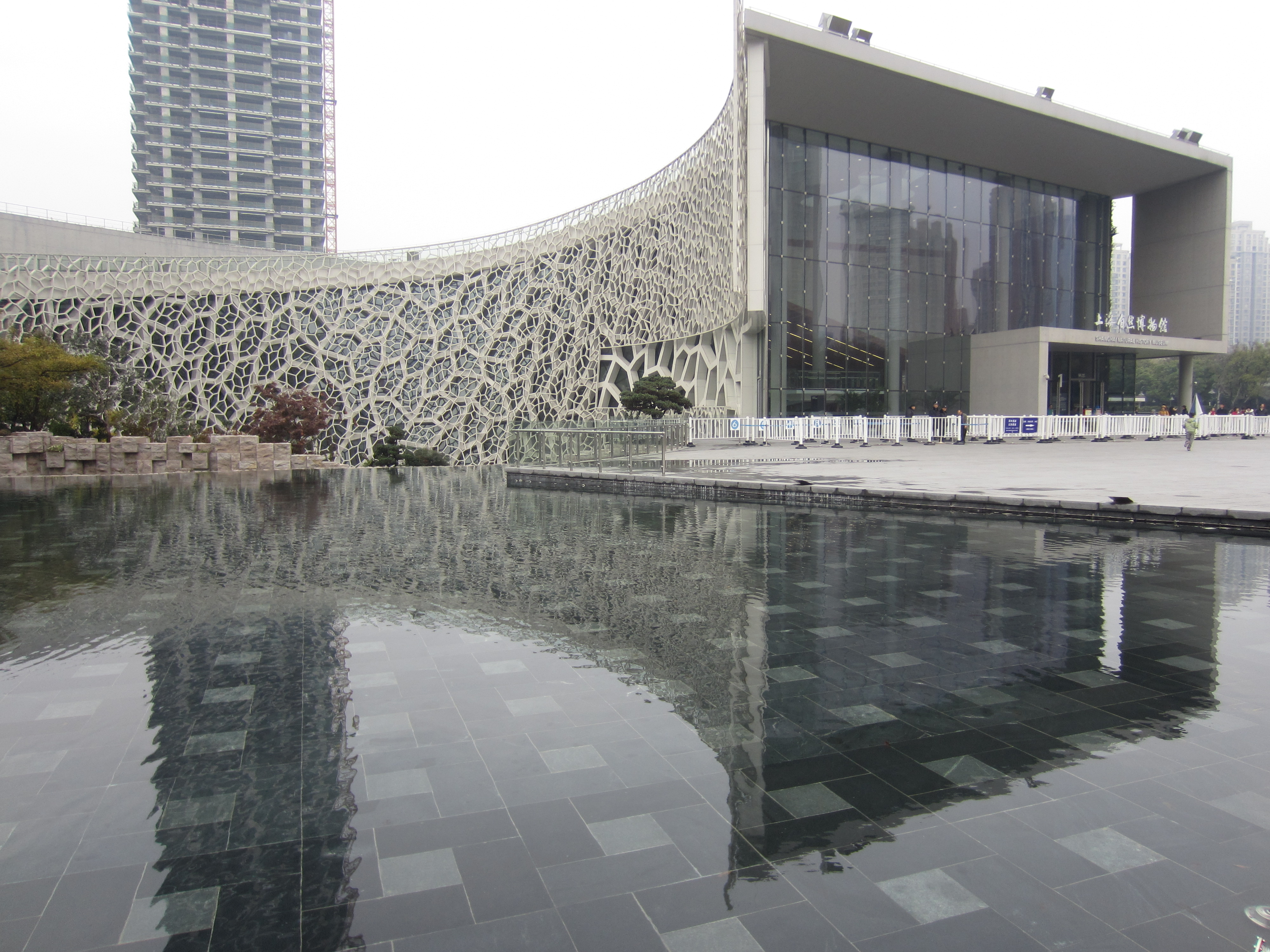
- Jing An Kerry Centre Jing'an Temple on West Nanjing Road Shanghai Exhibition Centre Huadong Hospital Jing'an Sculpture Park Changde Apartment Shanghai Natural History Museum

- Location within Shanghai
- Interactive map of Jing'an
- Coordinates: 31°13′46″N 121°26′33″E
- Country: China
- Municipality: Shanghai

Area
  - Total: 37.37 km^{2} (14.43 sq mi)

Population (2020)
  - Total: 975,707
  - Density: 26,110/km^{2} (67,620/sq mi)
- Area Code: 021
- Postal Code: 200040–200042(Former Jing'an) 200070–200073 200085 200435–2000436 200443(Former Zhabei)
- Website: www.jingan.gov.cn

Jing'an, Shanghai
- Simplified Chinese: 静安区
- Traditional Chinese: 靜安區
- Wugniu: zin^{4} oe^{1} chiu^{1}
Transcriptions
Standard Mandarin
- Hanyu Pinyin: Jìng'ān Qū
Wu
- Wugniu: zin^{4} oe^{1} chiu^{1}
- IPA: Shanghainese: [ʑin˩ ø˦ tɕʰy˩]
Yue: Cantonese
- Jyutping: zing^{6} on^{1} keoi^{1}

Jing'an District (静安区) is one of the central districts of Shanghai. In 2020, it had 975,707 inhabitants in an area of 37 km^{2} (14 sq mi).

The district borders the Hongkou to the east, Huangpu to the east and south, Putuo to the west, Baoshan District to the north and Changning to the west. On 4 November 2015, Zhabei merged with Jing'an District, bringing Shanghai down to 15 districts and one county.

Jing'an District is named after Jing'an Temple, an ancient traditional Chinese Buddhist temple. Today's temple is a new replica of the old one, located in the southern part of the district. An Art Deco "dancehall" is just across the street; the neighborhood is largely residential, but with many bars and restaurants. Jing'an Park, located opposite the temple, is popular among locals; it used to be a graveyard for foreigners in the old Shanghai.

Historically, the northern part of the district, what used to be Zhabei, has been highly populated with working class residents. However, due to the shift in the structure of industries and increasing number of immigrants from outside Shanghai, partly due to its reasonable real estate prices (compared to its counterparts such as Putuo and Hongkou), the district has become increasingly appealing to city residents.

== Economy and facilities ==
Development in the southern part of the district has been rapid. In three years the stock of Grade A office space in the southern part of the district increased approximately 320 percent, from a total of just 333,000 sqm in 2007 to 1,067,000 sqm in 2010. West Nanjing Road is one of Shanghai's premier shopping districts and is home to five-star hotels and exhibition centers as well as several upscale housing complexes. Key landmarks on West Nanjing Road include the Shanghai Exhibition Centre and the Shanghai Centre.

The southern part of the district is one of Shanghai's key central business and commercial districts. It contains numerous large office buildings, hotels, and many shopping venues at the street level. The district comprises a prominent portion of the Shanghai skyline. The district is also known for having many high-rise residential buildings.

The northern part of the district used to be the place of agglomeration of traditional industries such as flavorings factories and tires factories. In the last decade the municipality decided to move the old industry out to make space for more promising ones, such as the hi-tech and creative industries. It has attracted foreign companies to build offices, apartments and commercial retail outlets over there.

Jing'An District is also where the Shanghai Multimedia Valley (SMV) is located to attract media and IT talent. Major companies located in Zhabei include TÜV Rheinland, Royal Philips Electronics and Shanghai Bell Alcatel Business Systems Co., LTD. The Jing'an District is also home to Fotografiska Shanghai.

Daning Lingshi Park, the biggest green area in the downtown area, is surrounded by a series of cultural facilities such as the Zhabei Stadium and Shanghai Circus World.

The Shanghai University, Yanchang Campus is also located near the Daning Lingshi Park.

== Education ==
Universities & Colleges

- Shanghai University, Yanchang Campus
- Shanghai Theatre Academy, Huahan Road Campus

High school

- Shanghai Shixi High School (SSHS)
- Qiyi High School Affiliated to Tongji University

Primary School

- First Central Primary School of Jing'an District

Chinese Language Institutes

- Silk Mandarin

English Teaching Schools

- EF Education First, headquarters

== Subdistricts and towns ==
Name	Chinese (S)	Hanyu Pinyin	Shanghainese Romanization	Population (2010)	Area (km^{2})
Beizhan Subdistrict	北站街道	Běizhàn Jiēdào	poq dze ka do	77,968	1.99
Baoshan Road Subdistrict	宝山路街道	Bǎoshānlù Jiēdào	po se lu ka do	80,726	1.62
Caojiadu Subdistrict	曹家渡街道	Cáojiādù Jiēdào	dzo ka du ka do	71,511	1.50
Daning Road Subdistrict	大宁路街道	Dànínglù Jiēdào	da gnin lu ka do	77,710	6.24
Gonghexin Road Subdistrict	共和新路街道	Gònghéxīnlù Jiēdào	gon wu sin lu ka do	97,630	2.72
Jiangning Road Subdistrict	江宁路街道	Jiāngnínglù Jiēdào	kaon gnin lu ka do	75,272	1.84
Jing'ansi Subdistrict	静安寺街道	Jìng'ānsì Jiēdào	dzin eu zy ka do	29,173	1.57
Linfen Road Subdistrict	临汾路街道	Línfénlù Jiēdào	lin ven lu ka do	78,079	2.12
Pengpu Xincun Subdistrict	彭浦新村街道	Péngpǔ Xīncūn Jiēdào	ban phu sin tsen ka do	156,276	3.83
Shimen Second Road Subdistrict	石门二路街道	Shímén Èrlù Jiēdào	zaq men gnij lu ka do	34,288	1.09
Nanjing West Road Subdistrict	南京西路街道	Nánjīng Xīlù Jiēdào	neu cin sij lu ka do	36,544	1.62
Tianmu West Road Subdistrict	天目西路街道	Tiānmù Xīlù Jiēdào	thi moq sij lu ka do	34,749	1.94
Zhijiang West Road Subdistrict	芷江西路街道	Zhǐjiāng Xīlù Jiēdào	tzy kaon sij lu ka do	74,633	1.60
Pengpu town	彭浦镇	Péngpǔ Zhèn	ban phu tzen	152,725	7.88

== Transportation ==
=== Metro ===
Jing'an is currently served by nine metro lines operated by Shanghai Metro:

- Line 1 – Hanzhong Road, Shanghai Railway Station, North Zhongshan Road, Yanchang Road, Shanghai Circus World, Wenshui Road, Pengpu Xincun, Gongkang Road
- Line 2 – Jing'an Temple, West Nanjing Road
- Line 3 and Line 4 – Shanghai Railway Station, Baoshan Road
- Line 7 – Changping Road, Jing'an Temple
- Line 8 – North Xizang Road, Zhongxing Road, Qufu Road
- Line 10 – Tiantong Road
- Line 12 – West Nanjing Road, Hanzhong Road, Qufu Road, Tiantong Road
- Line 13 – Hanzhong Road, Shanghai Natural History Museum, West Nanjing Road
- Line 14 – Wuding Road, Jing'an Temple

== See also ==
- Jing'an Sculpture Park
