= Huxi Mosque =

Mosque in Putuo, Shanghai, China

- 沪西清真寺
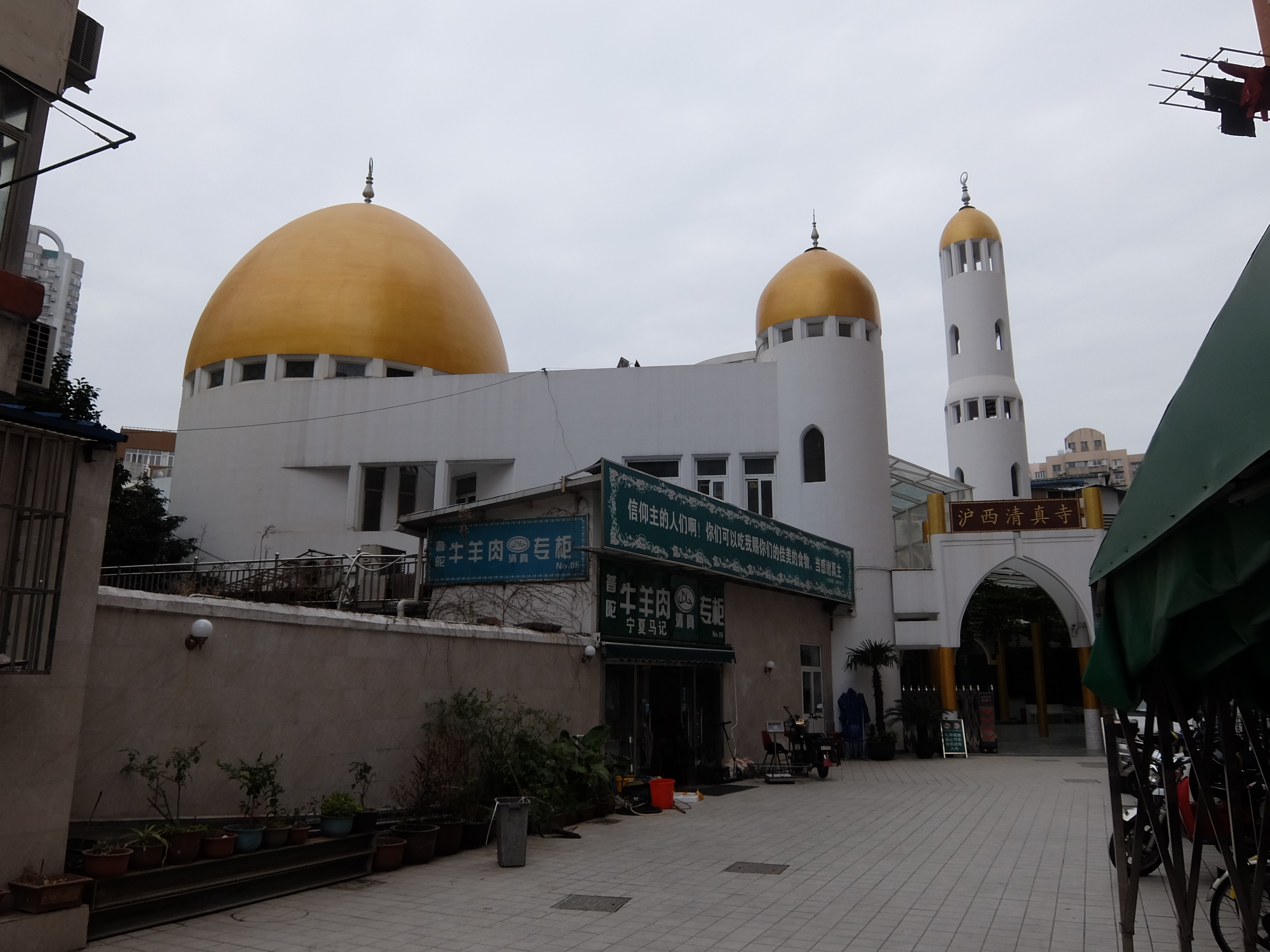

- Location of the mosque in Shanghai

Religion
- Affiliation: Sunni Islam
- Ecclesiastical or organizational status: Mosque
- Status: Active

Location
- Location: 3 Lane 1328, Changde Road, Putuo, Shanghai
- Country: China
- Interactive map of Huxi Mosque
- Coordinates: 31°14′34″N 121°26′05″E

Architecture
- Type: Mosque
- Groundbreaking: 1914
- Completed: 1922 (Xikang Road); 1994 (Changde Road)

Specifications
- Dome: 6
- Minaret: 1
- Minaret height: 25 m (82 ft)

The Huxi Mosque (simplified Chinese: 沪西清真寺; traditional Chinese: 滬西清真寺; pinyin: Hùxī Qīngzhēnsì) is a mosque in Putuo District, Shanghai, China.

== History ==
The mosque was constructed at Xikang Road in 1914–1921 and completed in 1922 under the name Yaoshuinong Mosque. In 1935, the mosque underwent renovation and was expanded to be able to accommodate 200 worshipers. The mosque resumed its religious activities in 1979. In April 1994, the mosque was moved to Changde Road.

== Architecture ==
The mosque covers 1,667 square metres (17,940 sq ft). The mosque consists of two-floor prayer hall. It is built with double arches and a fan-shaped roof. It also houses a teaching room, imam room, guesthouse and a wudu. It also features a butcher shop and a shop. The mosque consists of a 25-metre-high (82 ft) minaret and six domes.

== Transportation ==
The mosque is accessible within walking distance north west of Changshou Road Station of Shanghai Metro.

== See also ==
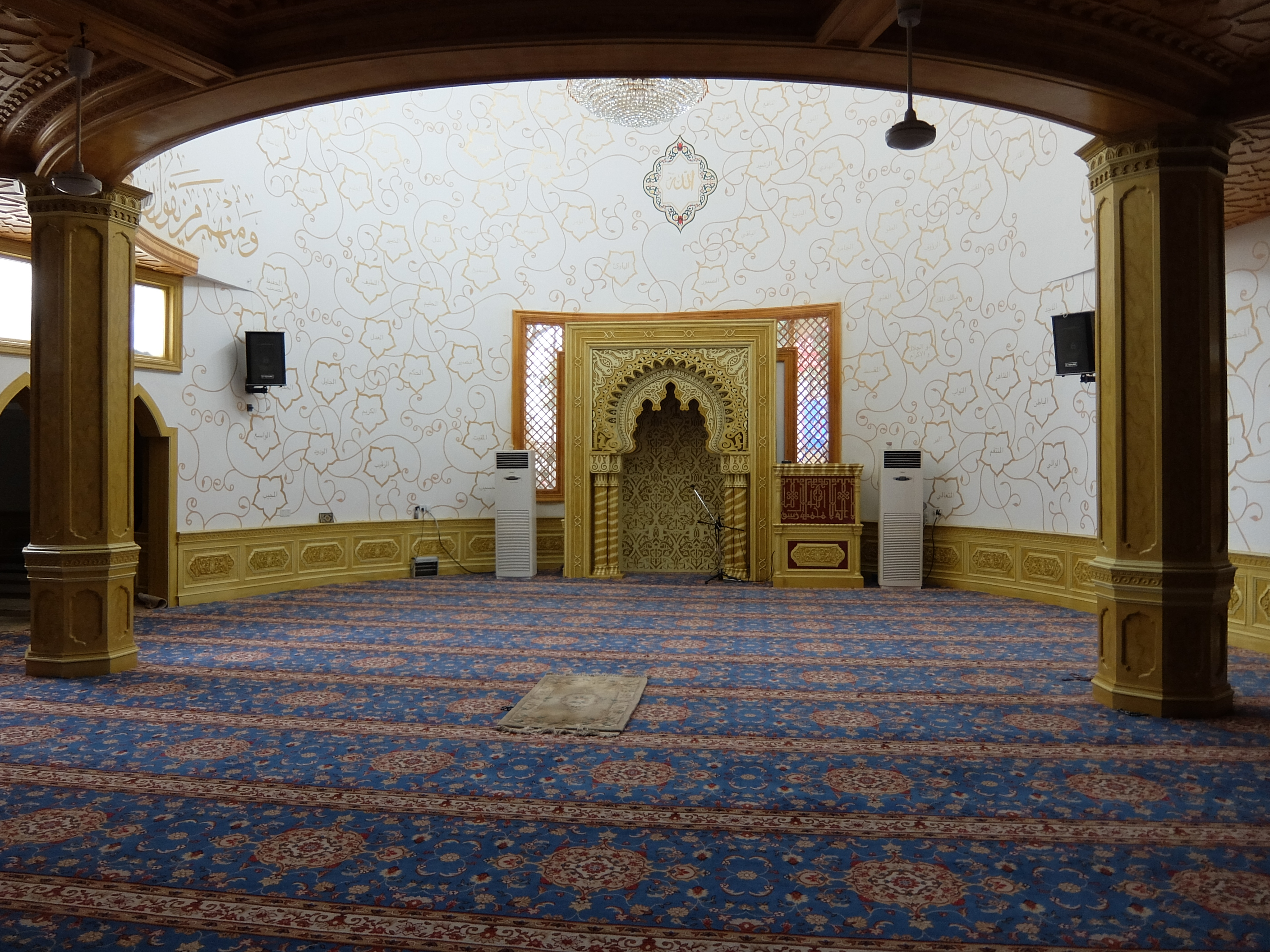
The mosque prayer hall

- Islam in China
- List of mosques in China
