= Shanghai Shixi High School =

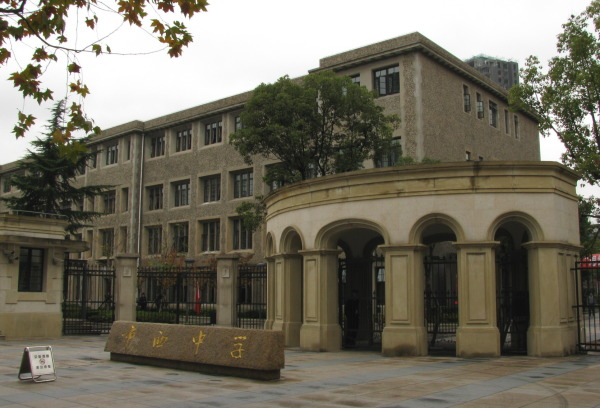
Shanghai Shixi High School

Location
- 404 Yuyuan Road, Jing'an District; Shanghai, 200040; China

Information
- School type: Public High School
- Motto: "好学力行" (Chinese); Diligere Scientia et Facere Officium (Latin)
- Established: 1870
- Authority: Bureau of Education of Jing'an District
- Principal: Dong Junwu (2012-)
- Teaching staff: appr.200
- Grades: 3
- Gender: Coeducational
- Age range: 15-18
- Average class size: 30-40
- Campus size: 0.04km^2 (0.015 mi^2)
- Campus type: Urban
- Color: Shixi Navy
- Newspaper: Flying Shixi
- Website: http://www.shixi.edu.sh.cn/

Shanghai Shixi High School (上海市市西中学) is a public senior high school in Jing'an, Shanghai, China.
