= Jing'an Sculpture Park =

Sculpture park in Shanghai, China

Coordinates: 31.2368°N 121.4594°E

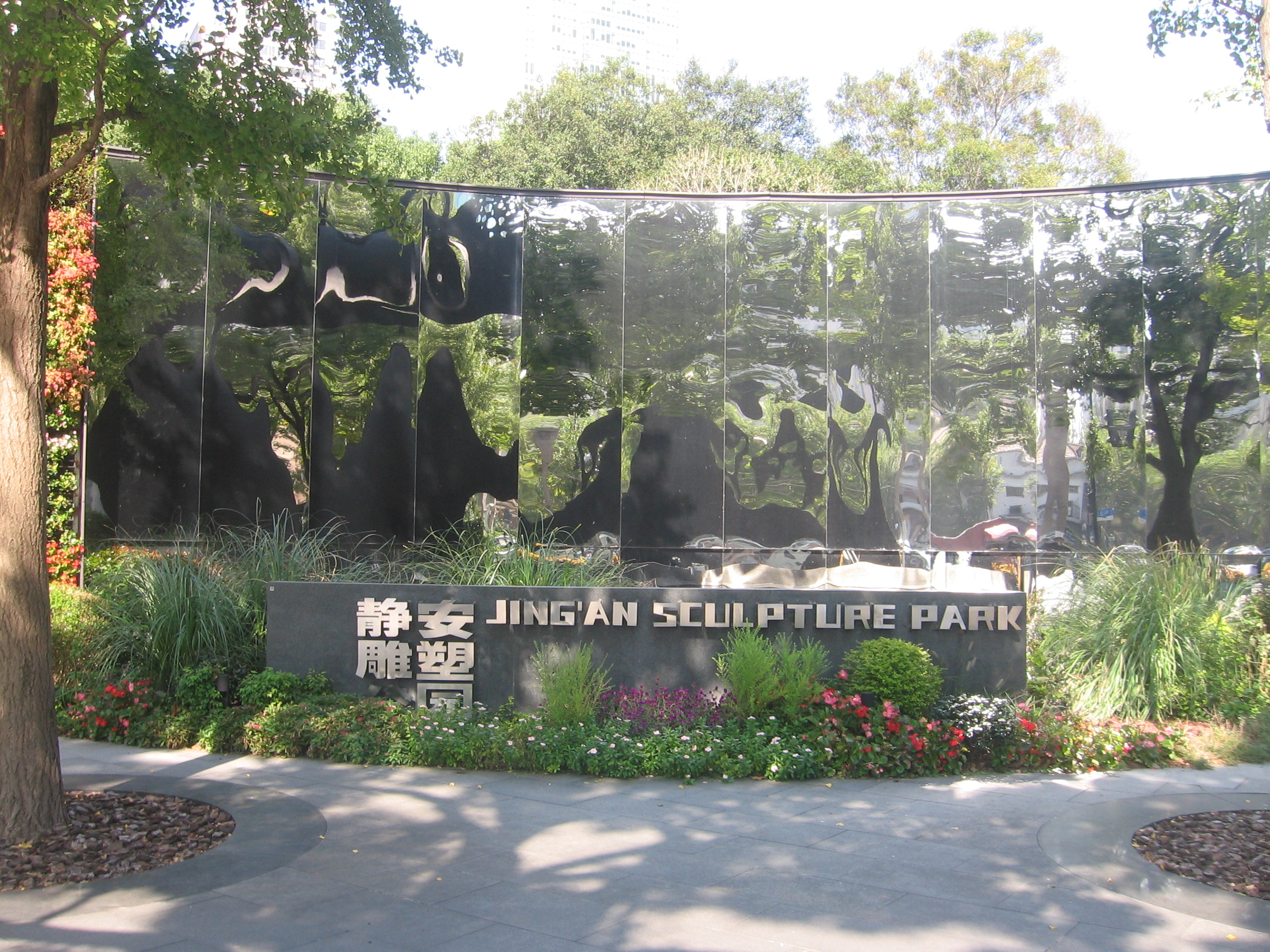
- Interactive map of Jing'an Sculpture Park
- Nearest city: Jing'an District, Shanghai, China

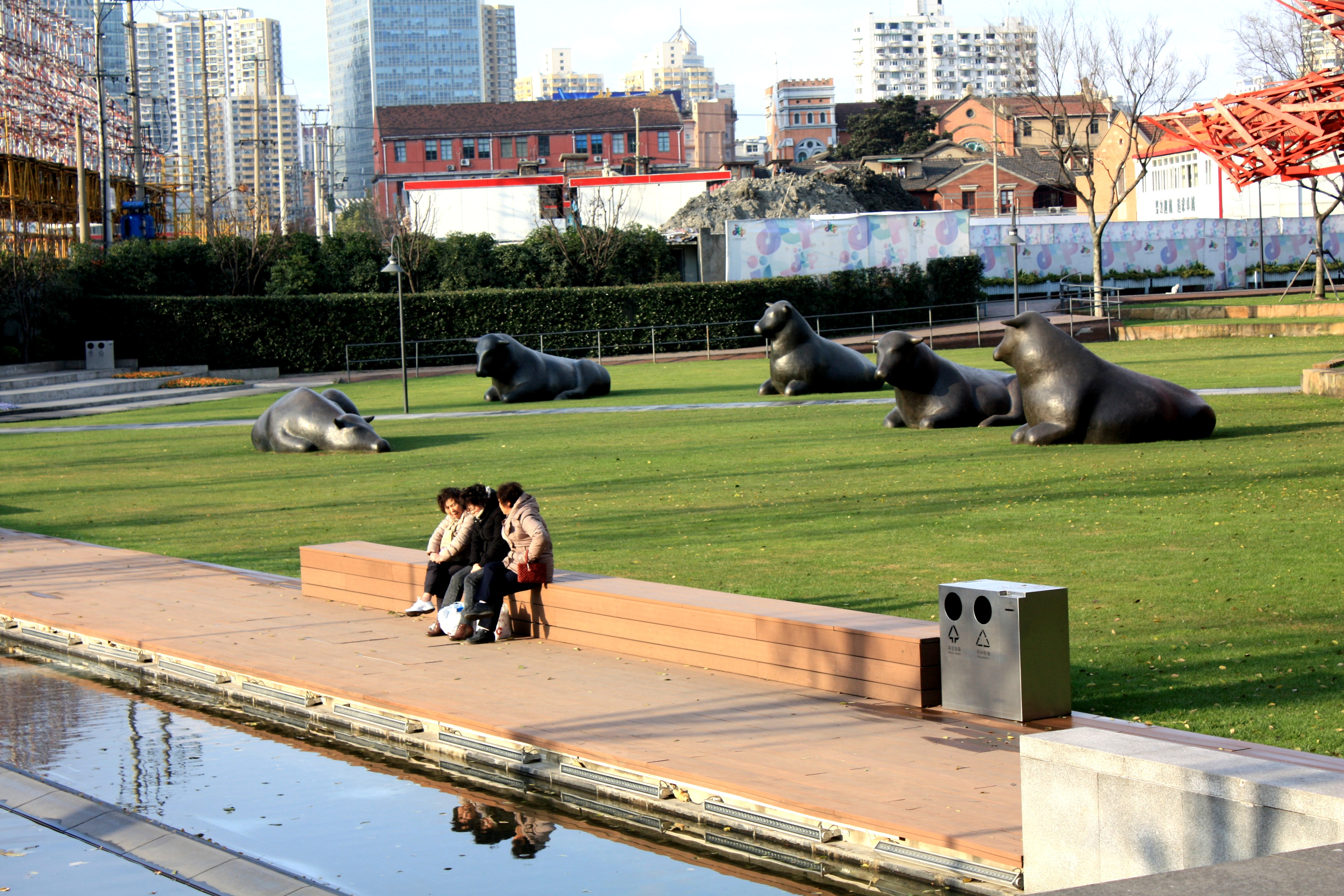
The park in 2011

Jing'an Sculpture Park, or Jingan Sculpture Park, is a sculpture park in the Jing'an District of Shanghai, China.

== Works ==
- Colors of Happiness
- Elemental Spring: Harmony
- Flying Colors
- Girouette Monumentale
- Horse
- Large Parrot Screams Color
- Music Power
- Ostrich Hide and Seek
- Red Beacon
- Urban Fox

== See also ==
- Shanghai Natural History Museum
