= Shanghai Natural History Museum =

Museum in Shanghai, China

Coordinates: 31°14′13″N 121°27′30″E

- 上海自然博物馆
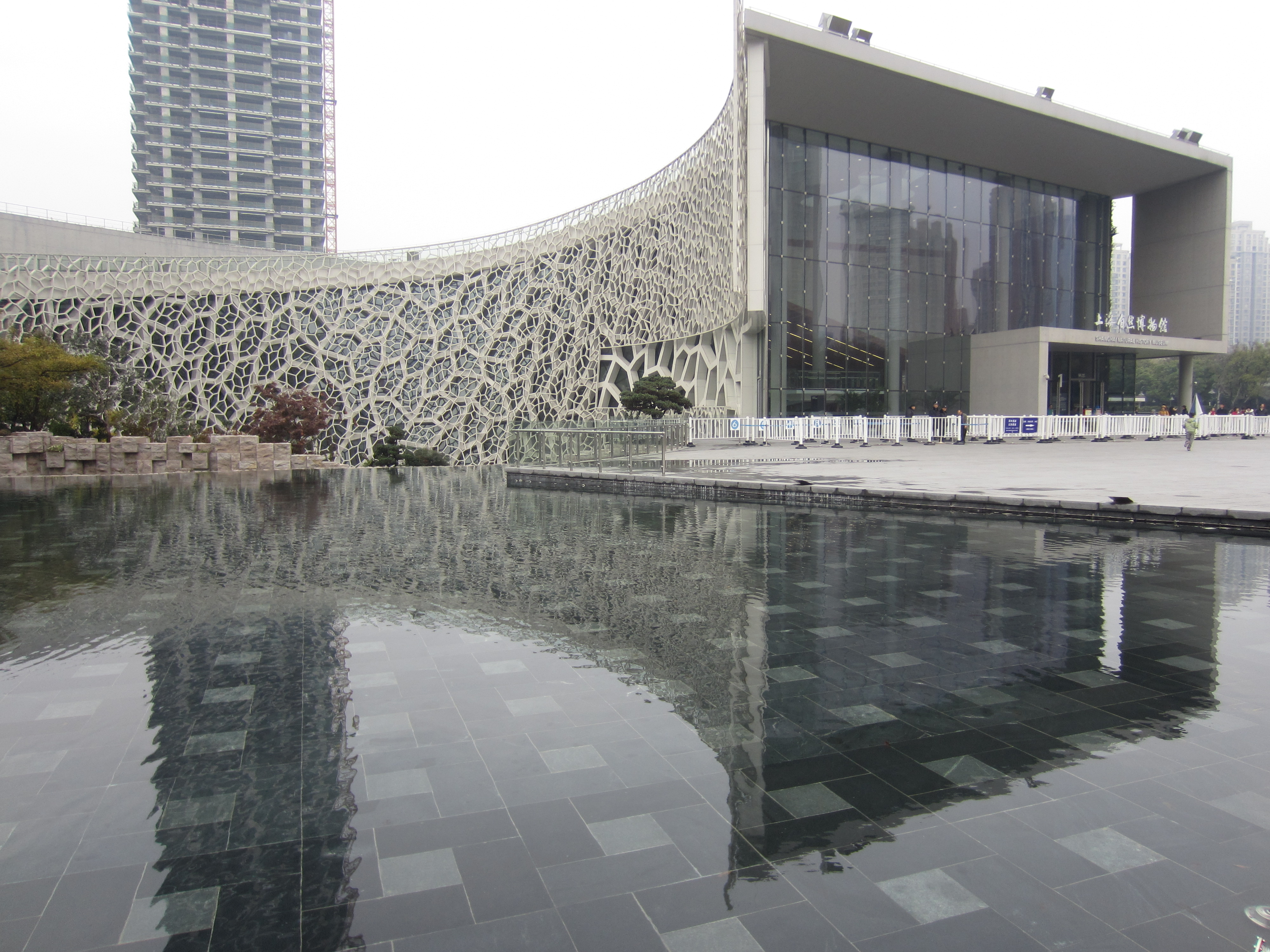
- The museum's exterior in 2015
- Established: 1956
- Collections: Biological specimen
- Collection size: >28,000
- Website: www.snhm.org.cn

The Shanghai Natural History Museum (Chinese: 上海自然博物馆; pinyin: Shànghǎi Zìrán Bówùguǎn; Shanghainese: Zånhae Zyzoe Pohvehguoe) is a museum dedicated to natural history in the city of Shanghai. It is one of the largest museums of natural sciences in China. Formerly housed in the Shanghai Cotton Exchange Building, the museum was moved to a purpose-built site in the Jing'an Sculpture Park in 2015.

== Location ==
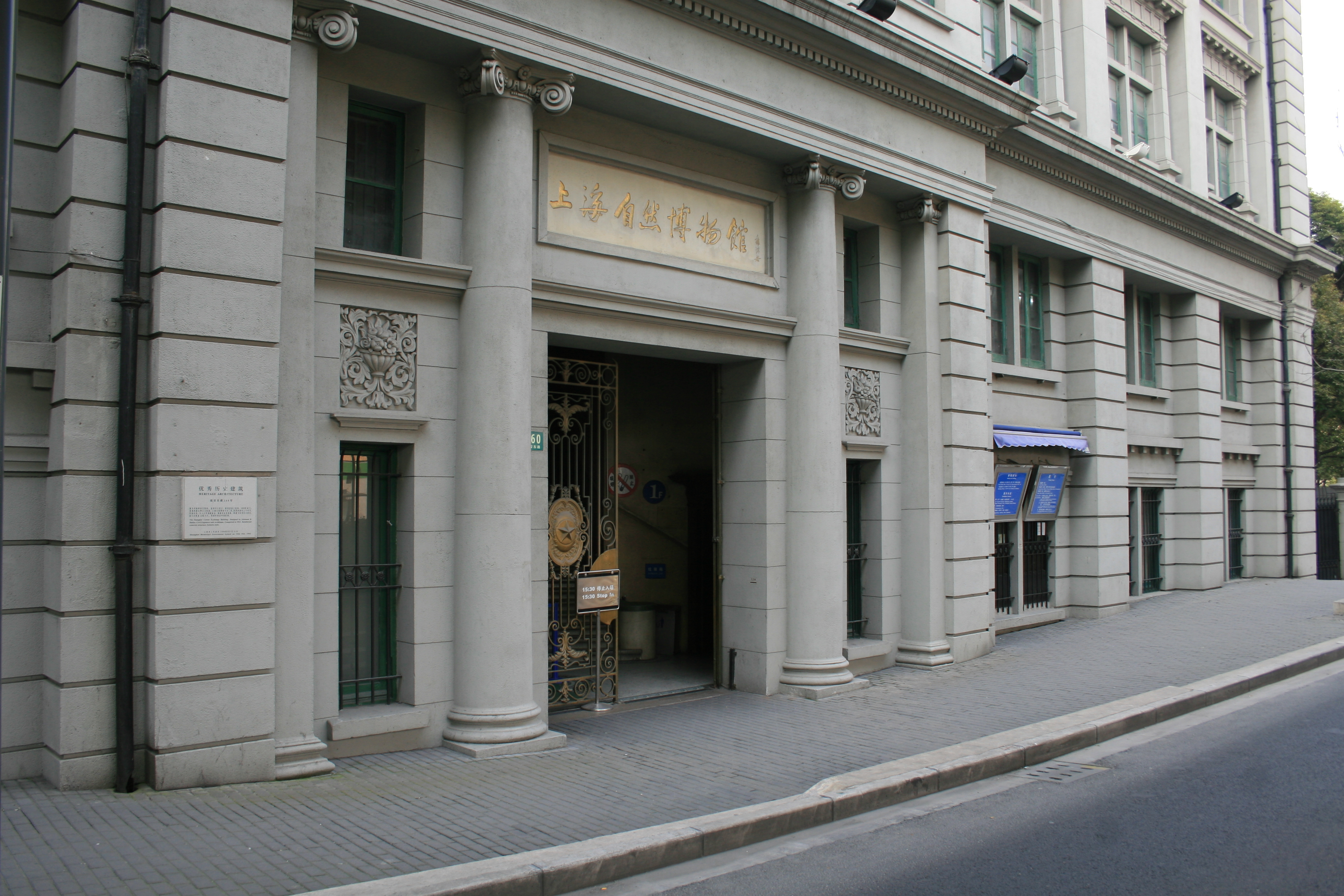
Entrance of the Shanghai Cotton Exchange Building, the former site of the museum

The museum was established in 1956 in the Shanghai Cotton Exchange Building, a classical British structure built in 1923. It was located at 260 East Yan'an Road in Huangpu District, near the intersection of South Henan Road. It was designated a Heritage Building by the Shanghai Municipal Government in 1994. However, the Yan'an Elevated Road has since been constructed within meters in front of the building.

The new 44,517-square-meter building is in the Jing'an Sculpture Park. Opened to the public in 2015, the Shanghai Natural History Museum has moved to the new location.

== Collections and exhibits ==
The museum has a collection of 240,000 samples, including over 62,000 pieces of animal specimens, 135,000 plant specimens, 700 specimens of the Stone Age, and 1,700 specimens of minerals. There are also rare species which cannot be found elsewhere outside China, such as a Yellow River mammoth, a giant salamander, a giant panda, and a Yangtze alligator.

The largest exhibit is a 140-million-year-old dinosaur skeleton of Mamenchisaurus hochuanensis Young et Zhao from Sichuan Province, which is over four stories high. The museum also has two mummies and several human embryos.

== See also ==
- List of museums in China
