= Yuyuan Garden station =

Shanghai Metro station

Yuyuan Garden 豫园
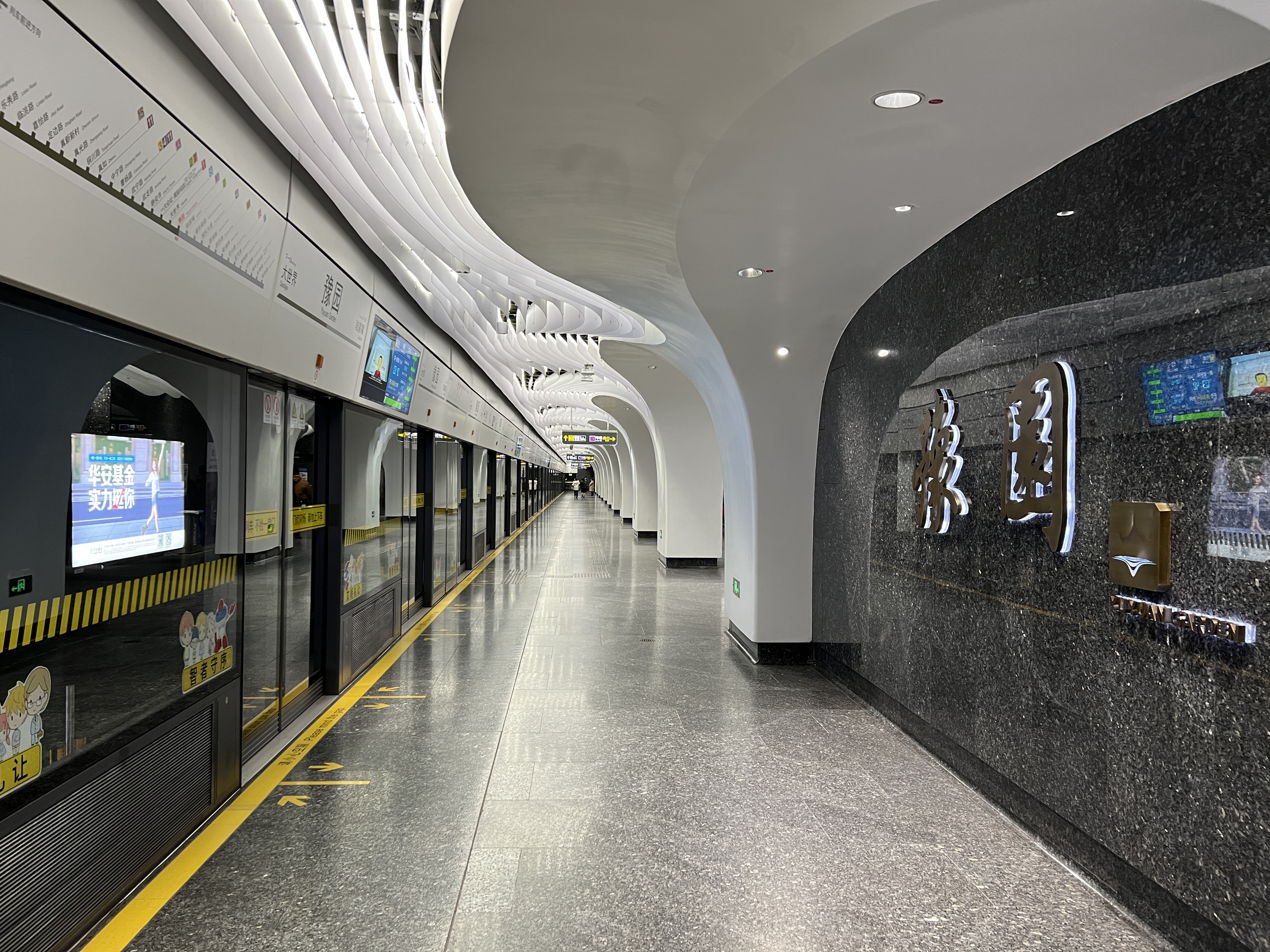
- Line 14 platform

General information
- Location: Intersection of South Henan Road and Renmin Road; Huangpu District, Shanghai; China
- Coordinates: 31.2303°N 121.482°E
- Operated by: Shanghai No. 1 Metro Operation Co. Ltd.
- Lines: Line 10; Line 14
- Platforms: 4 (2 island platforms)
- Tracks: 4

Construction
- Structure type: Underground
- Accessible: Yes

Other information
- Station code: L10/15 (Line 10)

History
- Opened: Line 10: 10 April 2010 (16 years ago); Line 14: 30 December 2021 (4 years ago)

Services
Preceding station	Shanghai Metro	Following station
Laoximen towards Hongqiao Railway Station or Hangzhong Road	Line 10	East Nanjing Road towards Jilong Road
Dashijie towards Fengbang	Line 14	Lujiazui towards Guiqiao Road
Location

Yuyuan Garden (simplified Chinese: 豫园; traditional Chinese: 豫園; pinyin: Yùyuán) is an interchange station on Line 10 and Line 14 of the Shanghai Metro. It is located near its namesake, the Yu Garden in Huangpu District, Shanghai. The station entered operation on April 10, 2010.

After the completion and opening of Line 14 on December 30, 2021, this station became an interchange station between its two lines.

The excavation depth of the station is 36 meters, which made it the deepest metro station in Shanghai when the station opened. The current deepest station in Shanghai is the 44-meter deep Jinghong Road Station of the Airport Link Line.

== Station Layout ==
G	Entrances and Exits	Exits 1, 3-7
B1	Line 10 Concourse	Faregates, Ticket Machines, Customer Service
B2	Line 14 Concourse	Faregates, Ticket Machines, Customer Service
B2	Westbound	← 10 towards Hongqiao Railway Station or Hangzhong Road (Laoximen)
B2	Island platform, doors open on the left
B2	Eastbound	10 towards Jilong Road (East Nanjing Road) →
B3	Westbound	← 14 towards Fengbang (Dashijie)
B3	Island platform, doors open on the left
B3	Eastbound	14 towards Guiqiao Road (Lujiazui) →

== Exits/entrances ==
Connecting to Line 10 Concourse

- 1: South Henan Road, Renmin Road, Yu Garden
- 3: South Henan Road, Fuyou Road
- 3B: South Henan Road, Fuyou Road
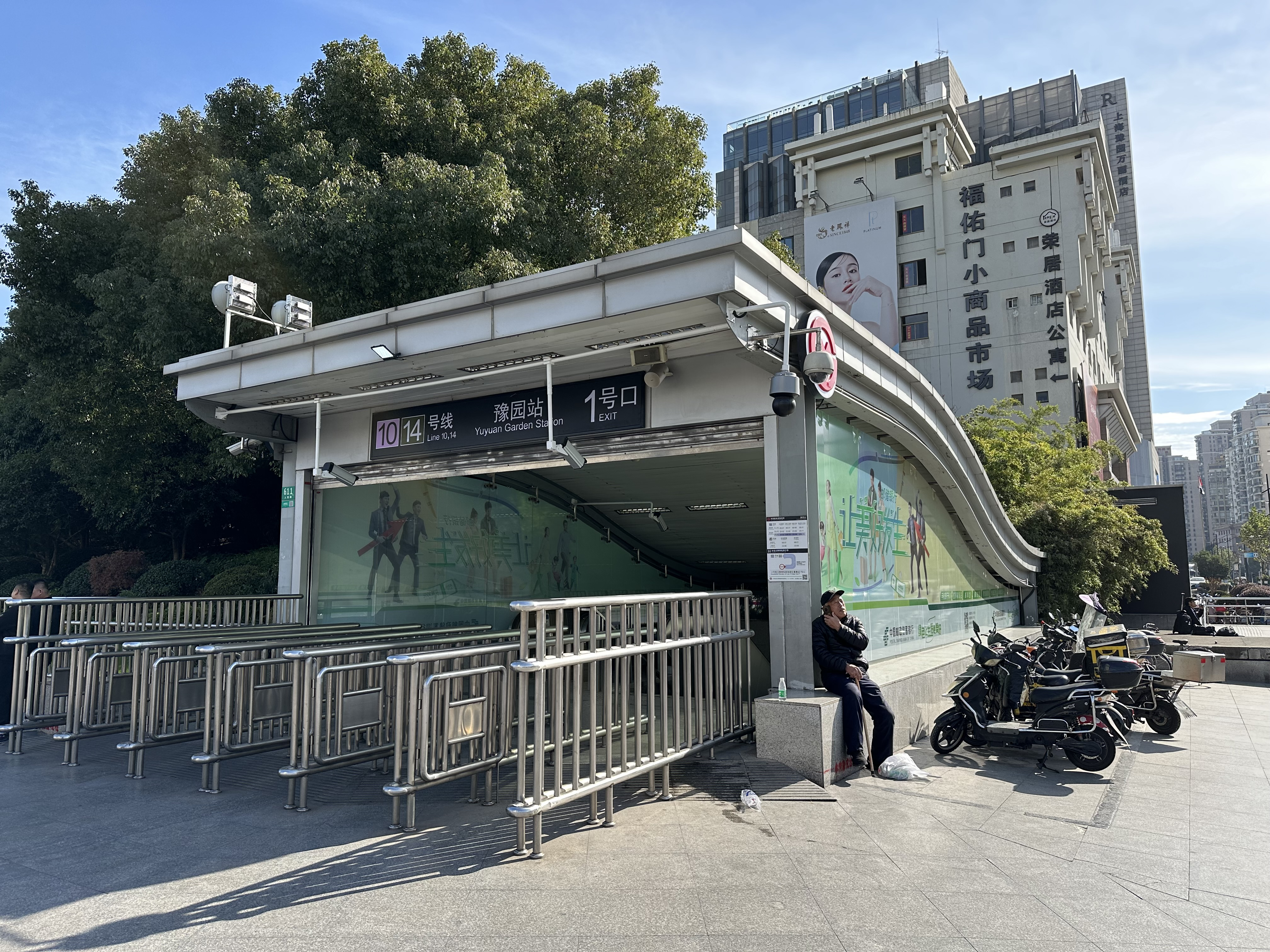
Exit 1

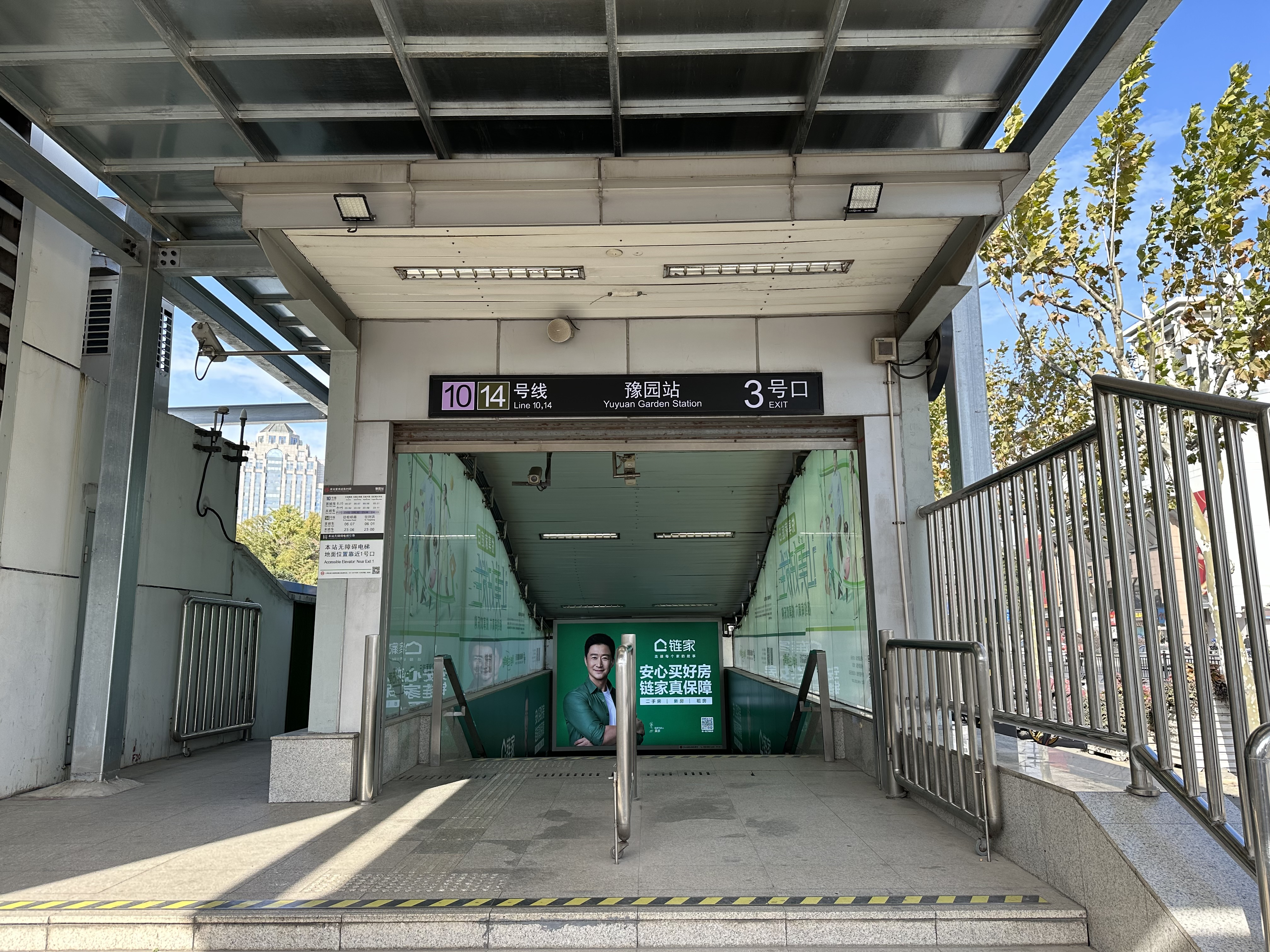
Exit 3

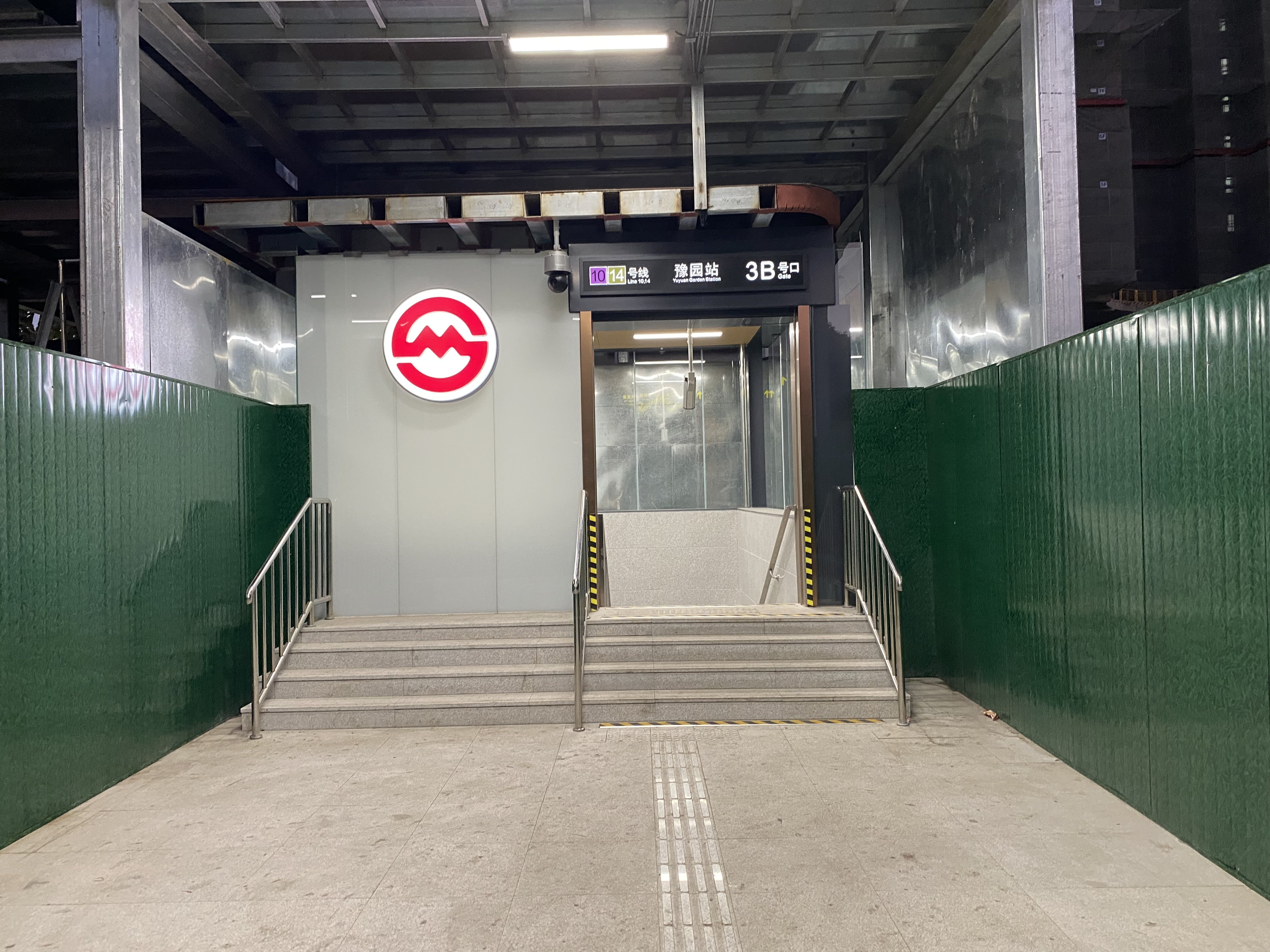
Exit 3B

Connecting to Line 14 Concourse

- 4: South Henan Road, Renmin Road, Yu Garden
- 5: Renmin Road, Zijin Road, South Henan Road
- 6: Renmin Road, South Jiangxi Road
- 7: Renmin Road, South Sichuan Road, Yu Garden
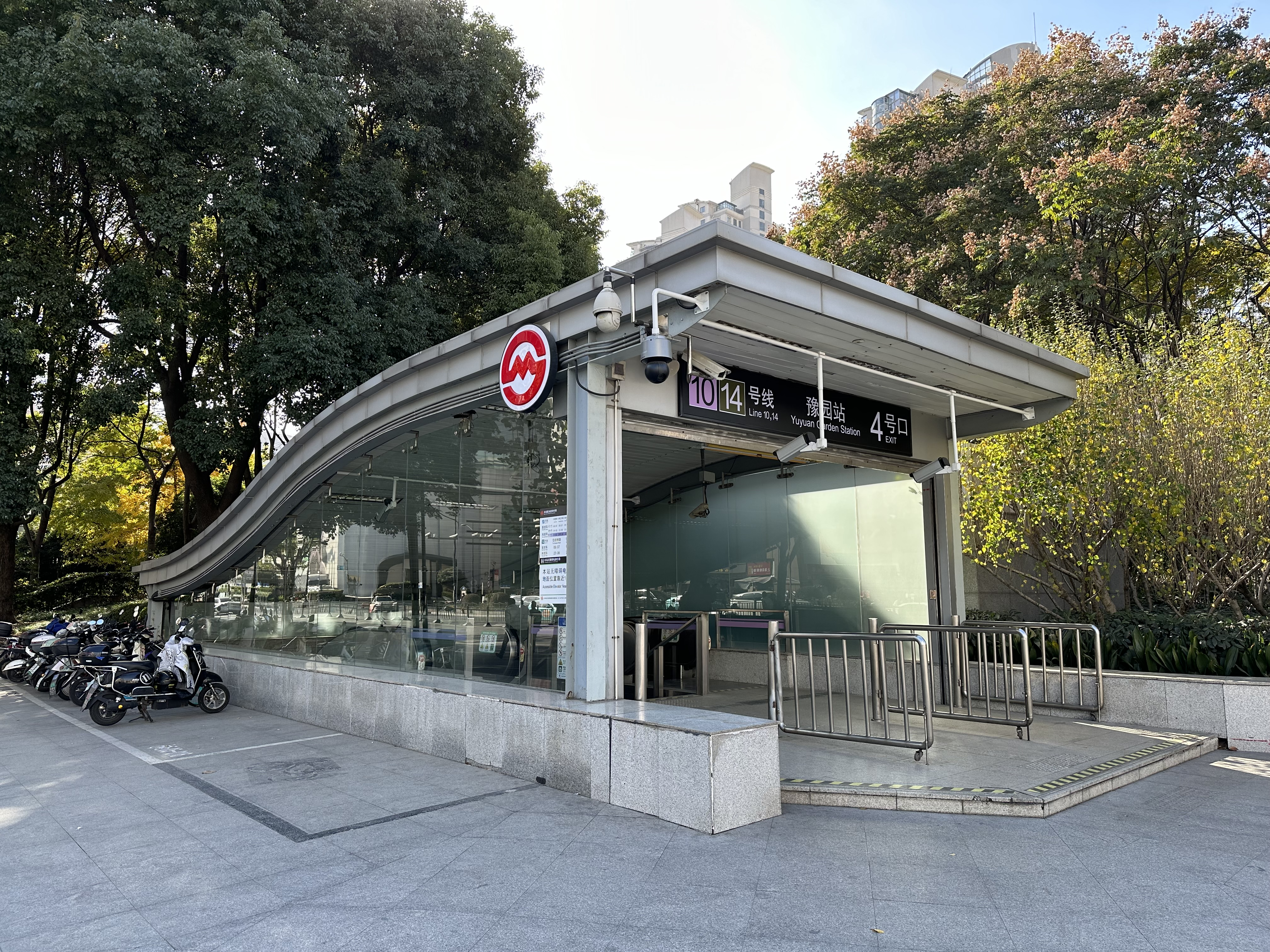
Exit 4

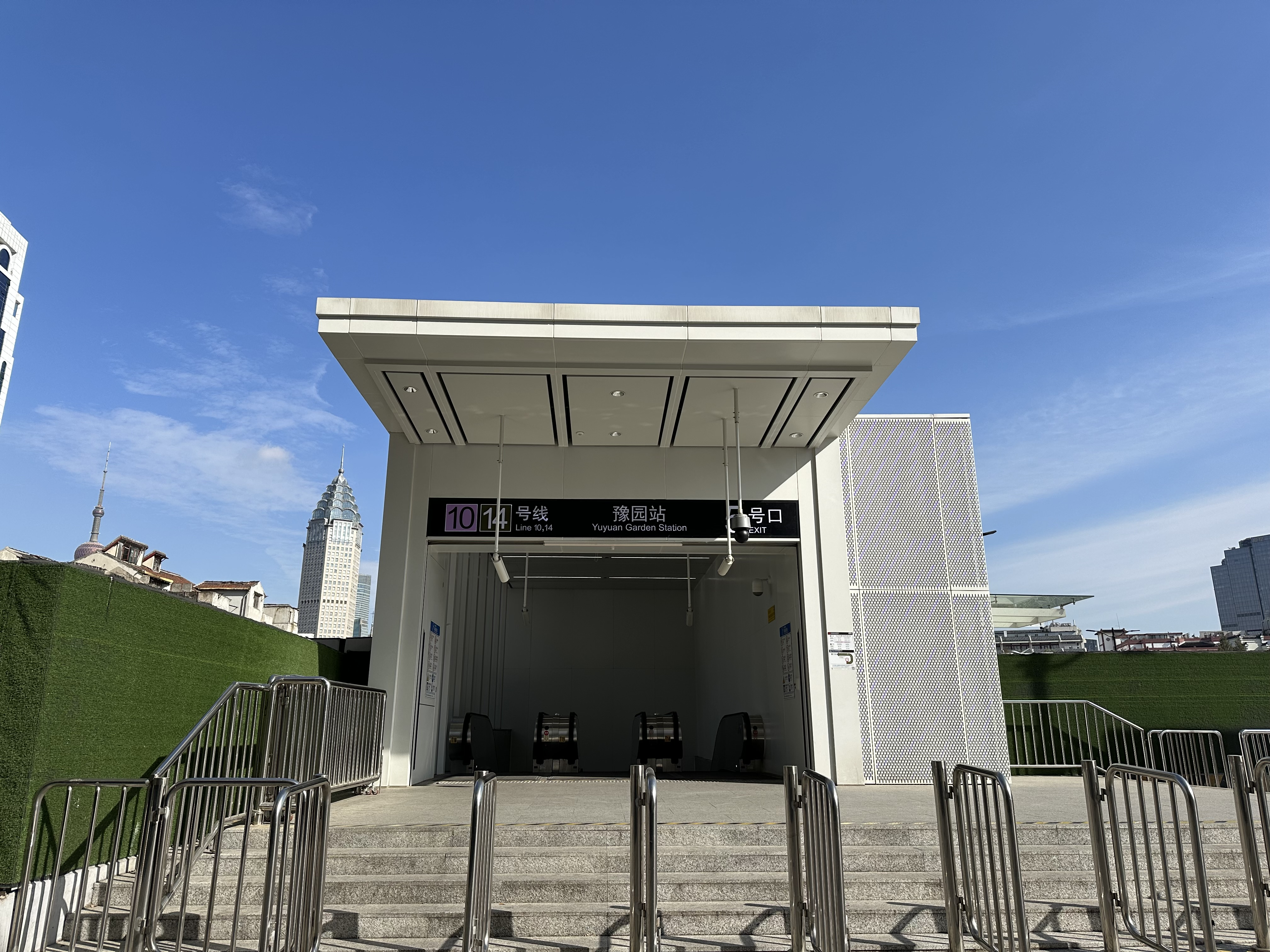
Exit 5

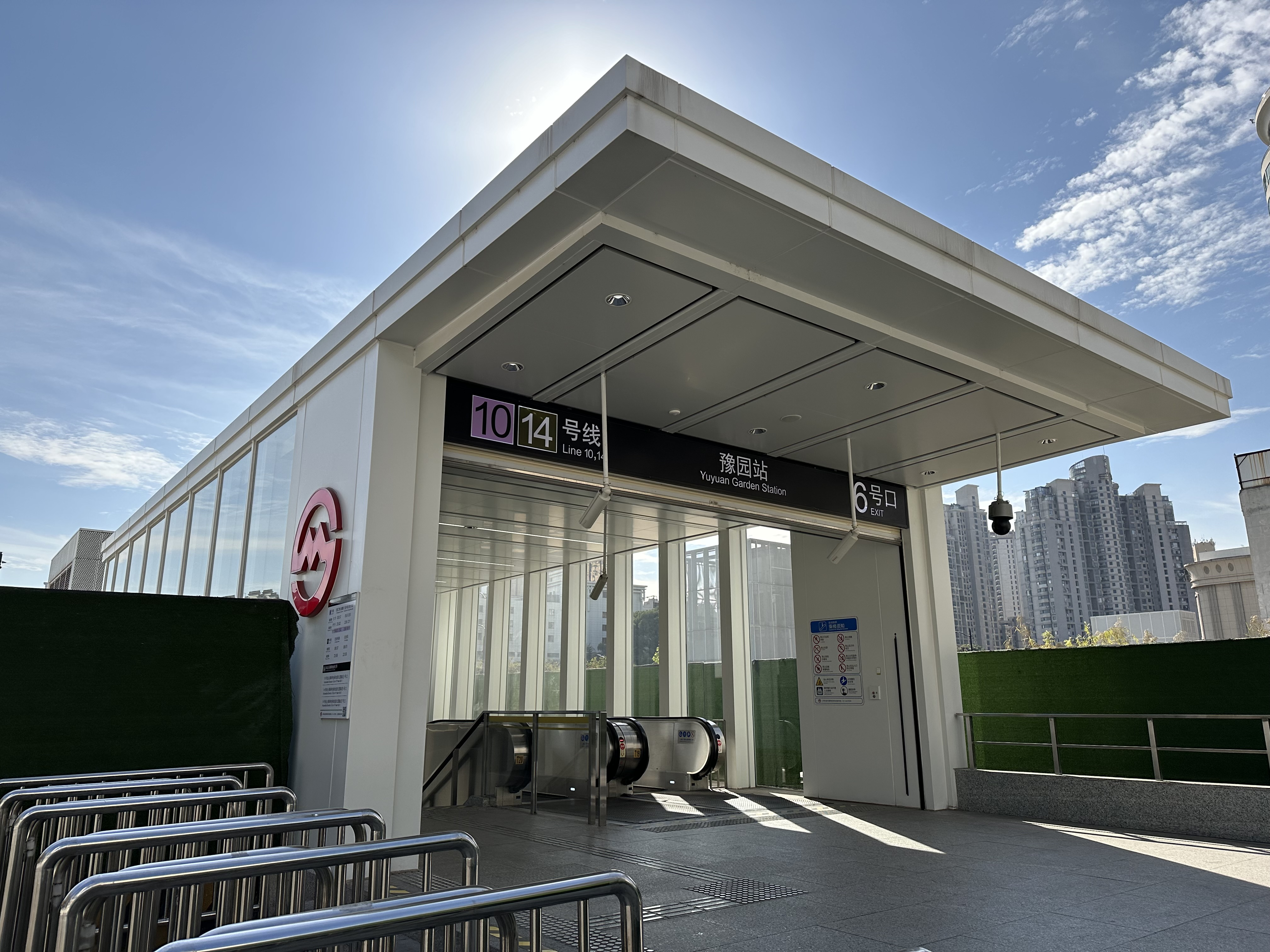
Exit 6

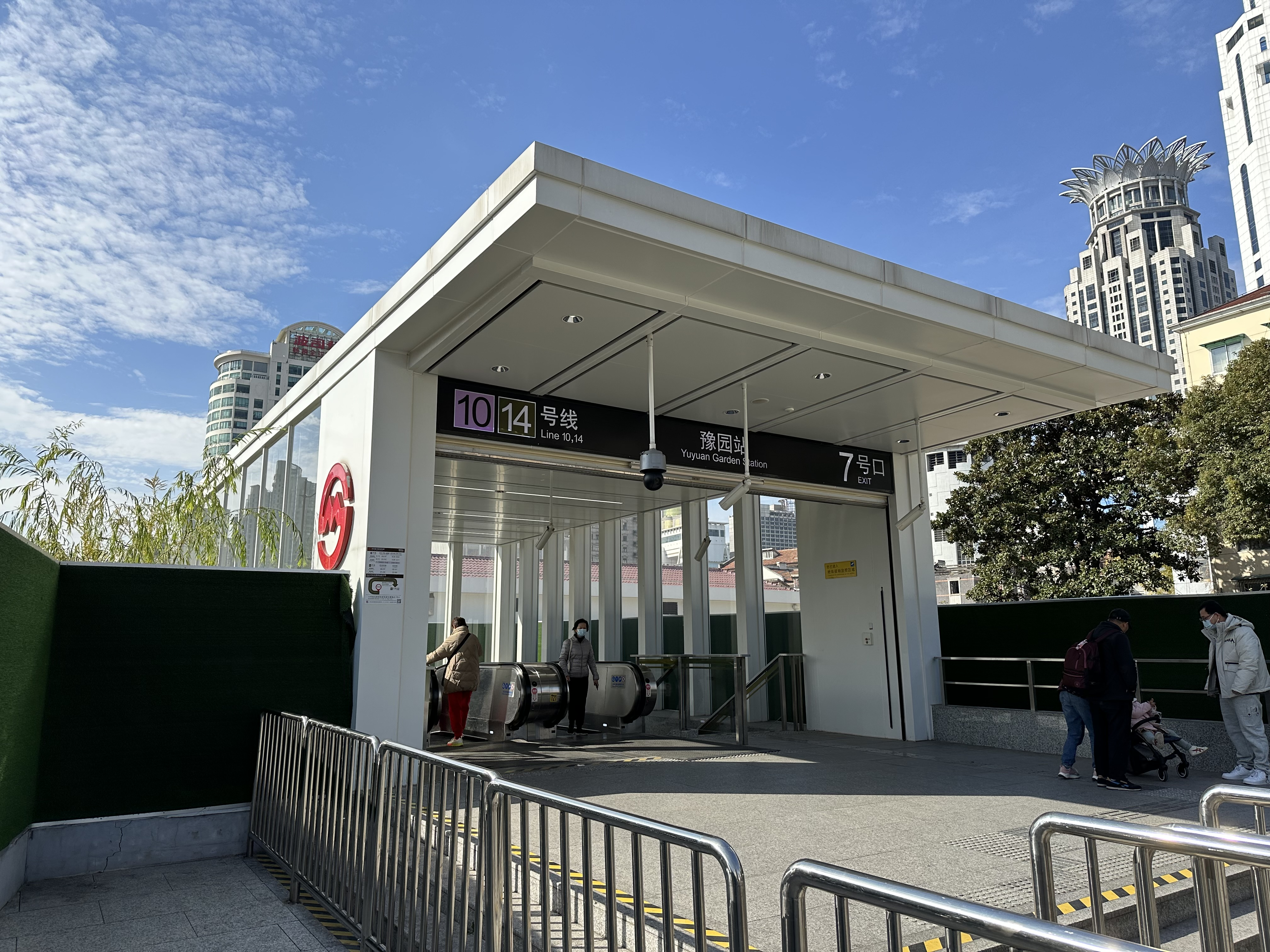
Exit 7

== Nearby Landmarks ==
- Yu Garden
- Shanghai City God Temple
- Gucheng Park
- Shiliupu Dock
- Yanhaimen
- Zhangchuanmen

== Gallery ==
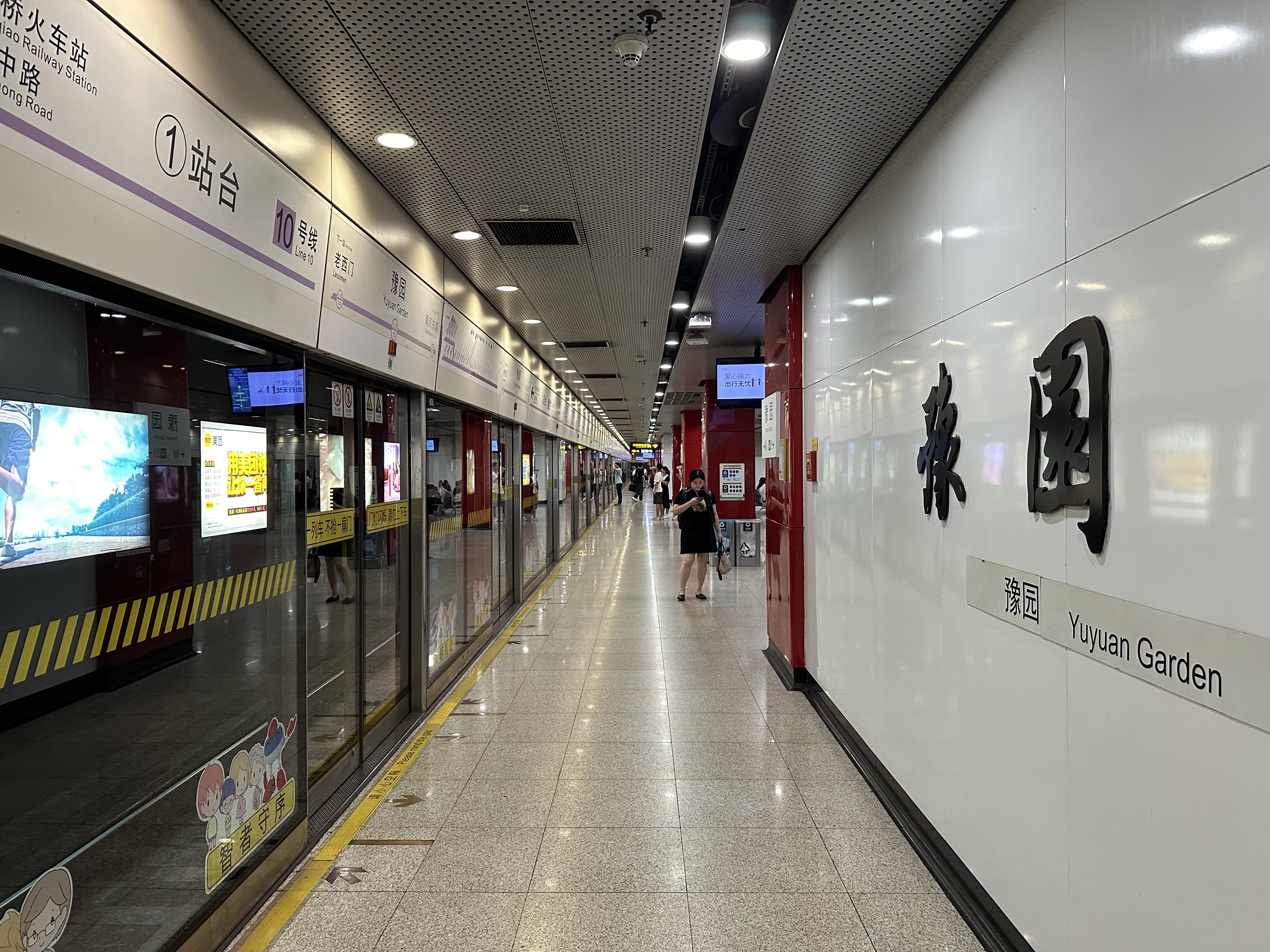
Line 10 Platform

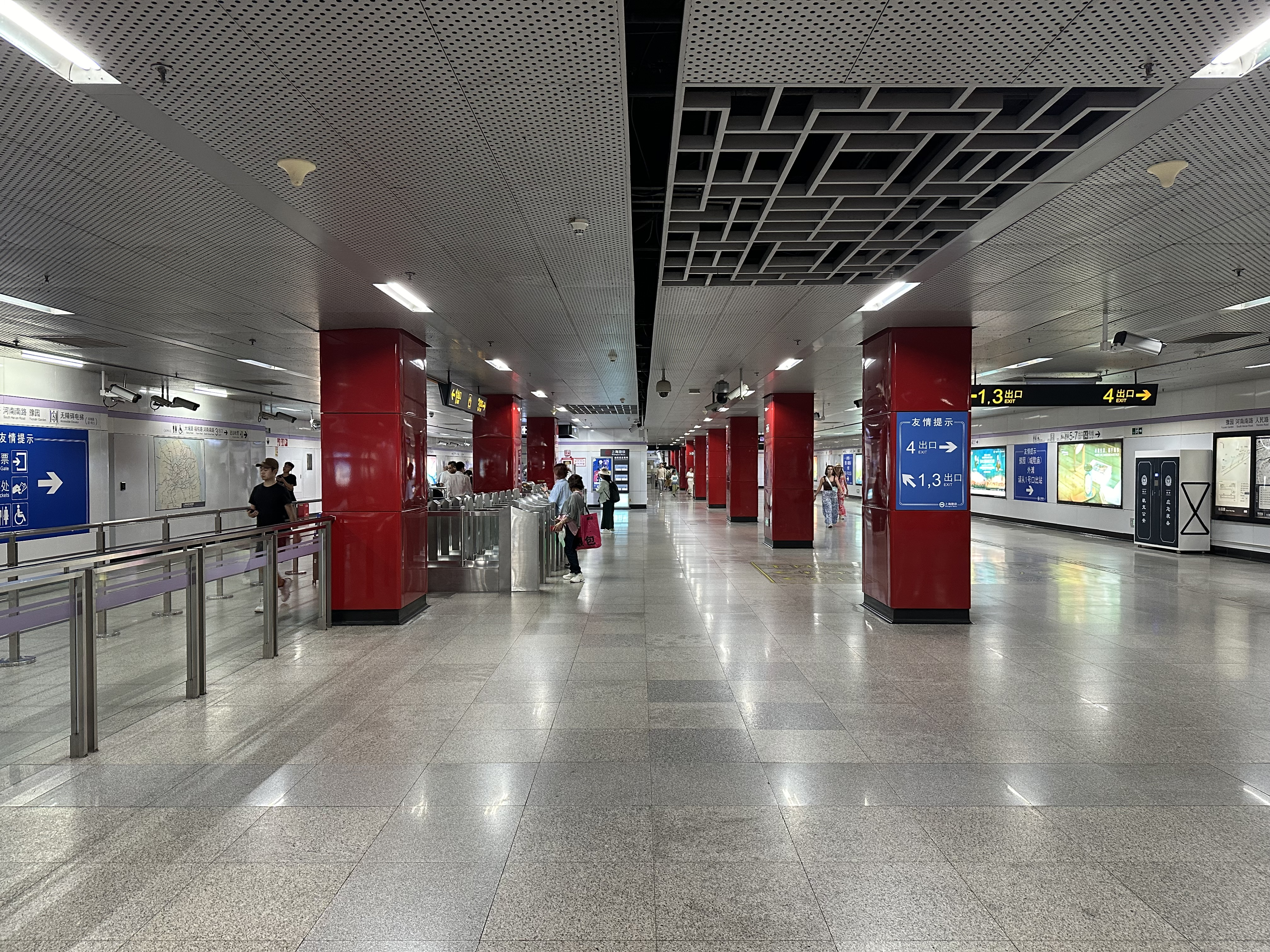
Line 10 Concourse

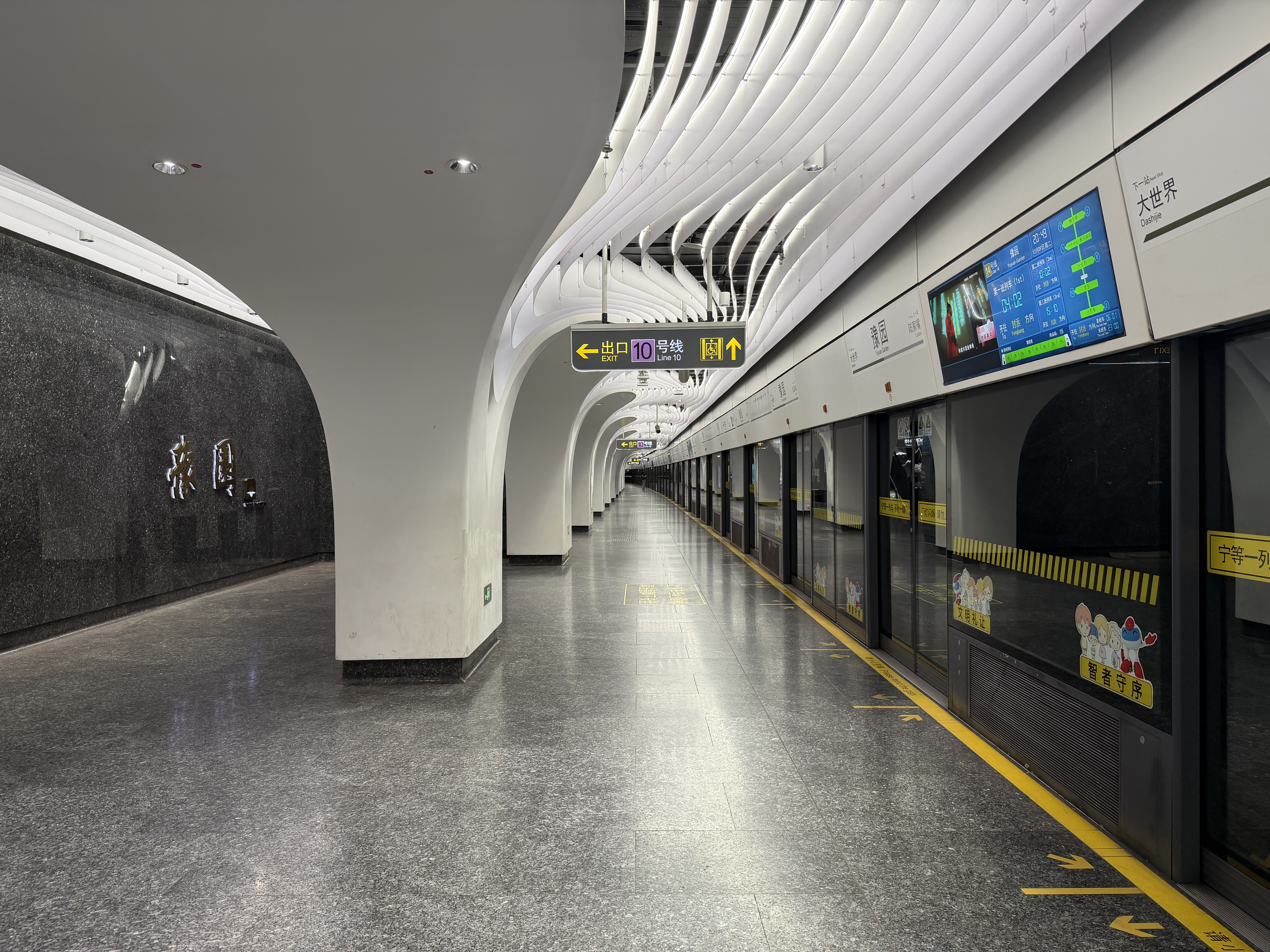
Line 14 Platform

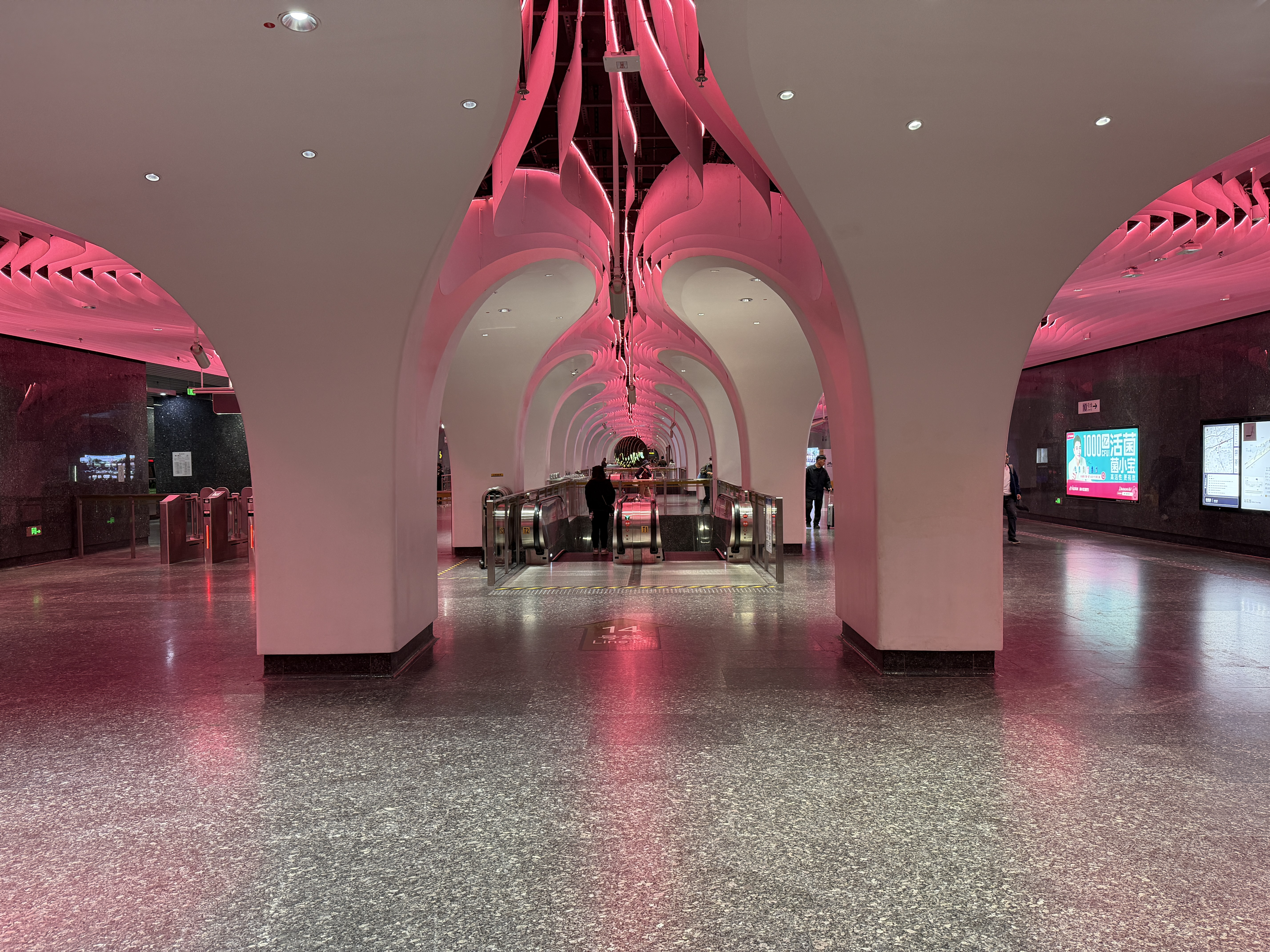
Line 14 Concourse (Magenta Lights)

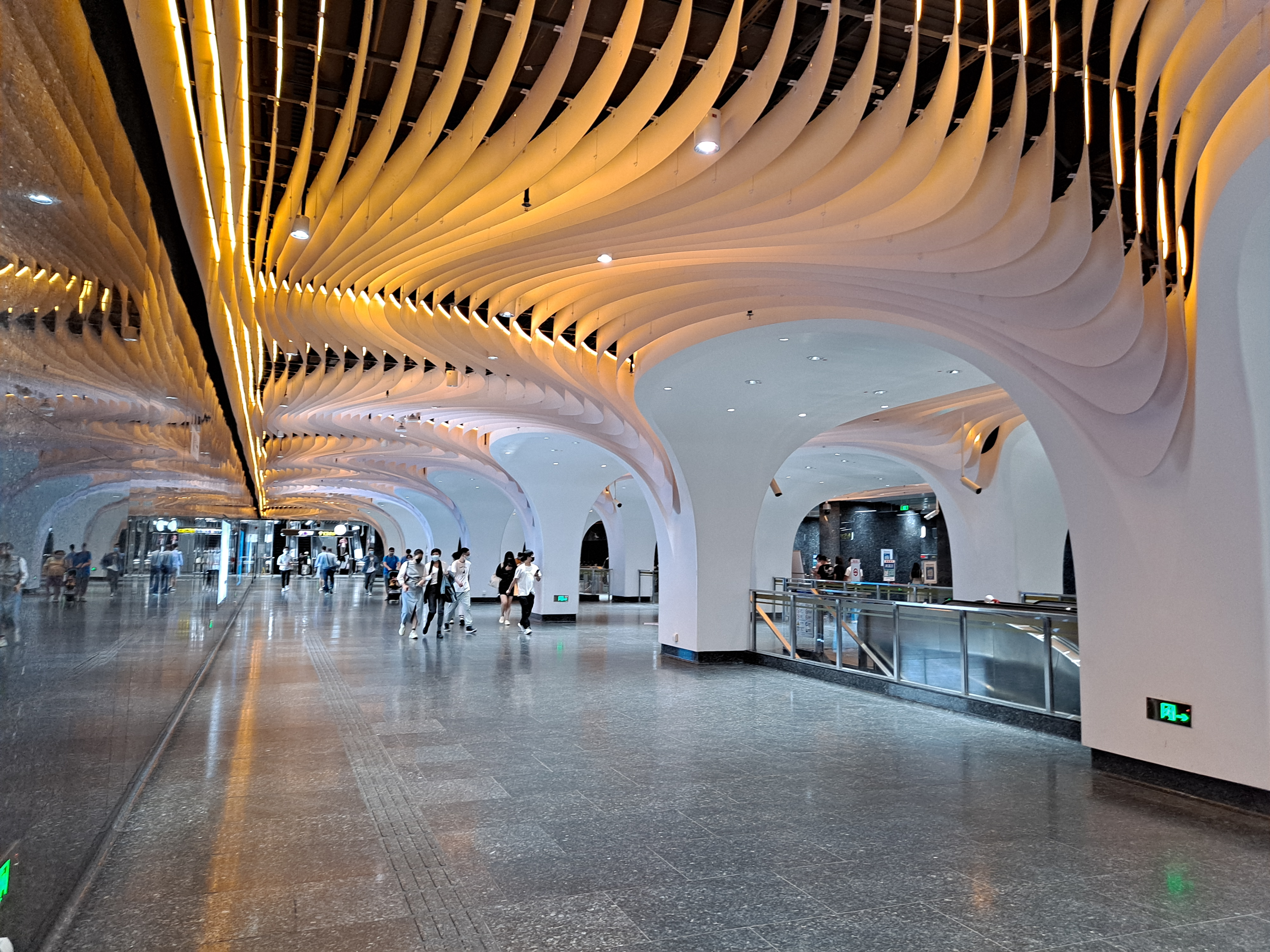
Line 14 Concourse (Orange Lights)

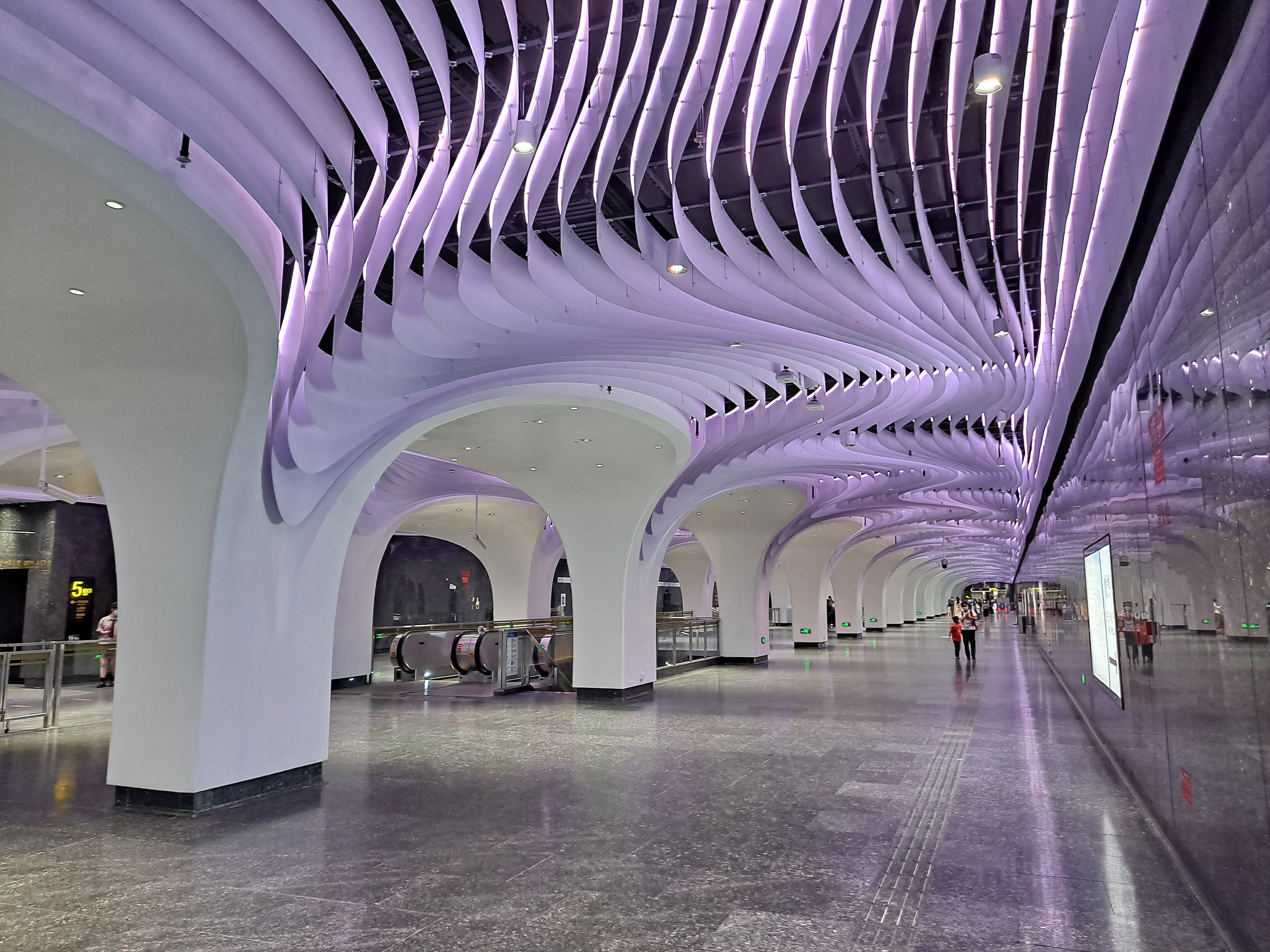
Line 14 Concourse (Purple Lights)

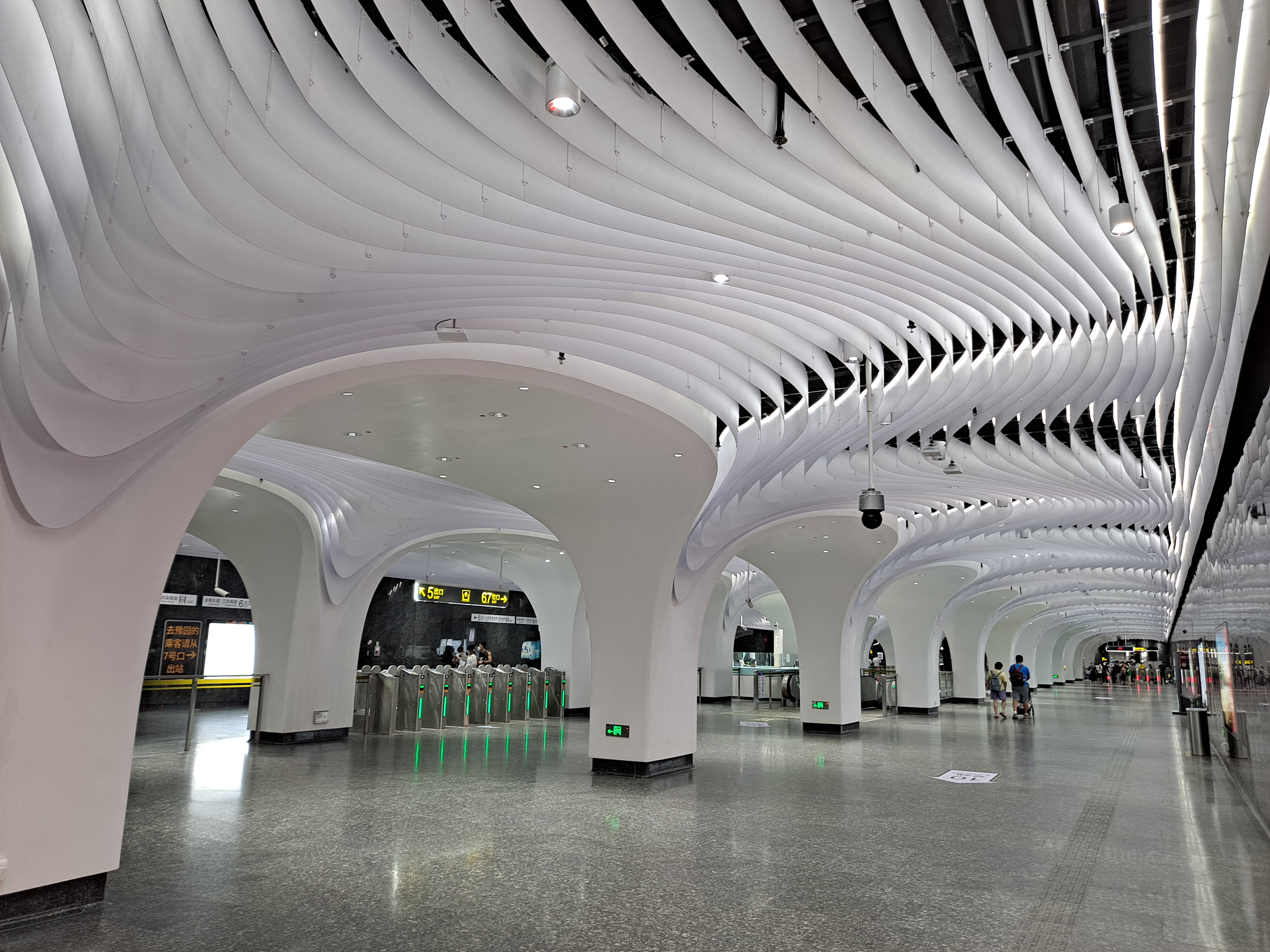
Line 14 Concourse (White Lights)

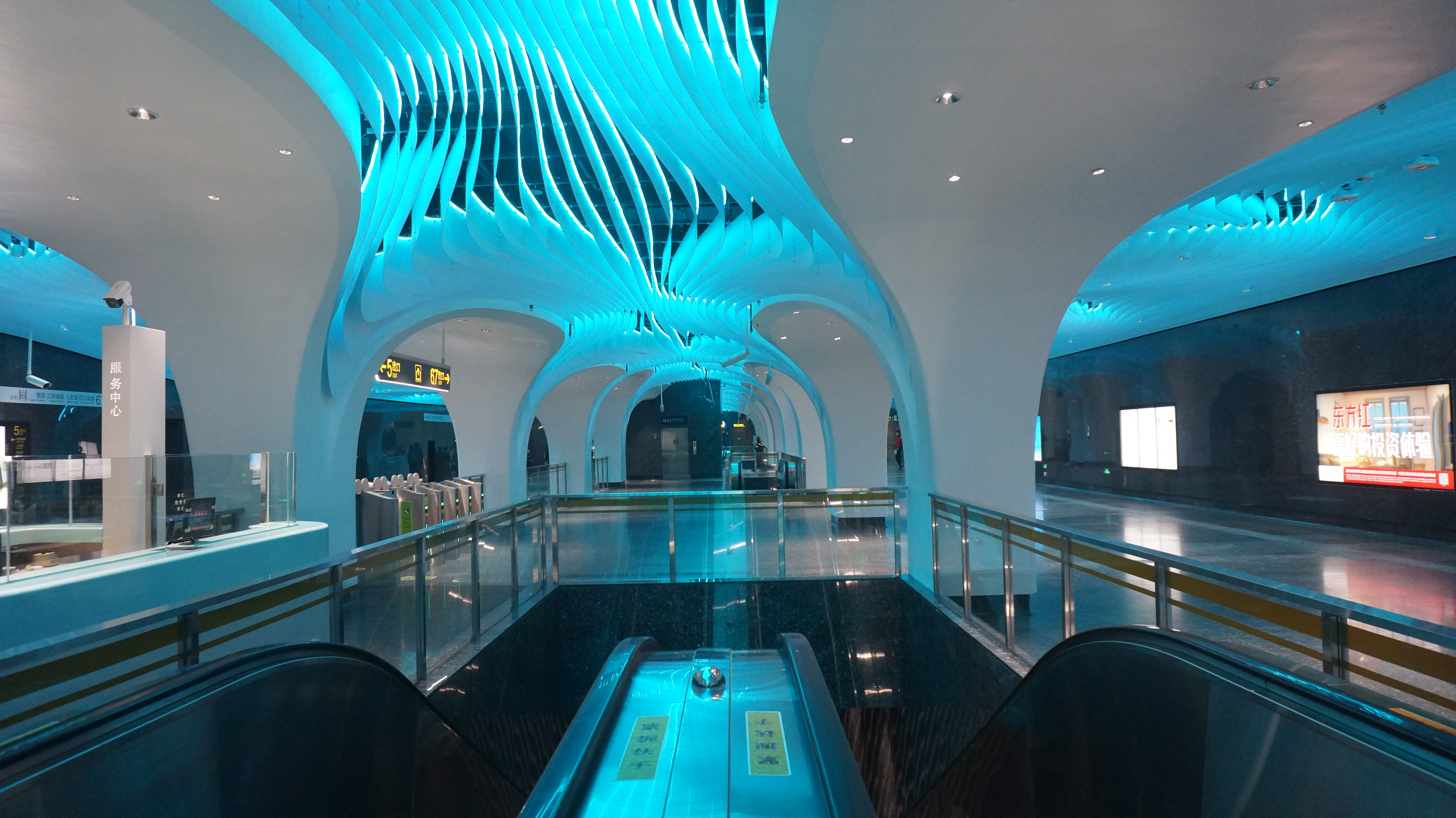
Line 14 Concourse (Blue Lights)

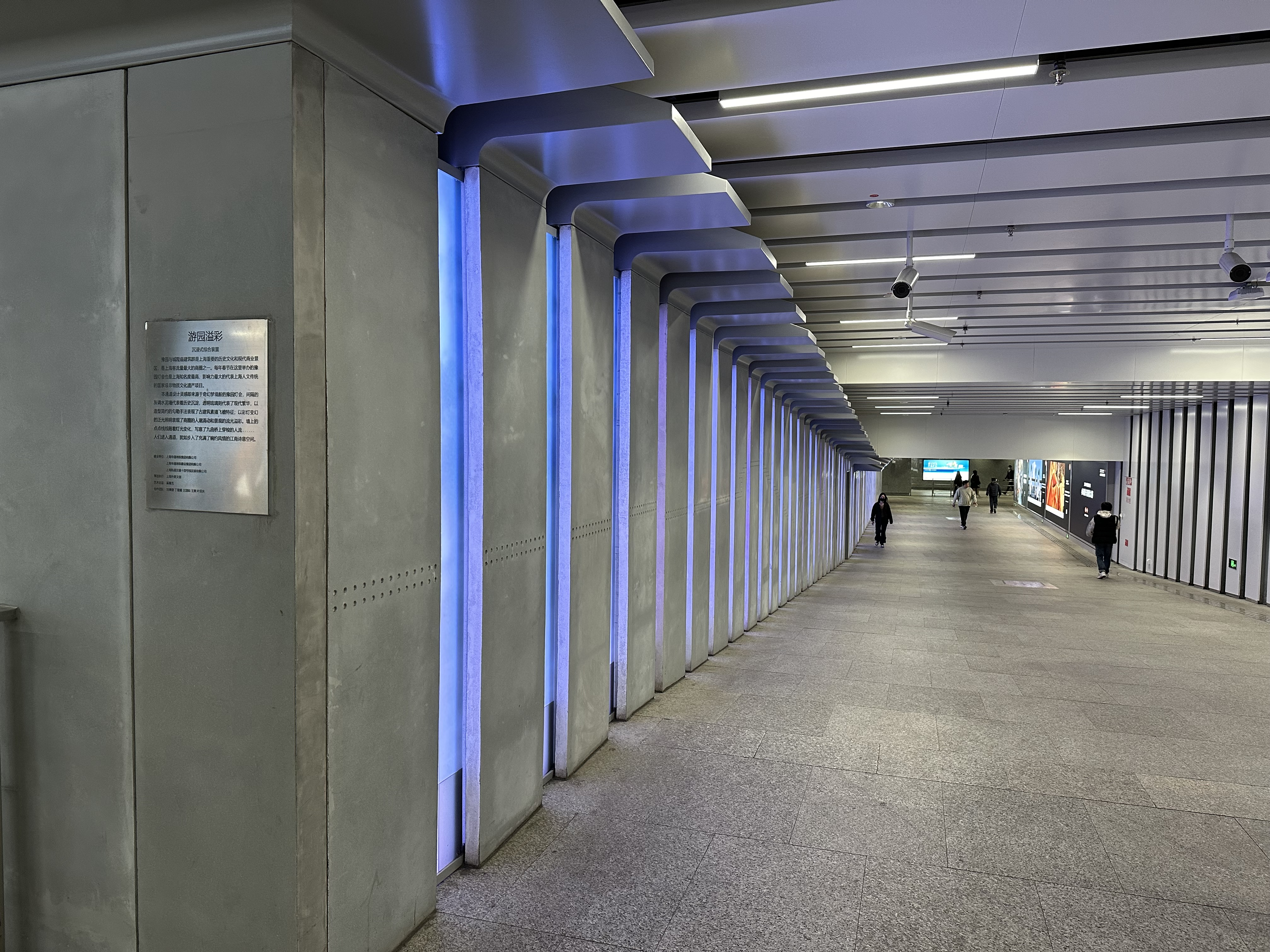
Transfer Concourse

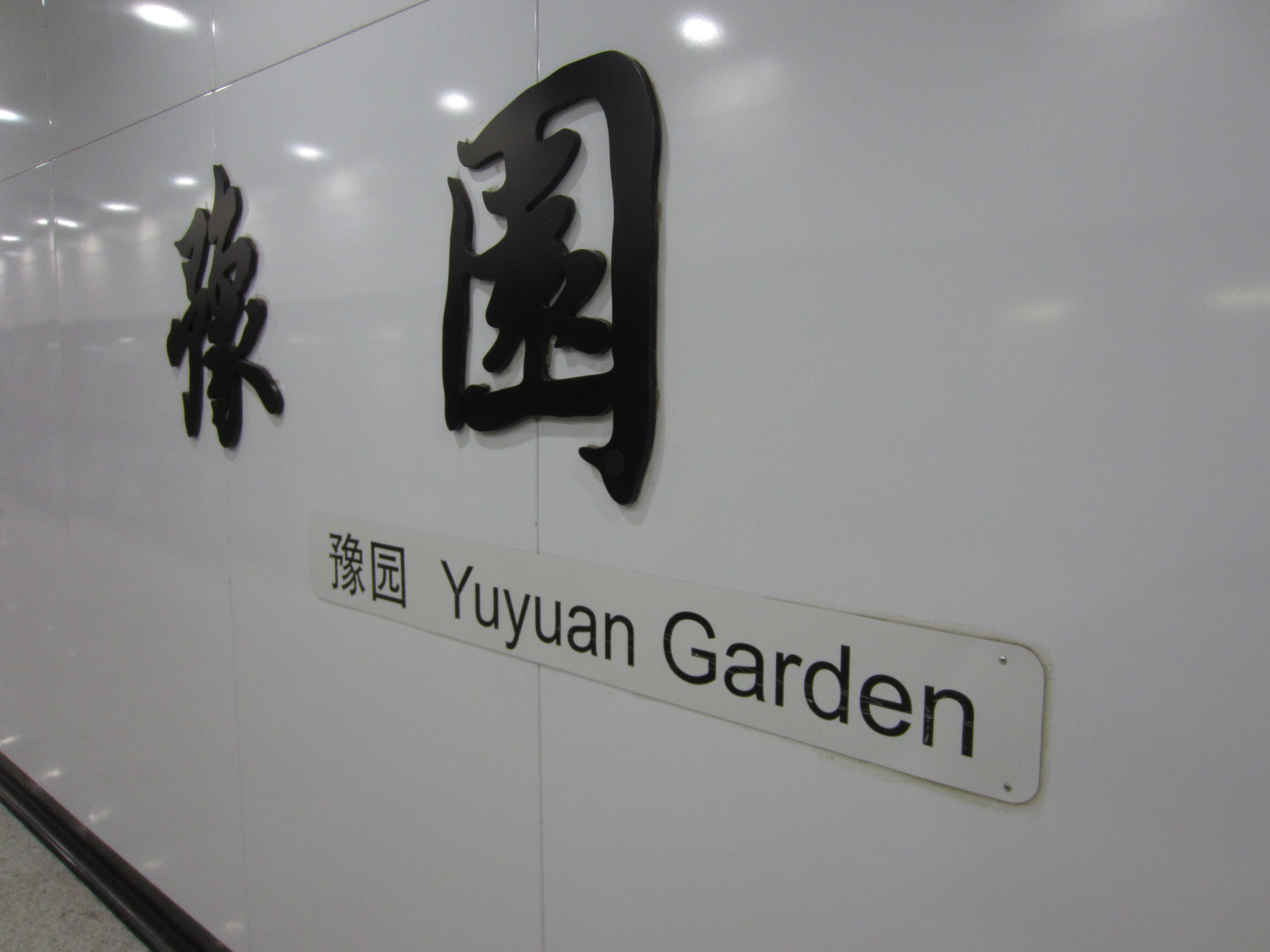
Platform Wall Calligraphy
