= Gucheng Park =

Park in Shanghai, China

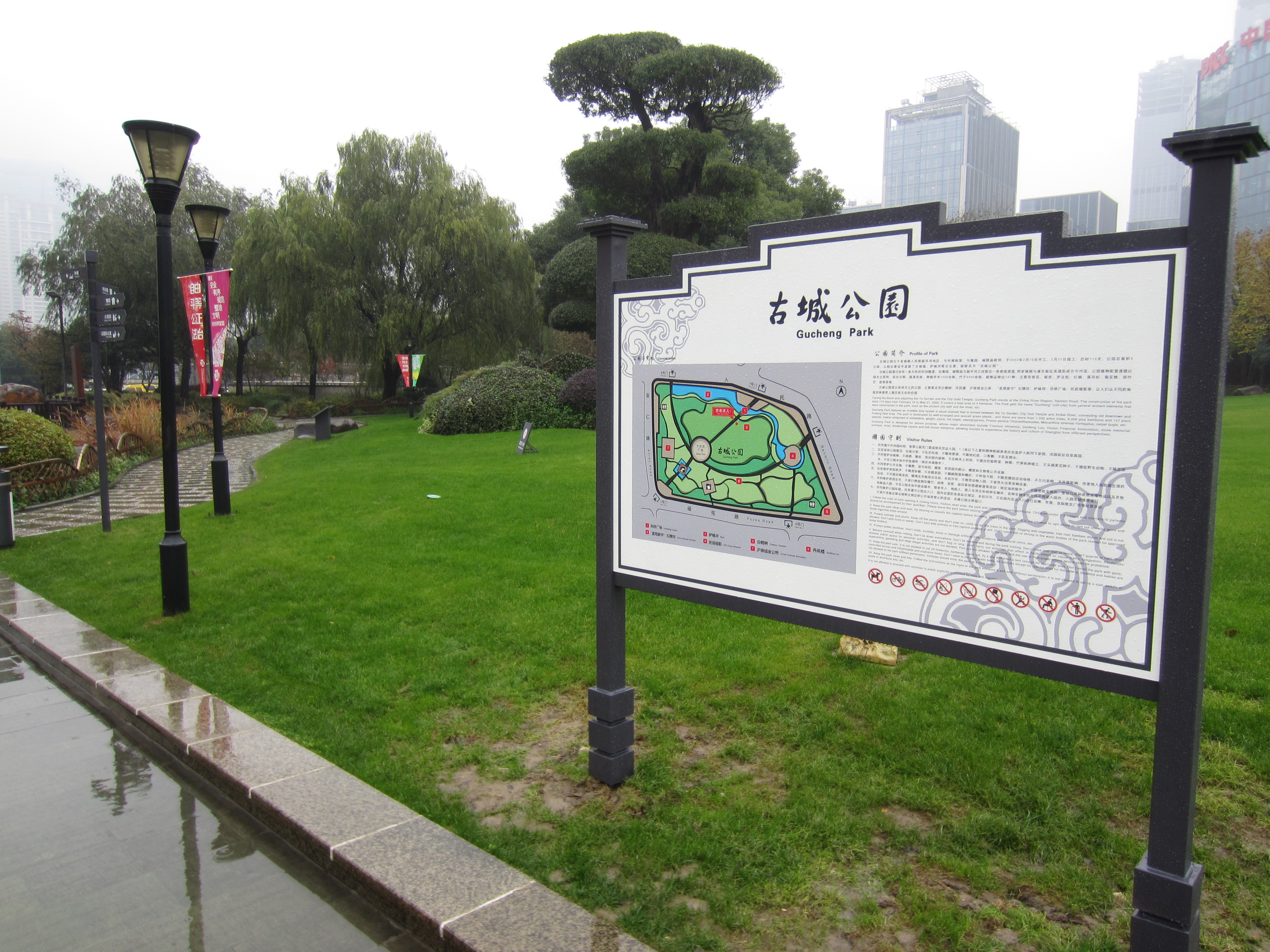
- Park sign, 2015

- Location within Shanghai
- Type: Park
- Location: 333 Renmin Road (by Fuyou Road)
- Nearest city: Shanghai, China
- Coordinates: 31.2285°N 121.4939°E
- Created: 2002

Gucheng Park is a park located at the east end of Renmin Road in Shanghai, China. It was established in 2002. It is known as "Park of the Old City."

== Description ==
It is located in downtown Shanghai's Huangpu District, between Yuyuan Garden and the Bund. It is known as the Park of the Old City due to its location in an area where an old city wall was built. One can take Metro Line 10 or Line 14 to Yuyuan Garden. From Exit 3 there's another 10 minutes' walk.

The park is home to a sunken plaza, a tea-house in a bamboo forest, a fishpond, and a lawn with topiary. An old kitchen in located in the park. After the park was reconstructed, residents living in old shikumen (stone-gate) houses had to relocate. A kitchen from one house was preserved and is now displayed in the park. It features a cement sink, old-style taps and blue-stone floor. There is a small bamboo copse located close to the preserved kitchen. There is an outdoor tea-house located in the park where tables and chairs are surrounded by high trees. The mansion of the South Shanghai Bankers' Club is located close to the tea-house that was built in 1883. It is a dark gray-and-white traditional Chinese-style mansion and is the location where first generation of bankers in Shanghai met. Parts of the old city walls in Shanghai have been reconstructed in Gucheng Park and Danfeng Deck -an observation deck- was built on the original location of Danfeng Tower (a Taoist temple built between 1265 and 1274 which was the highest point in Shanghai a few hundred years back, being demolished in 1912).
