= Children's Palace =

Children's Palace may refer to

- Child World, a toy store company that operated a chain of stores under the name Children's Palace
- Vorontsov's Palace (Odessa), also titled Children's Palace
- Children's Palace (China) (in Chinese: 少年宫), Government-funded recreation centres for minors throughout China
  - Children's Palace station, a station of Shenzhen Metro
  - Shanghai Changning Children's Palace, in Shanghai
- Children's Palace (Ulaanbaatar), in Ulaanbaatar, Mongolia
- Mangyongdae Children's Palace, in Pyongyang, North Korea
- National Youth and Children's Palace, in Tbilisi, Georgia
