= List of outstanding historic buildings of Shanghai =

This list of outstanding historic buildings of Shanghai (Chinese: 上海市优秀历史建筑; pinyin: shànghǎi shì yōuxiù lìshǐ jiànzhú) is a list encompassing 'Outstanding Historical Buildings' of Shanghai, China, nominated by the Shanghai Municipal People's Government starting from 1989. There are currently 5 batches of buildings that have been listed as outstanding historic buildings, where the last of which was nominated in 2015. There are currently 1058 outstanding historic buildings of Shanghai in 17 districts (one former).

== History ==
In 1982, the Shanghai Municipal Bureau of Planning and Natural Resources submitted a draft list of 155 damaged buildings that needed protection to the State Council of the People's Republic of China. In 1985, a plan was drafted, and in 1986, the Shanghai Municipal Commission of Housing and Urban-Rural Construction recorded and recovered documents, including photos, of over 300 outstanding historic buildings.

On November 10, 1988, the Ministry of Housing and Urban-Rural Development and Ministry of Culture confirmed the date that 'Outstanding Near-Modern Historic Buildings' would be from 1840 to 1949.

On January 14, 1989, the Shanghai Municipal Commission of Housing and Urban-Rural Construction in joint with the Shanghai Municipal Administration of Cultural Heritage held meetings with the Shanghai Municipal Bureau of Planning and Natural Resources, Shanghai Municipal Housing Authority, College of Architecture & Urban Planning of Tongji University, Shanghai Urban Construction Design and Research Institute, Shanghai Civil Architecture Design Institute, Shanghai Xian Dai Architectural Design Group, Shanghai Architectural Society etc. to decide 59 'Outstanding Near-Modern Historical Buildings'. On September 25, the Shanghai Municipal People's Government accepted the 59 buildings and listed them as 'Outstanding Near-Modern Historic Buildings', with an additional 2 added on July 14, 1993, making a total of 61 in the first batch.

On March 19, 1993, a second batch of 175 buildings was submitted to the Shanghai Municipal People's Government and was approved on February 15, 1994, to become the second batch of 'Outstanding Near-Modern Historic Buildings'.

On September 28, 1999, a third batch of 162 buildings were listed.

On October 31, 2005, a fourth batch of 234 buildings were listed.

On August 17, 2015, 426 buildings were listed as the fifth batch.

== Number of listed buildings per district ==
Listed buildings per district
District	1st batch	2nd batch	3rd batch	4th batch	5th batch	Total
Huangpu District	32	72	41	62	83	290
Xuhui District	7	48	35	48	115	253
Changning District	7	11	31	47	25	121
Jing'an District	7	25	26	25	62	145
Putuo District		2	5	2	3	12
Zhabei District (former)		1	1	7	5	14
Hongkou District	4	12	11	31	40	98
Yangpu District	3	4	7	12	19	45
Minhang District			1			1
Baoshan District			1		1	2
Jiading District					4	4
Pudong New Area			2		47	49
Jinshan District					3	3
Songjiang District	1				3	4
Qingpu District					13	13
Fengxian District					2	2
Chongming District			1		1	2
Total	61	175	162	234	426	1058

== First Batch ==
Per Shanghai Municipal Government Office Document [1989] No. 62 and Shanghai Municipal Government [1993] No. 47, 61 buildings in total.

Serial Number	Original Name at Completion	Current Name	District	Address	Construction Year	Photo
1	HSBC Building	Pudong Development Bank	Huangpu District	12 Zhongshan East Road	1923	
2	Cathay Hotel	North Building of the Farimont Peace Hotel	Huangpu District	20 Zhongshan East Road	1929	
3	Bank of China	Bank of China Shanghai Branch	Huangpu District	23 Zhongshan East Road	1937	
4	Customs House	Shanghai Customs	Huangpu District	13 Zhongshan East Road	1927	
5	Broadway Mansions	Broadway Mansions	Hongkou District	2 Beisuzhou Road	1934	
6	Shanghai Club	Waldorf Astoria Shanghai on the Bund	Huangpu District	2 Zhongshan East Road	1911	
7	Palace Hotel, Shanghai	South Building of Peace Hotel, Swatch Art Peace Hotel	Huangpu District	19 Zhongshan East Road	1906	
8	Consulate General of the USSR, Shanghai	Consulate General of Russia, Shanghai	Hongkou District	20 Huangpu Road	1917	
9	Park Hotel	Park Hotel	Huangpu District	170 Nanjing West Road	1934	
10	Race Club	ROOF 325	Huangpu District	325 Nanjing West Road	1933	
11	Grand Theatre	Grand Theatre	Huangpu District	216 Nanjing West Road	1933	
12	Hua Qiao Hotel	Pacific Hotel Shanghai	Huangpu District	104 Nanjing West Road	1933	
13	Sincere Department Store	Fashion Company, East Asia Hotel	Huangpu District	690 Nanjing East Road	1917	
14	Old Wing On Department Store	Wing On Department Store	Huangpu District	635 Nanjing East Road	1918	
14	New Wing On Department Store	Seven-Heaven Hotel	Huangpu District	627 Nanjing East Road	1933	
15	Shin Shin Department Store	First Food Store	Huangpu District	720 Nanjing East Road	1925	
16	The Sun, Shanghai	No. 1 Department Store	Huangpu District	830 Nanjing East Road	1934	
17	Cathay Mansions, Shanghai	Jinjiang Hotel; Jinbei Building	Huangpu District	109 Changle Road	1929	
18	The Grosenor House	Jinjiang Hotel VIP Building, Junling Building	Huangpu District	65-125 Maoming South Road	1935	
19	Shanghai International Settlement Council Building	Municipal Engineering Bureau	Huangpu District	153 Hankou Road	1919	
20	Shanghai Municipal Government Building	Sports Academy Office Building	Yangpu District	650 Qingyuan Ring Road	1935	
21	Shanghai Stadium	Shanghai Jiangwan Stadium	Yangpu District	346 Guohe Road	1935	
22	Great World Amusement Park	Great World	Huangpu District	1 Xizang South Road	1924	
23	Shanghai General Post Office	Shanghai Post and Communications Building	Huangpu District	395 Tiantong Road	1922	
24	Hong'en Hospital	Huadong Hospital Cadre Ward Building	Jing'an District	221 Yan'an West Road	1926	
25	Yangshupu Waterworks	Yangshupu Waterworks	Yangpu District	830 Yangshupu Road	1881	
26	St. Ignatius Cathedral, Xujiahui	St. Ignatius Cathedral, Xujiahui	Xuhui District	158 Puxi Road	1910	
27	Basilica of Holy Mary, the Help of Christians, National Shrine of Our Mother in Sheshan	Basilica of Holy Mary, the Help of Christians, National Shrine of Our Mother in Sheshan	Songjiang District	West She Shan	1935	
28	Community Church	Community Church	Xuhui District	58 Hengshan Road	1924	
29	Sir Elly Kadoorie Residence	China Welfare Institute Youth Palace	Jing'an District	64 Yan'an West Road	1924	
30	Sassoon Villa	Dragon Cypress Hotel Building 1	Changning District	2409 Hongqiao Road	1932	
31	79 Fenyang Road Residence	Shanghai Museum of Arts and Crafts	Xuhui District	79 Fenyang Road	1905	
32	Moller Villa	Shanghai Hengshan Moller Villa Hotel	Jing'an District	30 South Shaanxi Road	1936	
33	Sheng Xuanhuai Residence [zh]	Consulate General of Japan	Xuhui District	1517 Middle Huaihai Road	1900	
34	Wang Boqun Residence	Changning Youth Palace	Changning District	31 Lane 1136 Yuyuan Road	1934	
35	45 Fenyang Road Residence	Fenyang Garden Hotel	Xuhui District	45 Fenyang Road	1932	
36	Huayin Road Residence	West Suburban Hotel Building 4	Changning District	200 Huaiyin Road	1948	
37	Cité Bourgogne	Cité Bourgogne	Huangpu District	387 South Shaanxi Road	1930	
38	Xingkang Garden	Xin Kang Garden	Xuhui District	1273 Middle Huaihai Road	1934	
39	The Cloister	Hunan Subdistrict Office	Xuhui District	62 Fuxing West Road	1948	
40	Nanking Theater	Shanghai Concert Hall	Huangpu District	523 East Yan'an Road	1930	
41	Kincheng Bank Building	Bank of Communications	Huangpu District	200 Jiangxi Middle Road	1927	
42	Majestic Theatre, Shanghai	Majestic Cinema	Jing'an District	99 Jiangning Road	1941	
43	Metropol Cinema	Metropolitan Theatre	Huangpu District	520 West Tibet Road	1933	
44	Baxianqiao Church Youth Hostel	Shangyue Youth Hostel Hotel	Huangpu District	123 South Tibet Road	1929	
45	Cosmopolitan Apartments	Huaye Building	Jing'an District	175 North Shaanxi Road	1934	
46	Holy Trinity Church, Shanghai	Holy Trinity Church, Shanghai	Huangpu District	219 Jiujian Road	1869	
47	Sun Ke Residence	Shanghai Institute of Biological Products Office Building	Changning District	1262 Yan'an West Road	1948	
48	Regan Garden	Hainan Real Estate Shanghai Company	Changning District	2310 Hongqiao Road	Early 1940s	
49	Residence at 115 Tai'an Road	Residence at 115 Tai'an Road	Changning District	Lane 115 Tai'an Road	1948	
50	Asia Building	China Pacific Insurance Company Headquarters	Huangpu District	1 Zhongshan East Road	1915	
51	Jardine Matheson Building	Roosevelt Mansion	Huangpu District	27 Zhongshan East Road	1853	
52	Banque de l'Indochine Building	China Everbright Bank Shanghai Branch	Huangpu District	29 Zhongshan East Road	1926	
53	Foreign YMCA Building	Former Foreign YMCA Building	Huangpu District	150 Nanjing West Road	1932	
54	250 Duolun Road Residence	250 Duolun Road Residence	Hongkou District	250 Duolun Road	1924	
55	Bubbling Well Lane	Bubbling Well Lane	Jing'an District	395 Yuyuan Road	1936	
56	New Yuhua Village	Yuhua New Village	Jing'an District	Lane 182 Fumin Road	1938	
57	Hazelwood, Shanghai	Hazelwood Hotel Building 1	Changning District	72 Xingguo Road	1935	
58	Ruijin Road Residence	Ruijin Hotel Building 1	Huangpu District	18 Ruijin 2nd Road	1917	
59	Shangxianfang	Shangxianfang	Huangpu District	350 Huaihai Middle Road Lane	1924	
60	Moore Memorial Church	Moore Memorial Church	Huangpu District	316 West Tibet Road	1930	
61	Cathedral of St Francis Xavier at Tungkiatu	St. Francis Xavier's Church	Huangpu District	185 Dongjiadu Road	1853	

== Second Batch ==
Per Shanghai Municipal Government Office Document [1994] No. 8, 175 in total.

Serial number	Serial Code	Original Name at Completion	Current Name	Address	Construction Year	Photo
1	A-III-050	Oriental Hotel Shanghai	Shanghai Worker's Palace	120 Tibet Middle Road	1929	
2	A-III-038	Metropole Hotel	Metropole Hotel	180 Jiangxi Middle Road	1934	
3	F-III-007	New Asia Hotel	New Asia Hotel	422 Tian Tong Road	1934	
4	A-III-031	American Club	High Court Building	209 Fuzhou Road	1925	
5	C-III-005	French Club	Okura Garden Hotel	58 South Maoming Road	1926	
6	B-III-001	Jewish Club/Huanghe Shoe Store	Chunlan Group/WINDOWS GARAGE	722 Nanjing West Road/702 Nanjing West Road	1911	
7	A-III-024	YWCA Building	ROCKBUND	133 Yuanmingyuan Road	1930	
8	B-III-010	Paramount Ballroom	Paramount Cinema	218 Yuyuan Road	1934	
9	A-III-021	Capitol Theatre	Dawn Theater	146 Huqiu Road	1928	
10	C-III-004	Cathay Theatre	Cathay Cinema	870 Huaihai Middle Road	1932	
11	C-III-006	Lyceum Theatre	Lyceum Theatre	57 South Maoming Road	1931	
12	G-III-003	Former Municipal Museum	Second Military Medical University (Main Building)	174 Changhai Road	1936	
13	F-III-011	Hongkou Fire Station	Hongkou Fire Brigade	560 Wusong Road	1915	
14	G-III-004	Former Shanghai Library	Yangpu Library New Building	181 Heishan Road	1935	
15	D-III-033	Bibliotheca Zi-ka-wei	Xujiahui Branch of Shanghai Library	80 Caoxi North Road	1848	
16	A-III-028	Renji Hospital	Renji Hospital	145 Shandong Middle Road	1937	
17	D-III-034	Zhongshan Hospital	Zhongshan Hospital	136 Medical College Road	1936	Building of Shanghai Zhongshan Hospital
18	F-III-012	Tilanqiao Prison	Tilanqiao Prison	147 Changyang Road	1903	
19	A-III-003	China Merchants Bank Building	China Merchants Bank Building	No. 6 Zhongshan East 1st Road	Before 1893	
20	A-III-007	North China Daily News Building	AIA Building	17 Zhongshan East 1st Road	1924	
21	A-III-022	Building of the Shanghai Chinese Banking Association	Aijian Company	59 Hong Kong Road	1925	
22	A-III-027	Donghai Building (Cishu Building)	Mosaic Plaza	353 East Nanjing Road	1932	
23	A-III-015	Glen Line Building	Shanghai Clearing House	2 Beijing East Road	1922	
24	A-III-049	Union Building	Bank of Shanghai Puxi Branch	261 Sichuan Middle Road	1926	
25	A-III-047	Brunner Mond Building	Shanghai Warehousing Industry Association/Shanghai Commercial Warehousing Co., Ltd.	133 Sichuan Middle Road	1922	
26	A-III-048	New HSBC Building	Shanghai Municipal Government Office	220 Sichuan Middle Road	1928	
27	A-III-029	Zhengguanghe Building	Shanghai Municipal Telegraph Bureau	44 Fuzhou Road	1937	
28	A-III-030	Central Station	Shanghai Municipal Public Security Bureau	185 Fuzhou Road	1933	
29	A-III-037	Hamilton House	Fuzhou Building	170 Jiangxi Middle Road	1933	
30	A-III-032	Robert Dollar Building	Jinjiang Group Financial Company Securities Department; Construction Bank No. 3 Branch Building	51,59 Guangdong Road	1921	
31	A-III-033	Yongnian House	China Minsheng Bank Bund Branch	93 Guangdong Road	1910	
32	A-III-046	Companies House	Entrepreneurial Building	33 Sichuan Middle Road	1920	
33	A-III-020	Guangxue Building	Guangxue Building	128 Huqiu Road	193	
34	A-III-025	American Baptist Bookstore	Zhengguang Building	209 Yuanmingyuan Road	1930	
35	A-III-051	Texas Company Building	Sichuan Building	70 East Yan'an Road	1940	
36	A-III-034	Shun Pao Building	Shun Pao Building	309 Hankou Road	1918	
37	A-III-042	Deutsch-Asiatische Bank	Shanghai Pharmaceutical Industry Co., Ltd.	89 Jiujiang Road	1916	
38	C-III-001	Municipal Administration Council of the Shanghai French Concession	Central Plaza	375 Huaihai Middle Road	1909	
39	A-III-010	Consulate-General of the United Kingdom	No. 1 Bund Source; Patek Philippe	33 Middle Zhongshan East Road 1st Floor; 33 Middle Zhongshan East Road 8th Floor	1849	
40	A-III-026	Jialing Office Building	Jialing Office Building	99 Nanjing East Road	1937	
41	A-III-002	Union Building	Union Building	No. 3 Zhongshan East 1st Road	1916	
42	A-III-041	Continental Bank	Shangtou Building	No. 111 Jiujian Road	1932	
43	A-III-005	Russo-Chinese Bank Building	Central Bank Building	No. 15 Zhongshan East 1st Road	1910	
44	B-III-003	Bank of China West Branch Building	Yates Apartments	No. 801 Nanjing West Road	1936	
45	A-III-008	Chartered Bank Building	Chartered Bank Building	No. 18 Zhongshan East 1st Road	1922	
46	A-III-019	Guohua Bank Building	Sichuan Building	No. 342 Beijing East Road	1933	
47	A-III-004	Great Northern Telegraph Company	Bangkok Bank Shanghai Branch	No. 7 Zhongshan East 1st Road	1907	
48	F-III-009	Bank of China Hongkew Branch	Bank of China Hongkou Branch	No. 894 Sichuan North Road	1932	
49	A-III-009	Yokohama Specie Bank Building	Yokohama Specie Bank Building	No. 24 Zhongshan East 1st Road	1924	
50	A-III-001	Messageries Maritimes Building	Pujiang Rivier Building	No. 9 Zhongshan East 2nd Road	1939	
51	A-III-006	Bank of Taiwan Building	Bank of Taiwan Building	No. 16 Zhongshan East 1st Road	1926	
52	A-III-040	Chekiang First Bank Building	East China Architectural Design and Research Institute	No. 151 Hankou Road	1951	
53	A-III-044	Bank of Mitsubishi Building	Former Bank of Mitsubishi Building	No. 36 Jiujian Road	1936	
54	A-III-043	Mitsui Bank Building	Shanghai Treasury	No. 50 Jiujian Road	1937	
55	A-III-052	Zhonghui Bank Building	Zhonghui Bank Building	No. 16 Henan South Road	1934	
56	A-III-039	Development Building	Development Building	No. 181 Jiangxi Middle Road	1936	
57	A-III-053	Shanghai Cotton Exchange Building	Shanghai Cotton Exchange Building	No. 260 Yan'an East Road	1923	
58	F-III-005	Shanghai Dock & Engineering Company	Shanghai Dock & Engineering Company	No. 378 East Daming Road	1908	
59	D-III-031	Collège Saint Ignace	Shanghai Xuhui High School	No. 50 Hongqiao Road	1917	
60	M-III-006	St. John's University: Administration Hall, Huishi Hall, Siyan Hall, Simeng Hall, Science Hall, West Gate Hall	East China University of Political Science and Law: Principal's Office Building No. 4, Daofen Building No. 41, Student Dormitory No. 40, Student Dormitory No. 43, Office Building No. 42, Dongfeng Building No. 22	No. 1575 Wanhangdu Road	1894, 1904, 1909, 1899, 1924	
61	D-III-015	Nanyang Public School	Jiao Tong University: Main Gate, Gymnasium, School Office Building, Teaching Building, Library	No. 1954 Huashan Road	1898, 1898, 1919	
62	C-III-008	École de France	Shanghai Science Hall Building No. 1	47 Nanchang Road	1917	
63	D-III-020	Shanghai American School	704 Research Centre	10 Hengshan Road	1922	
64	D-III-035	National Shanghai Medical College	Shanghai Medical College, Fudan University	138 Yixueyuan Road	1927	
65	D-III-030	Central Research Institute	Shanghai Institute of Natural Sciences	320 Yueyang Road	1930	
66	F-III-004	The Lester School and Henry Lester Institute of Technical Education	Design Innovation Institute Shanghai	505 East Changzhi Road	1927	
67	B-III-024	Henry Lester Institute of Medical Research and Preventive Medicine	Shanghai Medical Engineering Research Institute	1320 Beijing West Road		
68	B-III-019	American School	Children's Art Theater	643 Huashan Road	1921	
69	A-III-054	Ecole Franco-Chinoise	Middle School of Shanghai Guangming High School|70 Huaihai East Road	1923		
70	M-III-008	McTyeire School	Shanghai No. 3 Girls' High School	155 Jiangsu Road East Building/North Building	1917	
71	C-III-012	Aurora University; Library, Museum	Second Medical University Building No. 12/Institute of Entomology	280 Chongqing South Road, 225 Chongqing South Road	1936, 1930	
72	G-III-002	Hujiang University	Shanghai University of Technology	516 Linyi Road	1906-1917	
73	A-III-045	Saint Joseph's Church	Saint Joseph's Church	36 Sichuan South Road	1860	
74	E-III-003	Qingxin Church	Qingxin Church	30 Dachang Street	1923	
75	F-III-003	Fitch Memorial Church	Fitch Memorial Church	59 Doolun Road	1928	
76	M-III-010	Sieh Yih Chapel	Sieh Yih Chapel	1 Kelu Road	1925	
77	B-III-013	Grace Church	Grace Church	375 Shaanxi North Road	1942	
78	F-III-010	Jinglin Church	Jinglin Church	135 Kunshan Road	1922	
79	E-III-002	Xiaotaoyuan Mosque	Xiaotaoyuan Mosque	52 Xiaotaoyuan Street (Main Building)	1927	
80	N-III-002	Jade Buddha Temple	Jade Buddha Temple	170 Anyuan Road	1918	
81	E-III-001	Huang Nunnery	Cixiu Nunnery	15 Zhenling Street	1869	
82	D-III-041	Cathedral of Our Lady Fatima, Refuge of Sinners	Cathedral of Our Lady Fatima, Refuge of Sinners	55 Xinle Road	1932	
83	C-III-013	Saint Nicholas' Church	Kinloch Coffee	16 Gaolan Road	1932-1934	
84	A-III-035	Jixiangli	Jixiangli	531~541 Henan Middle Road Lane	1876	
85	D-III-017	Jianyeli	Jianyeli	440 Jianguo West Road Lane	1930	
86	B-III-011	Yugu Village	Yugu Village Longtang	361 Yuyuan Road Lane	1927	
87	B-III-005	Jing'an Villa	Jing'an Villa Longtang	1025 Nanjing West Road Lane	1932	
88	B-III-007	Mofan Village	Mofan Village Longtang	877 Yan'an Middle Road Lane	1931	
89	B-III-021	New Jinghua Village	New Jinghua Village	820 Julu Road Lane	1938	
90	B-III-017	Dasheng Hutong	Dasheng Hutong	229~285 Huashan Road Lane	1936	
91	D-III-029	Residence at 200 Yueyang Road	Residence at 200 Yueyang Road	200 Yueyang Road	~1930	
92	C-III-009	Verdun Garden	Changle Village	1~103 Shaanxi South Road Lane	1925	
93	D-III-010	New Zhongnang Village	New Zhongnang Village	1670 Huaihai Middle Road Lane	1941	
94	D-III-018	Yiyuan	Yiyuan	506 Jianguo West Road Lane	1941	
95	C-III-010	King Albert Apartments	Shannan Village	151~187 Shaanxi South Road	1930	
96	D-III-025	New Yongjia Village	New Yongjia Village	580 Yongjia Road Lane	1947	
97	D-III-026	New Yongkang Village	New Yongkang Village	109, 175 Yongkang Road Lane	1931	
98	D-III-004	Shafa Garden	Shangfang Garden	1285 Huaihai Middle Road Lane	1939	
99	D-III-008	Yi Village	Yi Village	1610 Huaihai Middle Road Lane	1942	
100	M-III-007	Weile Garden	Weile Garden	120 Taian Road Lane	1924	
101	C-III-011	Sinan Mansions	Sinan Mansions	51~95 Sinan Road	1920-1930	
102	B-III-008	Residences	Residences	931~979 Middle Yan'an Road	~1930	
103	D-III-024	Residence at 501 Yongjia Road	Veteran Cadres University, Activity Centre	501 Yongjia Road	1928	
104	D-III-028	Residence at 145 Yueyang Road	Retired Cadres Bureau	145 Yueyang Road	1928	
105	D-III-007	Residence at 1469 Huiaihai Middle Road	Consulate General of the United States	1469 Huaihai Middle Road	1921	
106	D-III-023	Residence at 151 Yongfu Road	Consulate General of Germany	151 Yongfu Road	1935	
107	D-III-036	Zhengguanghe Mansion	Zhengguanghe Mansion	99 Wukang Road	1935 (1900)	
108	D-III-014	Residence at 893 Huashan Road	All-China Federation of Industry and Commerce Shanghai	893 Huashan Road	1930	
109	D-III-013	Lilac Garden	Lilac Garden	849 Huashan Road Main Building	1862	
110	D-III-006	Residence at 1431 Huaihai Middle Road	Consulate General of France	1431 Huaihai Middle Road	1921	
111	B-III-006	Guo Brothers Building	Shanghai Foreign Affairs Office	1418 Nanjing West Road	1926	
112	D-III-027	Residence at 110 Yueyang Road	103 Institute	110 Yueyang Road	1930	
113	B-III-015	Wu Tongwen Residence	City Planning Institute	333 Tongren Road	1937	
114	B-III-016	Pei Mansion	Pei Mansion	1301 Beijing West Road	1939	
115	D-III-039	Zhu Mintang Residence	Zhu Mintang Residence	151 Urumqi South Road	1927	
116	D-III-001	Du Yuesheng Mansion	East Lake Hotel Building No. 7	1110 Huaihai Middle Road	1934	
117	D-III-038	Libo Garden	Libo Garden	87 Wuxing Road	1928	
118	D-III-019	Wang Shixin Residence	Consulate General of Poland	618 Jianguo West Road	1948	
119	M-III-005	Residence at 127 Wuyi Road	Consulate General of Belgium	127 Wuyi Road	1932	
120	M-III-001	Residence at No 1, 185 Xinhua Road	Anhui Provincial Office in Shanghai	No. 1, 185 Xinhua Road	1930	
121	M-III-002	Residence at 315 Xinhua Road	Shanghai First Business Bureau Convalescent Home	315 Xinhua Road	1930	
122	M-III-003	Residence at No. 17, 329 Xinhua Road	Residence at No. 17, 329 Xinhua Road	No. 17, 329 Xinhua Road	1930	
123	M-III-009	Residence at 2275 Hongqiao Road	People's Armed Police Shanghai Headquarters	2275 Hongqiao Road	~1930	Demolished
124	B-III-025	Yan Tongchun Residence	City Instrument Bureau	816 Middle Yan'an Road	1933	
125	M-III-011	Residence at 754 Yuyuan Road	Residence at 754 Yuyuan Road	754 Yuyuan Road	1931	
126	D-III-045	Customs Club	Former Customs Club	No. 3, 9 Fenyang Road	1898	
127	B-III-023	Wangde Lane	Wangde Lane	No. 2, 1220 Beijing West Road	1930	
128	B-III-022	Eddington House	Changde Apartment	195 Changde Road	1936	
129	F-III-002	Riverside Building	Riverside Apartments	340 Beisuzhou Road	1935	
130	B-III-004	Medhurst Apartments	Taixing Building	934 Nanjing West Road	1933	
131	C-III-002	Bearn Apartments	Bearn Apartments	449 Huaihai Middle Road	1923	
132	B-III-002	Denis Apartmetns	Denis Apartments	778 Nanjing West Road	1928	
133	M-III-004	West Park Mansions	West Park Mansions	1396 Yuyuan Road	1912	
134	C-III-007	Astrid Apartments	Nanchang Building	143 Maoming South Road	1933	
135	D-III-012	I.S.S. Normandie Apartment	Wukang Mansion	1842~1858 Huaihai Middle Road	1924	
136	D-III-016	Dauphine Apartments	Jianguo Apartment	394 Jianguo West Road	1935	
137	D-III-021	Washington Apartments	Xihu Apartment	303 Hengshan Road	1928	
138	D-III-044	Clement Apartments	Yumen Apartments	Lane 1363 Fuxing Middle Road	1929	
139	B-III-020	Brookside Apartments	Brookside Apartments	731 Huashan Road	1931	
140	D-III-002	Hanray Apartments	Huaizhong Apartments	1160~1164 Huaihai Middle Road	1939	
141	D-III-003	Gascogne Apartments	Huaihai Apartments	1202 Huaihai Middle Road	1935	
142	D-III-042	Amyron Apartments	Gao'an Apartment	14 Gao'an Road		
143	B-III-018	Haig Court	Jing'an Hotel	370 Huashan Road	1934	
144	D-III-022	I.S.S. Picardie Apartments	Hengshan Picardie Hotel	534 Hengshan Road	1935	
145	D-III-043	Willow Court	Weile Apartments	34 West Fuxing Road	1934	
146	D-III-040	Liberty Apartments	Liberty Apartments	258 Wuyuan Road	1933	
147	D-III-037	Midget Apartments	Midget Apartments	115 Wukang Road	1931	
148	D-III-005	Empire Mansions	Huaihai Building	1300~1326 Huaihai Middle Road	1931	
149	F-III-08	Sihang Building	Sihang Building	1274 Sichuan North Road	1932	
150	C-III-003	Yongye Building	Yongye Building	481 Huaihai Middle Road	1932	
151	D-III-047	Savoy Apartments	Ruihua Apartments	209 Changshu Road	1928 (initiated)	
152	D-III-046	Chiang Kai-Shek Residence	Shanghai Music School Attached Building A, Building B	9 Dongping Road	1927	
153	D-III-009	Residence at 1634 Huaihai Middle Road	Shanghai Science and Technology Institute	1634 Huaihai Middle Road	1930	
154	B-III-012	Chen Bingqian Residence	Shanghai Second Industrial University Shaanxi North Road Campus	80 Shaanxi North Road	1900	Partial demolition of portion along the street in 1994
155	C-III-014	Jiangnan Machinery Manufacturing Bureau	Jiangnan Shipyard	2 Kaohsiung Road	1865	
156	G-III-001	Yangshupu Power Plant	Yangshupu Power Plant	2800 Yangshupu Road (Tin Workshop)	1913	
157	H-III-001	Sihang Warehouse	Sihang Warehouse	1 Guangfu Road	1935	
158	A-III-012	Waibaidu Bridge	Waibaidu Bridge	Zhongshan East First Road	1907	
159	A-III-011	Gutzlaff Signal Tower	The Bund History Museum	1 Zhongshan East Second Road A	1907	
160	A-III-014	Sichuan Road Bridge	Sichuan Road Bridge	Sichuan Middle Road	1923	
161	A-III-018	Abraham & Co. Building	Abraham & Co. Building	31-91 Beijing East Road	1911	
162	F-III-006	Gaoyang Building	Gaoyang Building	817 East Daming Road	1915	
163	B-III-014	Ohel Rachel Synagogue	Ohel Rachel Synagogue	500 Shaanxi North Road	1920	
164	D-III-011	Residence at 1754 Lane Huaihai Middle Road	Residence at 1754 Lane Huaihai Middle Road	1754 Lane Huaihai Middle Road	1930	
165	D-III-048	The Gubbay House on the Route de Grouchy	Shanghai Tongji University Pulmonary Hospital Yanqing Road Outpatient Department	130 Yanqing Road	1928	
166	N-III-001	Central Mint	Shanghai Mint	17 Guangfu West Road	1920	
167	A-III-013	Zhapu Road Bridge	Zhapu Road Bridge	Zhapu Road	1927	
168	F-III-001	Consulate General of Japan	Former Consulate General of Japan	106 Huangpu Road (Red Building)	1911	
168	F-III-001	United Nations Relief and Rehabilitation Administration	Huangpu Hotel	106 Huangpu Road (Grey Building)	1944	
169	D-III-032	Xujiahui Notre-Dame	Xujiahui Notre-Dame	45 Caoxi North Road	1929	
170	A-III-036	Carlowitz & Co. Building	Carlowitz & Co. Building	255 Jiangxi Middle Road	1898	
171	A-III-023	Ampere & Co.	ROCKBUND	97 Yuanmingyuan Road	1907	
172	A-III-055	Mitsui & Co.	Watch Factory No. 7 Office Building	175 Sichuan Middle Road	1937	
173	B-III-009	Italian Club	上海意大利总会	238 Yan'an West Road	1925	
174	A-III-016	Gibb, Livingston & Co. Building	Gibb, Livingston & Co. Building	100 Dianchi Road	1908	
175	A-III-017	Yeguang Real Estate Company Building	Yeguang Real Estate Company Building	120 Dianchi Road	1908	
