= Grand Pacific Hotel =

Grand Pacific Hotel may refer to:

== Australia ==
- Lorne Grand Pacific Hotel, a hotel in the Australian town of Lorne, Victoria

== Fiji ==
- Grand Pacific Hotel (Fiji)

== United States ==
(by state)

- Grand Pacific Hotel (Chicago), Illinois
- Grand Pacific Hotel (Missoula, Montana), listed on the National Register of Historic Places (NRHP) in Missoula County, Montana
- Grand Pacific Hotel (Olmsted Falls, Ohio), listed on the NRHP in Cuyahoga County, Ohio
- Grand Pacific Hotel (San Diego), part of the Gaslamp Quarter Historic District
- Grand Pacific Hotel (Seattle), NRHP-listed

== See also ==
- Hotel Grand Pacific
- Pacific Hotel (disambiguation)
