= Pacific Hotel =

Pacific Hotel may refer to:

- Pacific Hotel Shanghai, formerly the Hua Qiao Hotel
- Pacific Hotel (Colorado), part of the Como Roundhouse, Railroad Depot and Hotel Complex
- Pacific Hotel (Seattle), a 112 unit affordable housing apartment building in what was the Leamington Hotel & Apartments building designed by Julian F. Everett

== See also ==
- Grand Pacific Hotel (disambiguation)
