= Blackstone Apartments (Shanghai) =

- 黑石公寓
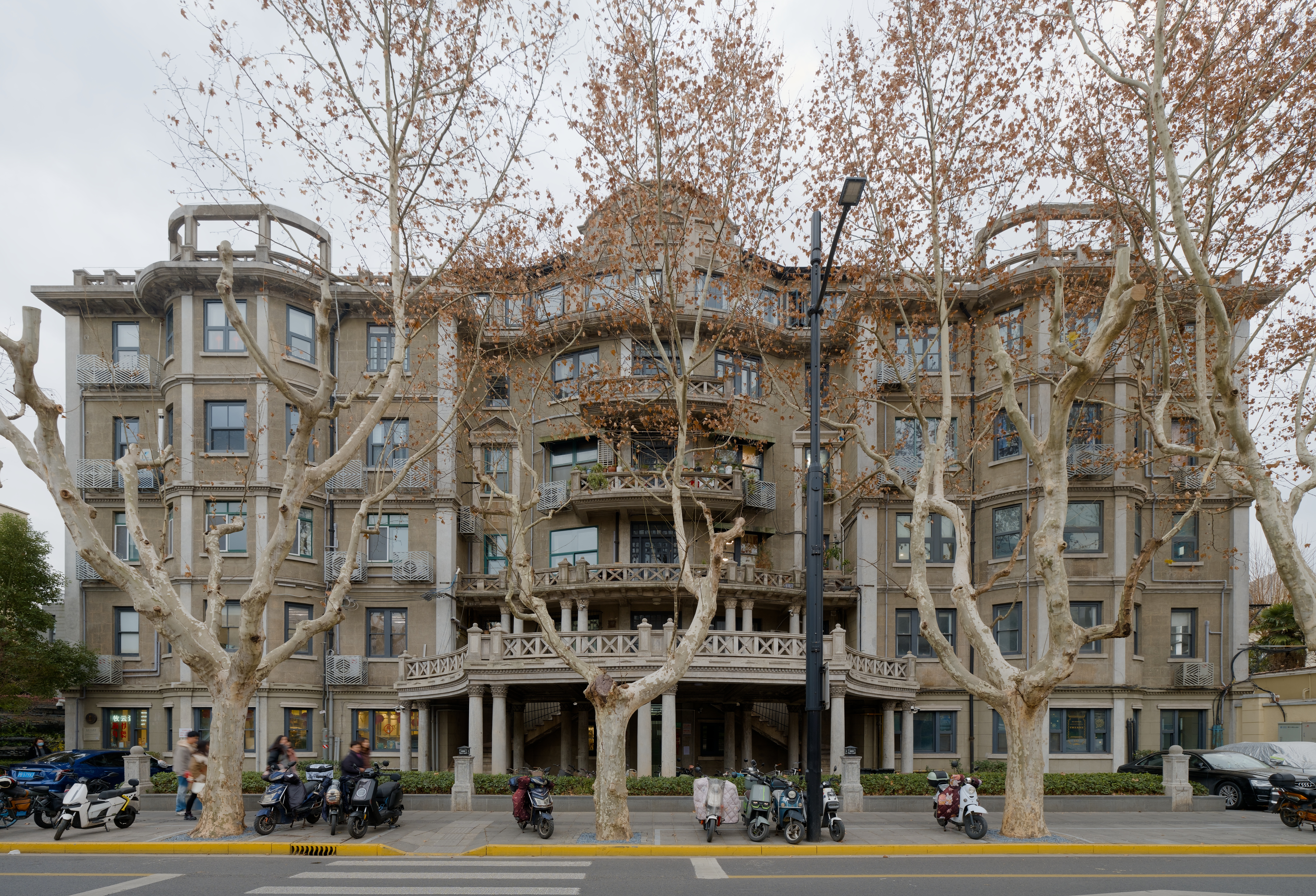
- Interactive map of the Blackstone Apartments area
- Former names: Fuxing Apartments

General information
- Type: Apartment
- Architectural style: Baroque
- Location: Xuhui District, Shanghai, 1331 Fuxing Middle Road, People's Republic of China
- Coordinates: 31.2045°N 121.4383°E
- Inaugurated: 1924

Height
- Height: 30 m (98 ft)

Technical details
- Floor count: 6
- Floor area: 4,977 m^{2} (53,570 sq ft)

The Blackstone Apartments or Fuxing Apartments (Chinese: 黑石公寓) are the first purpose-built luxury apartments for expatriates in Shanghai, China. Built in 1924, the four-storey building is created from imported concrete and stones from the UK, giving it a dark appearance.

The Blackstone Apartments is a protected historic apartment building in the former French Concession area of Shanghai. It was completed in 1924. The building was the first purpose-built apartment building for expatriates in this location.

== Location ==
The building is located in the centre of Fuxing Middle Road (formerly Route LaFayette), on the corner with Fenyang Road, in Shanghai's Xuhui District. It is in the central part of the former French Concession area of the city.

== Architecture ==
Completed in 1924, the six-storey building is the oldest Baroque apartment building in Shanghai. Using imported British concrete with the use of black stones, the symmetrical facade has a large ornamental awning at the front with Double Corinthian Columns. The building originally had a large garden and communal swimming pool in the building.

== History ==
The building served as private residences up until after World War II, when it was converted into the office for the United Nations Relief and Rehabilitation Administration. A previous tenant from 1946 to 1947, Betty Barr Wang, describes the building as follows:

“What I enjoyed most about the year at the Blackstone was the large garden at the back. Along one wall was a bamboo grove and I remember spending many hours there with my young teenage friends, most of whom were American. Our neighbors in the apartment building were both foreign and Chinese and I presume that the rents must have been high in those post-war years.”

== See also ==
- List of historic buildings in Shanghai
