= Fuzhou Road =

Street in Shanghai, China

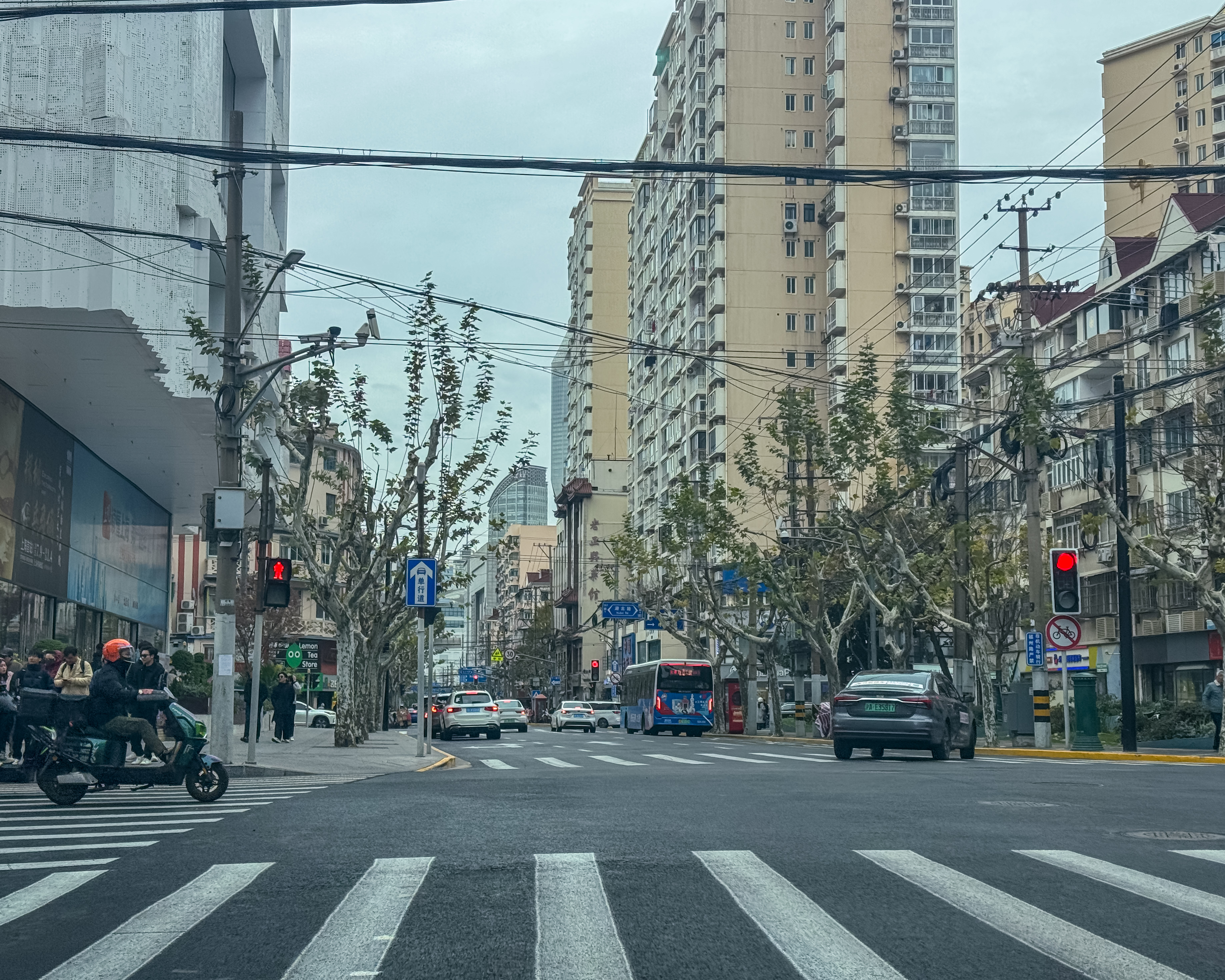
- Fuzhou Road at the intersection with Middle Fujian Road in 2025
- Native name: 福州路 (Chinese)
- Former name: Foochow Road
- Length: 1,453 m (4,767 ft)
- Location: Huangpu, Shanghai
- From: East No.1 Zhongshan Road
- To: Middle Xizang Road

Fuzhou Road (Chinese: 福州路; pinyin: Fúzhōu Lù; Wade–Giles: Fu^{2}chou^{1} Lu^{4}), previously anglicized as Foochow Road, is a street in the Huangpu district of Shanghai. Built in the 1850s and extended several times through 1864, the 1,453-metre (4,767 ft) one-way street connects East No.1 Zhongshan Road with Middle Xizang Road. Fuzhou Road has historically been a center of the publication and book sale industries in Shanghai, though it is also home to theatres, museums, and restaurants. Historically, it was also a site of teahouses, opium dens, and brothels.

== Description ==
Fuzhou Road is located in the Huangpu district of Shanghai. It runs 1,453 metres (4,767 ft) southwest from East No.1 Zhongshan Road, which follows the Huangpu River, to Middle Xizang Road, parallel to the Nanjing, Jiujiang and Hankou Roads. Fuzhou Road is named after the Chinese city Fuzhou; the roads in the area are all named after Chinese cities, organized north to south. As of 2025, it is a one-way street.

== History ==
Fuzhou Road was constructed in the 1850s, shortly after the opening of Shanghai as a treaty port. In its initial iteration, it extended only to the Henan Road intersection. By 1856 it considered one of the best roads in the city, having been surfaced with chips of granite and extended to Hubei Road. Fuzhou was extended to what is now Xizang Middle Road in 1864. Initially named Mission Road, after the London Missionary Society, it gained its current name – originally anglicized Foochow Road – in 1865 after the government implemented a standardized naming scheme in which all roads would be named after Chinese cities.

=== Shanghai International Settlement ===
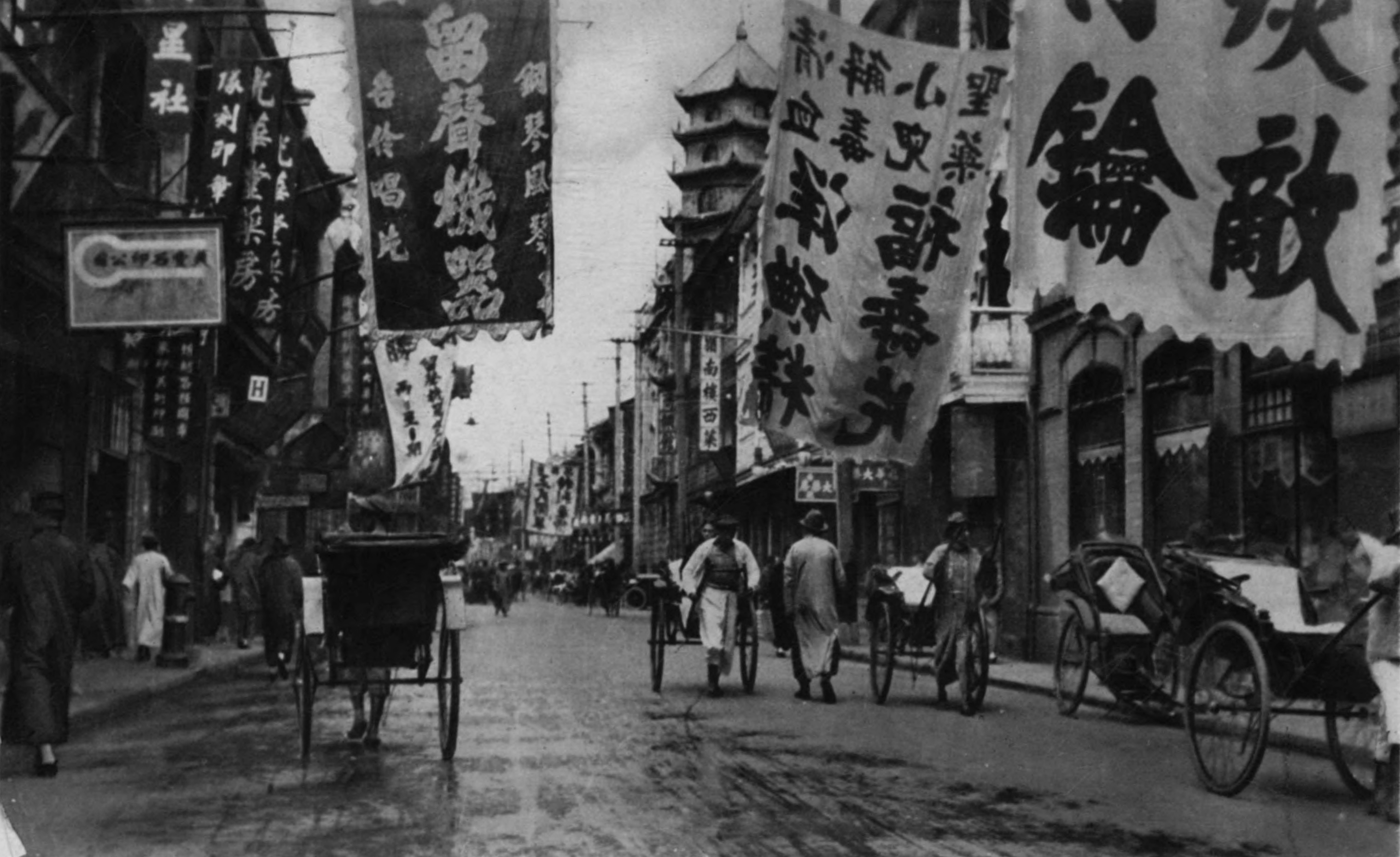
Fuzhou Road in 1927

As the Shanghai port expanded and the French Concession and International Settlement developed, Fuzhou Road became a popular location for shops selling both Chinese- and foreign-language publications. Consequently, through the middle of the 20th century, Fuzhou Road and the surrounding area gained a reputation for literary products, being the location of various bookstores, stationary shops, and publication houses. At its peak, the road was home to more than 300 bookstores, as well as dozens of newspapers and hundreds of magazines; it was thus the center of the publication industry in the country.

Such publication companies extended to the alleyways connected to Fuzhou Road, with Wangping Street (now Shandong Road M.) becoming popularly known as "Newspaper Road" because it housed the headquarters of some 51 periodicals. Major publications headquartered on Fuzhou Road included the North China Herald (later renamed the North China Daily News), which moved to new offices on the Bund in 1901, as well as the Shen Bao and Xinwen Bao. Major bookstores included the Zhonghua, World, and Great East Bookstores, the largest such shops in Shanghai, as well as the San Lian Bookshop. The Commercial Press, a major publisher, was headquartered on the road.

Located along Fuzhou Road was the Tianchan Theatre, one of the largest in Shanghai. Other venues included the Yipinxiang Dance Hall and the Dangui First Stage. Fuzhou Road was also the location of numerous Chinese restaurants, including the Cantonese-style Hang Fa Lau and the Beijing-style Da Ya Loo. At various times, the road was home to brothels, teahouses, and opium dens. The Hui Le Li, for instance, had more than a hundred and fifty sing-song girls at its peak, and for a time prostitutes could also be found at teahouses, theatres, and restaurants. Fuzhou was a common destination for Shanghai's writers.

In the 1900s, several administrative buildings were also located on Fuzhou Road, serving the needs of the International Settlement. This included the American Club, designed by Laszlo Hudec and built in 1924, that housed the American Chamber of Commerce as well as the LaSalle Extension University. Other administrative buildings included the Central Police Station and the Shanghai Volunteer Corps. By 1933, the road was fully electrified, and the nighttime lights were a popular attraction. Construction on the steel-frame Capital Hotel, later renamed the Metropole Hotel, began in 1934; this art deco edifice reaches a height of 50 metres (160 ft).

=== Modern history ===
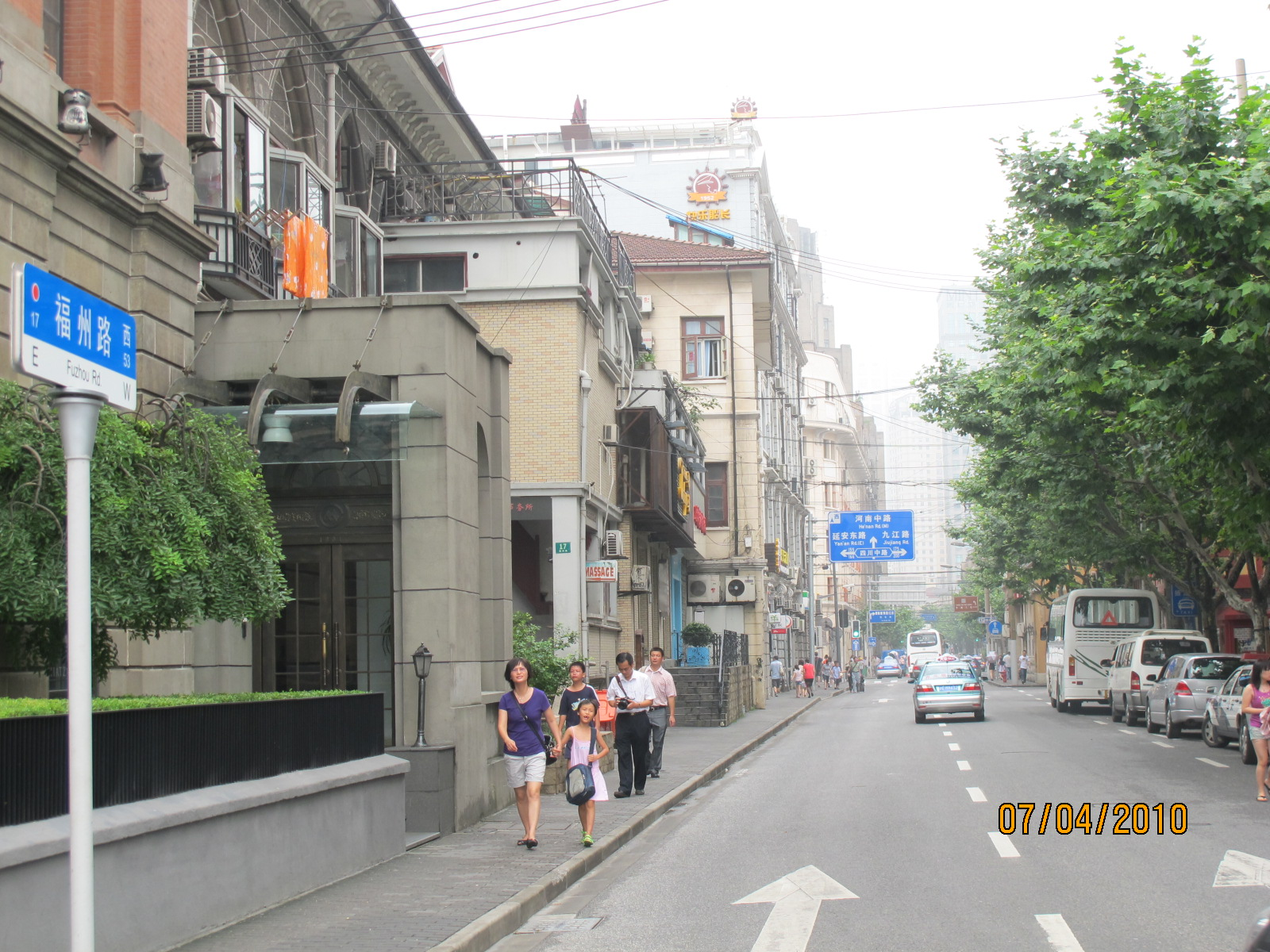
Fuzhou Road in 2010

Efforts were made to clean Fuzhou Road, with opium and prostitution banned, and major rejuvenation efforts were implemented by the Huangpu District government in the 1990s. Through the 20th century, new bookstores continued to be opened along Fuzhou Road. These included the Ancient Books Shop, opened in 1956, which carries book rare books as well as works on diverse subjects. In 1998, the 10,000-square-metre (110,000 sq ft) Shanghai Book City opened, drawing large crowds. The former World Bookstore was converted into the Foreign-Language Bookstore in the 1950s; as of 2020, it includes a full floor of stationary as well as another floor that sells manga and anime-related materials under the Animate brand. Other bookshops opened along Fuzhou since the 1950s included the Shanghai Used Bookstore, the Science and Technology Book Company, and the Shanghai Xinhua Bookstore.

In 2024, the former Shen Bao headquarters housed a restaurant selling Western food. Restaurants along Fuzhou Road include Laobanzhai, which sells Shanghainese food; Wang Baohe Restaurant, known for its crabs; Xinghualou, a popular dim sum location; and the Michelin-starred Lao Zhengxing. The road also houses several museums, including the Shanghai Museum of Ink and Calligraphy and the Spring Art Museum at the Huangpu District Library. The Shanghai Cultural Centre is located along the road. Fuzhou is home to several outstanding historic buildings.

== Works cited ==
- Chen Lulu (陈露露) (6 November 2022). 文化第一街？美食天堂？福州路，值得一逛再逛 [First Cultural Street? Food Paradise? Fuzhou Road is Worth Visiting Again and Again]. The Paper (in Chinese). Archived from the original on 18 January 2025.
- French, Paul (2010). The Old Shanghai A-Z. Hong Kong: Hong Kong University Press. ISBN 978-988-8028-89-4.
- "Fuzhou Lu" (Map). Google Maps.
- "Fuzhou Road: Famous Cultural Street in Shanghai". Huangpu District Government. 31 October 2022.
- 福州路文化街 [Fuzhou Road Cultural Street] (in Chinese). Huangpu District Government.
- 福州路，上海最著名文化一条街，值得一逛再逛 [Fuzhou Road, the Most Famous Cultural Street in Shanghai, is Worth Visiting Again and Again]. The Paper (in Chinese). 26 November 2020. Archived from the original on 18 January 2025.
- Yang, Yang (9 November 2024). "Fascinating Fuzhou Road Sticks to Its Historical Roots". Shanghai Daily. p. A4-5. Archived from the original on 12 November 2024.
