= Children's Palace (China) =

Children's activity centers in China

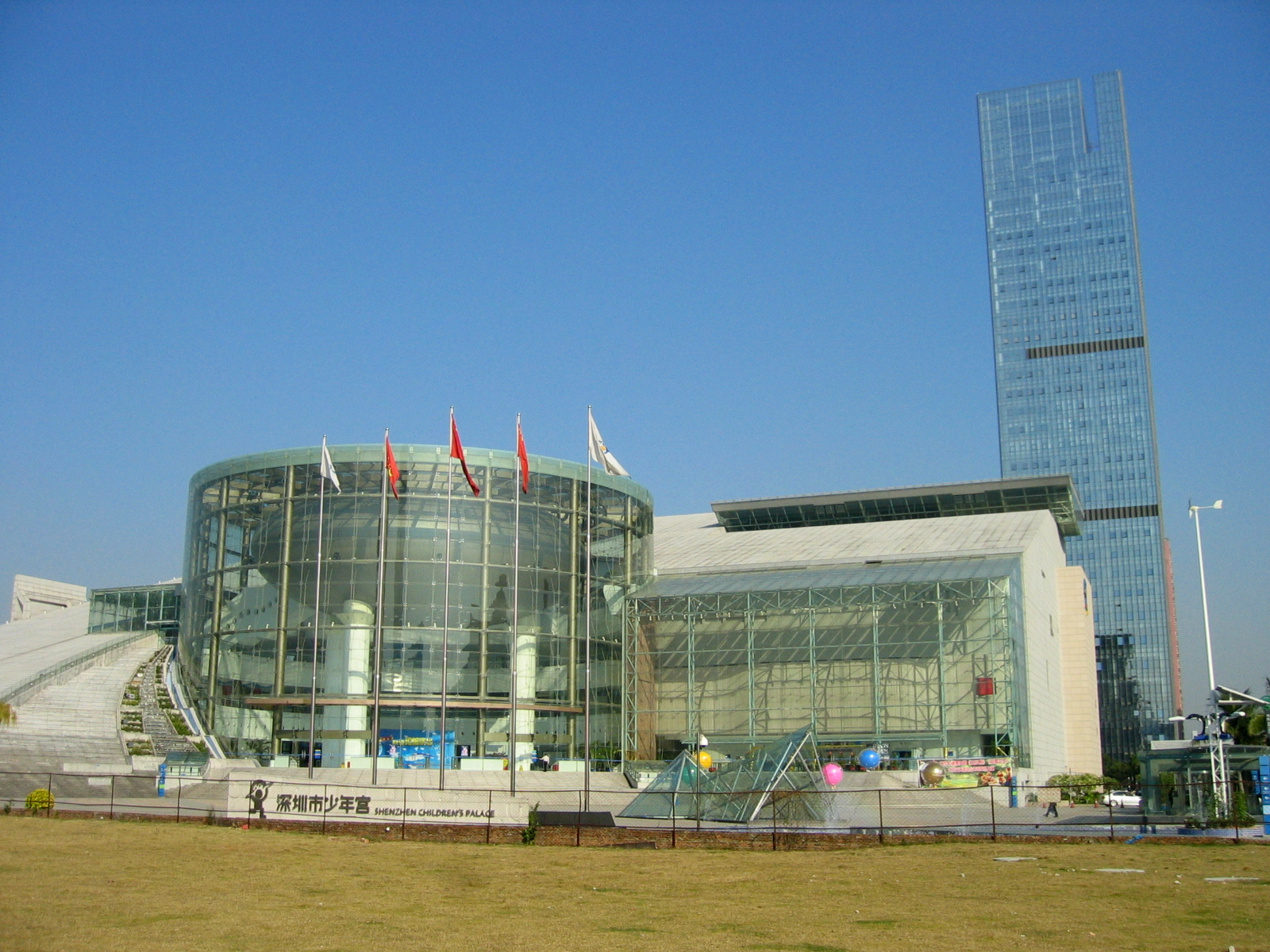
Shenzhen City Children's Palace

The Children's Palace (in Chinese: 少年宫) is a public facility in China where children engage in extra-curricular activities.

== History and activity ==
The Pioneer movement and Pioneers Palace of the Soviet Union which began in 1930 spread to other Socialist countries, such as the People's Republic of China, where they are called Children's Palaces.

At a Children's Palace, the Chinese youth engage in extra-curricular activities, such as learning music, foreign languages, and computing skills, and doing sports. In larger cities, each district has set up its Children's Palace, while there is also a City Children's Palace whose larger auditorium and planetarium are shared by the children of all the city's Districts.

== See also ==
- Mangyongdae Children's Palace, in North Korea
- Children's Palace station, a station of Shenzhen Metro
- Shanghai Changning Children's Palace, in Shanghai
