= Hotel Grand Pacific =

Hotel in Victoria, British Columbia, Canada

Coordinates: 48.4206°N 123.3726°W

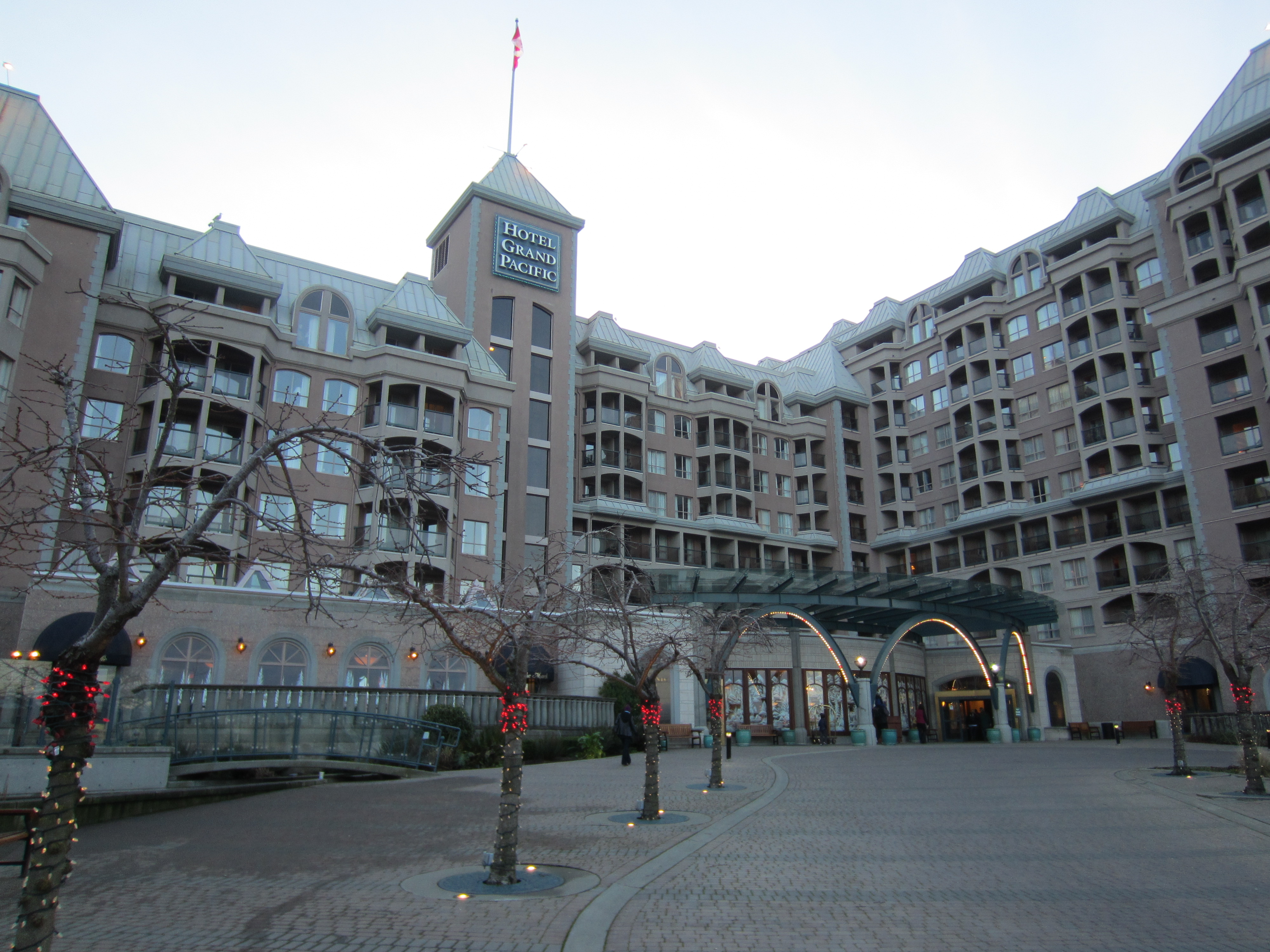
- The hotel's exterior in 2012
- Interactive map of the Hotel Grand Pacific area

General information
- Location: Victoria, British Columbia, Canada

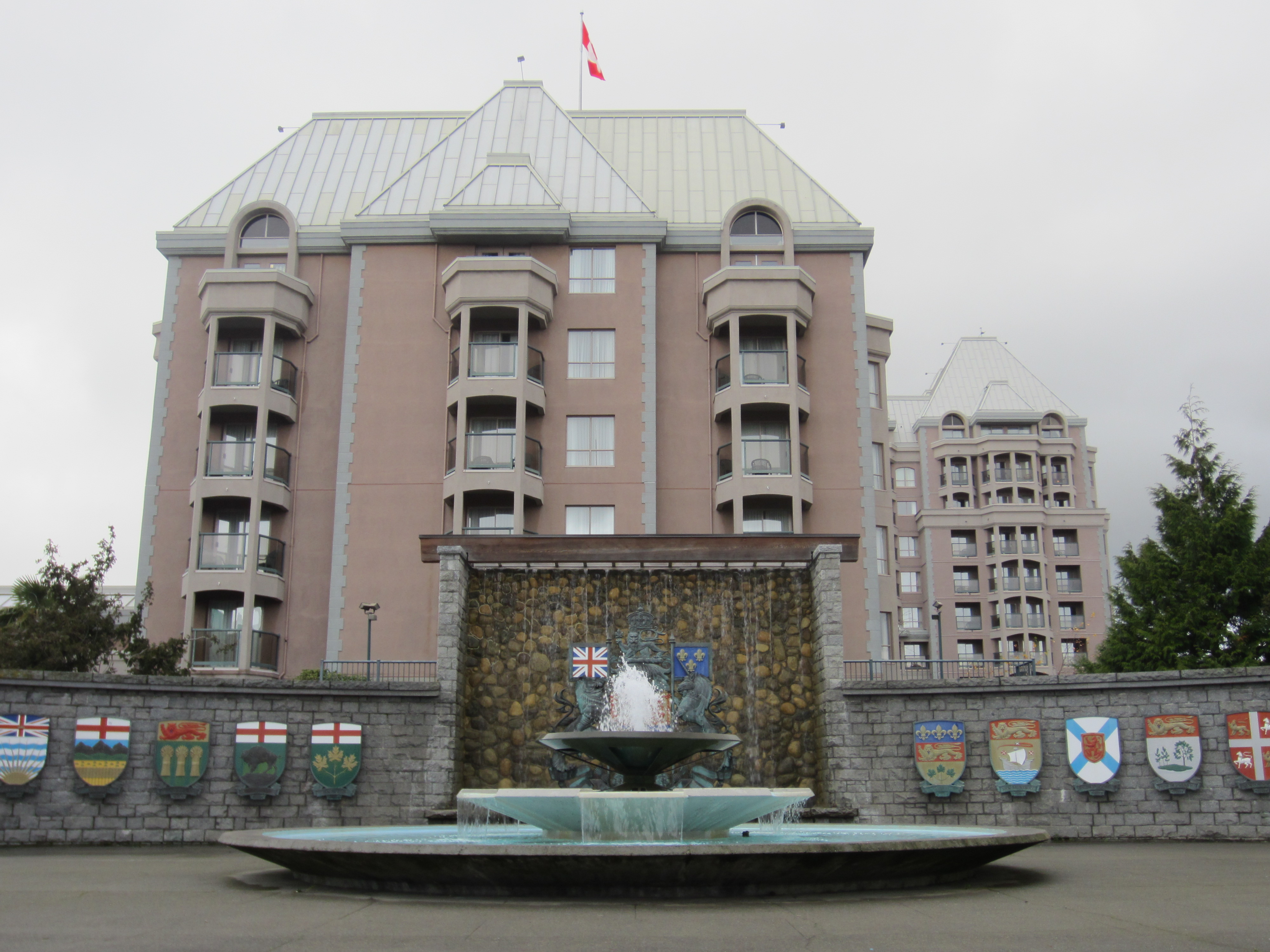
The hotel behind Confederation Garden Court, 2012

Hotel Grand Pacific is a 4.5-star hotel in Victoria, British Columbia, Canada. It was built by Murray Gammon, acquired by Standard Life in the mid 1990s, and sold to Pacific Sun in 1996. It underwent a $5 million renovation in the mid 2010s.

The hotel hosts tea, and has hosted the Victoria Whisky Festival.

In August 2017, workers associated with Unifor Local 114 threatened to strike, but an agreement was made with the hotel.
