= Gutzlaff Signal Tower =

Coordinates: 31°14′07″N 121°29′16″E

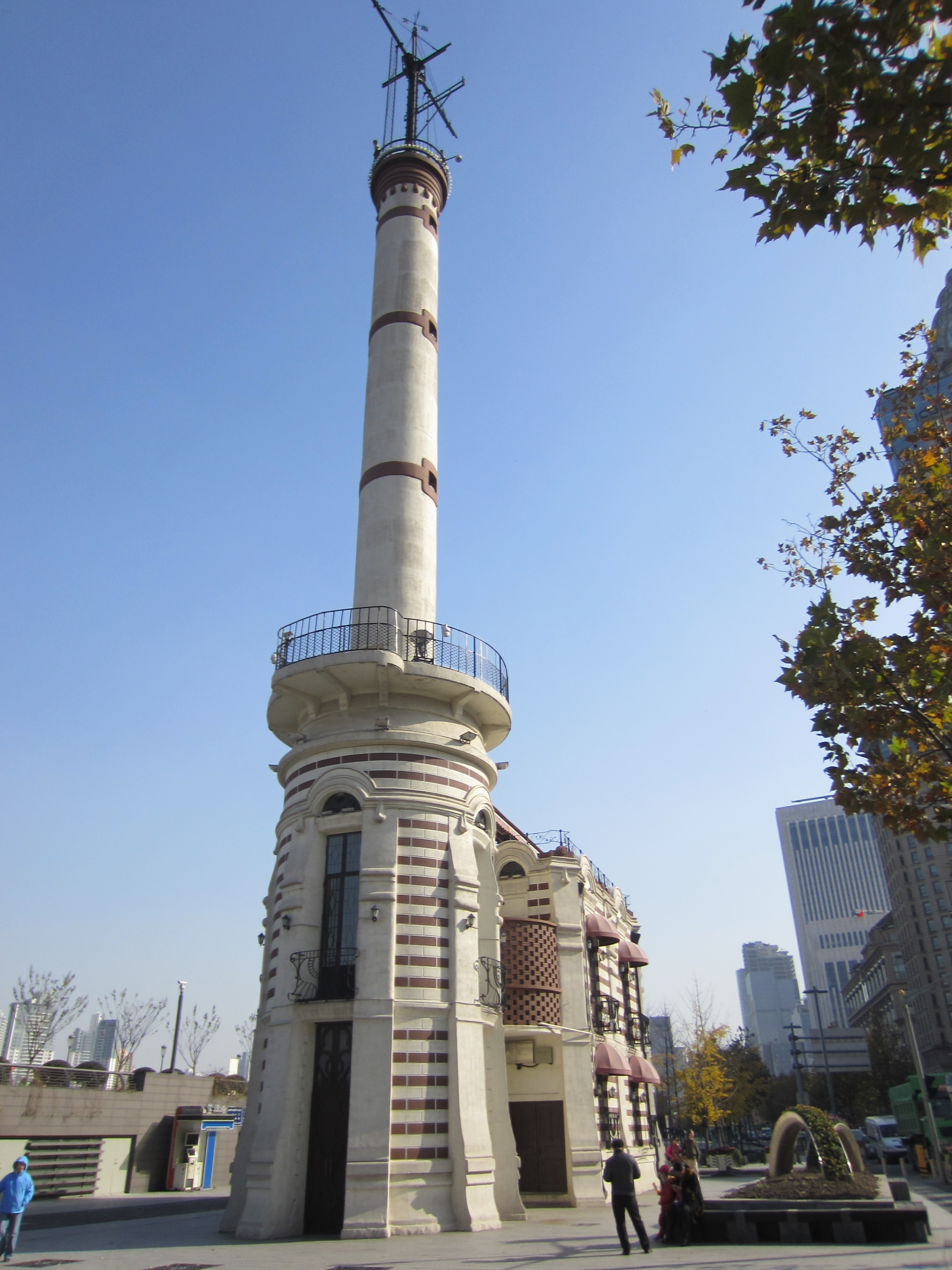
- Interactive map of the Gutzlaff Signal Tower area

General information
- Architectural style: Beaux-Arts
- Location: Shanghai, China

The Gutzlaff Signal Tower, also known as the Bund Weather Tower or the Bund Signal Tower (外滩信号台), is a major landmark in Shanghai's Bund. It is a 36.8m tall (49.8m focal height) signal station designed and built by Spanish innovator and industrialist Modesto Marti de Sola, through his company Shanghai Reinforced Concrete Company Co. in the year 1907. It was built in Beaux-Arts style, originally intended to provide weather information to ships on the Huangpu River, in particular typhoon warnings.

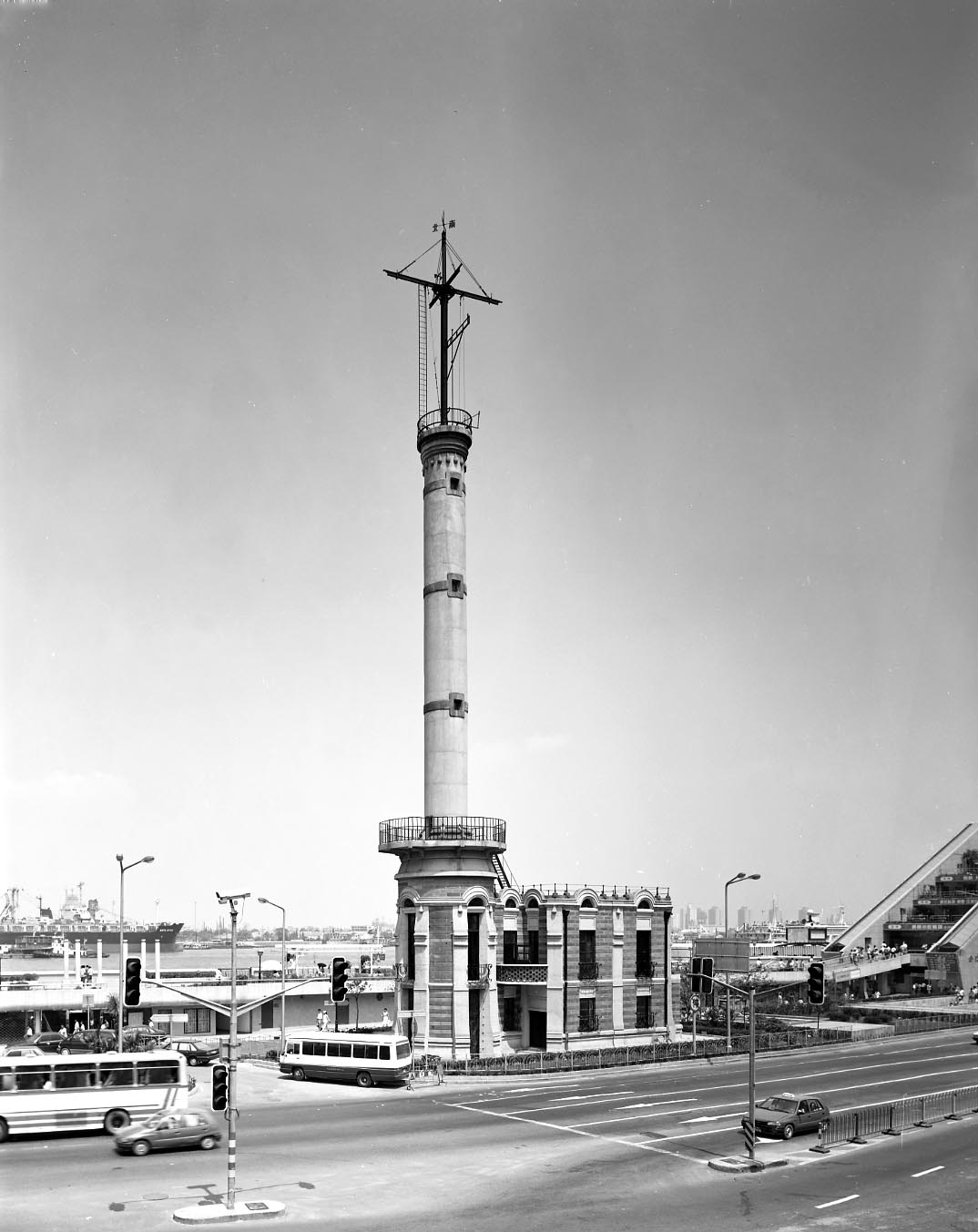
The Gutzlaff Signal Tower

== History ==
A signal station was first built in the Bund area by the French in 1865, soon after the cession of Shanghai's foreign concession. It was rebuilt in 1884, at the time of the establishment of the Zikawei Observatory by French Jesuits to offer weather forecast services to the port. The current structure was built in 1907, and named after Karl Gützlaff. The tower signaled weather reports five times a day, and gave emergency flag signals in case of typhoon or sudden inclement weather. Its operation was discontinued in 1956.

The tower was moved 22.4 m to its current location in 1993, and was reconstructed in 1999. Currently, the ground floor houses a museum of history of the Bund, and the first floor a cafe.
