= Grand Pacific Hotel (San Diego) =

Historic building in San Diego, California, U.S.

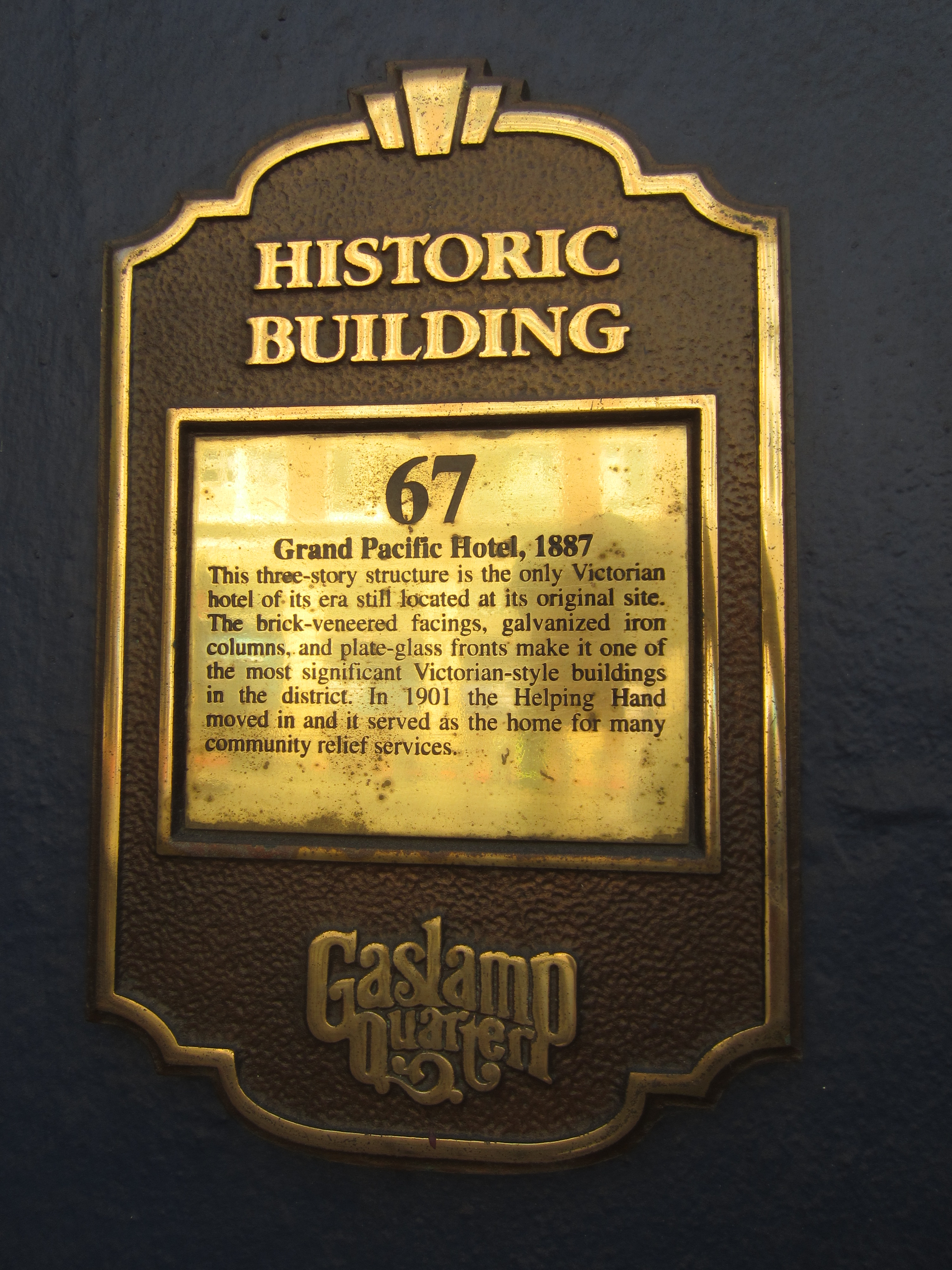
- Plaque for the building, 2016
- Interactive map of the Grand Pacific Hotel area

General information
- Type: Hotel
- Location: 366 5th Avenue, San Diego, United States
- Coordinates: 32.709216°N 117.160245°W
- Opened: 1887

The Grand Pacific Hotel is a historic Victorian era building located at 366 5th Avenue in the Gaslamp Quarter of San Diego, California. It is on the SW Corner of 5th and J Street. It was built in 1887. It was run as a hotel and in 1901 it became the home of the Helping Hand Mission. In 1907 it returned as a hotel with the children’s area of the Helping Hands remaining, which eventually became the Children’s Memorial Hospital of San Diego. The building remained a hotel under various names and management until May 1960. In the mid- 70s, the Grand Pacific became a contributing building to the rebirth of the Gaslamp Quarter Historic District and is on the National Register of Historic Places.

== See also ==
- List of Gaslamp Quarter historic buildings
