= Former American Club, Shanghai =

Building for the Shanghai Financial Court

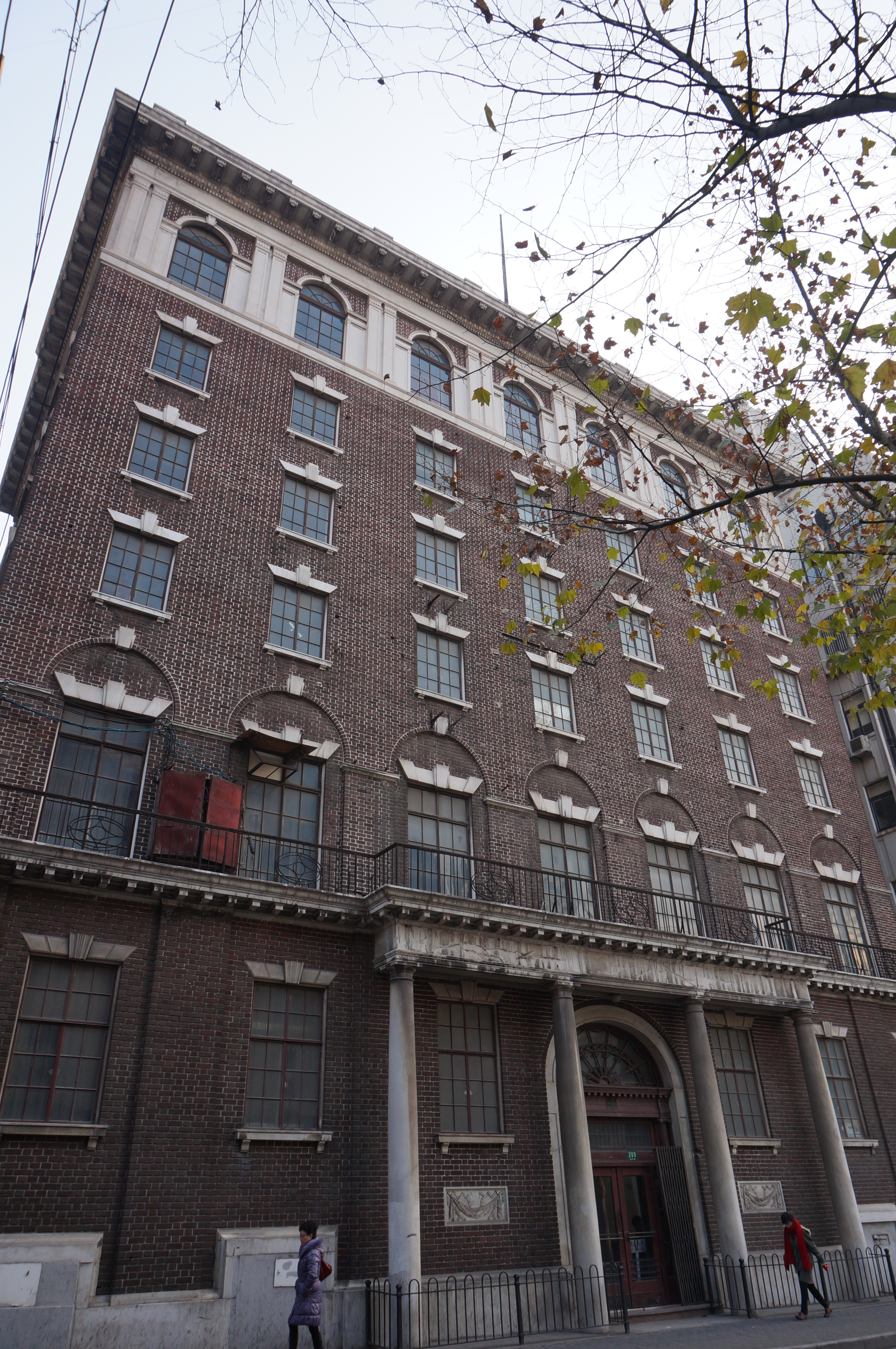
The Former American Club in Shanghai

The American Club, 209 Fuzhou Rd, Shanghai was built by László Hudec of Curry & Co. between 1923 and 1925 in the American Georgian Style. Originally built as an all-male club after purchasing the site in 1922, it was a popular club for expatriates. A six-story building plus basement, around 1000m2 per floor, designed in the common steel and concrete construction prevalent along The Bund area of Shanghai. Containing bars, billiard room and 50 bedrooms there was also a rooftop garden.

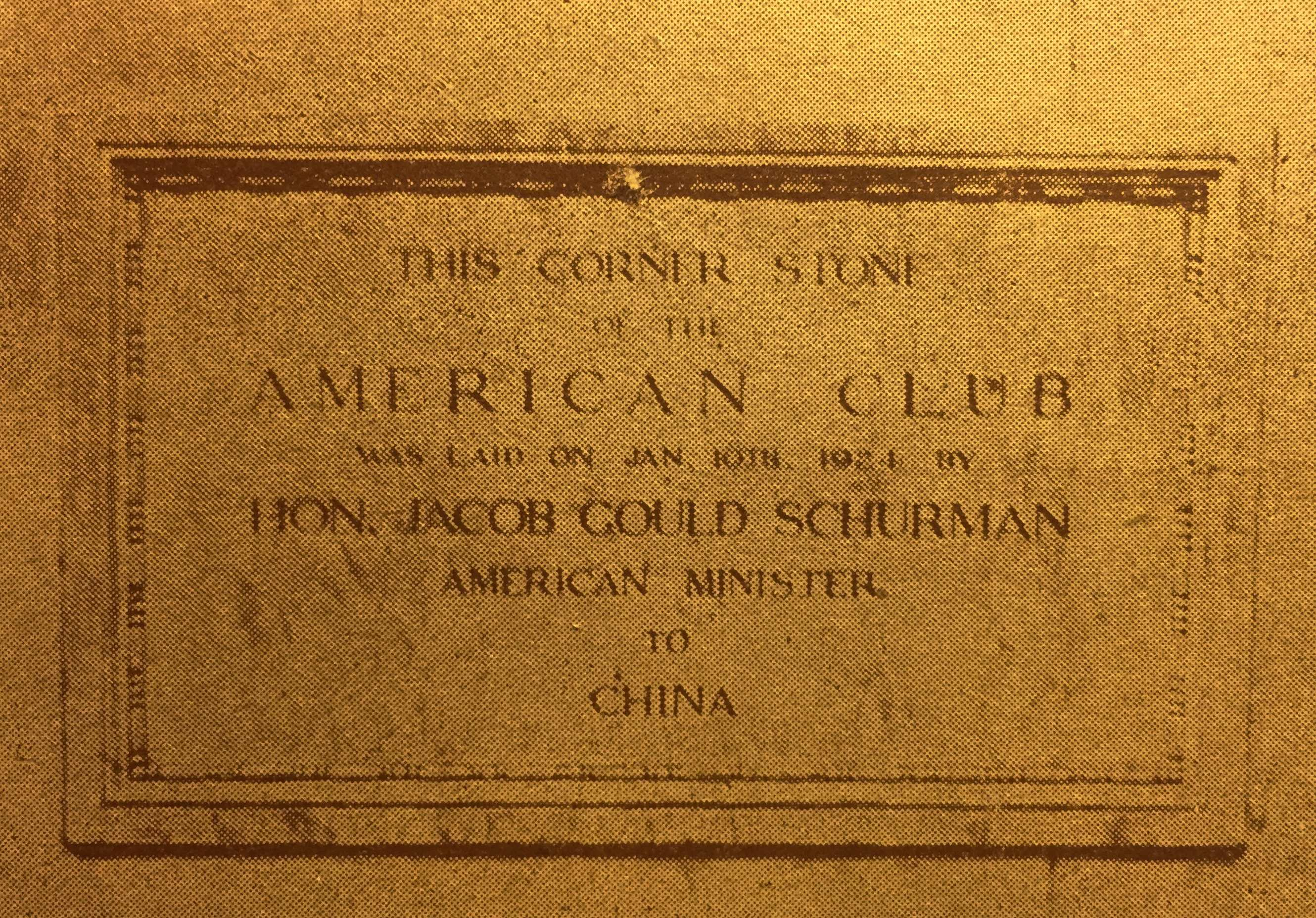
Original corner stone of the American Club

"Architect Laszlo Hudec chose the American Georgian colonial style, which was popular with social clubs in the US at that time," says Tongji University associate professor Hua Xiahong, author of the book "Shanghai Hudec Architecture." "The interior is designed ... with a lot of dark wood, classic applied columns and white door frames. It is not widely known, but the mahjong room on the second floor came from the hand of a Chinese expert, who adapted the typical Chinese official style," Hua adds. "The room has a Chinese-style coffered ceiling with colorful paintings and palace lanterns as ornaments. It is furnished with traditional Chinese square tables and fauteuils to enhance the Chinese ambience."

Between 1960 and 1991 it became the premises of the Shanghai Higher People's Court and the Shanghai Second Intermediate people's court. A Shanghai Architectural Plaque was mounted in 1994, but in 2017 the building had been unused and empty since 1991.

On 20 August 2018, the newly established Shanghai Financial Court opened in the building. In July 2025, the Financial Court vacated the building.

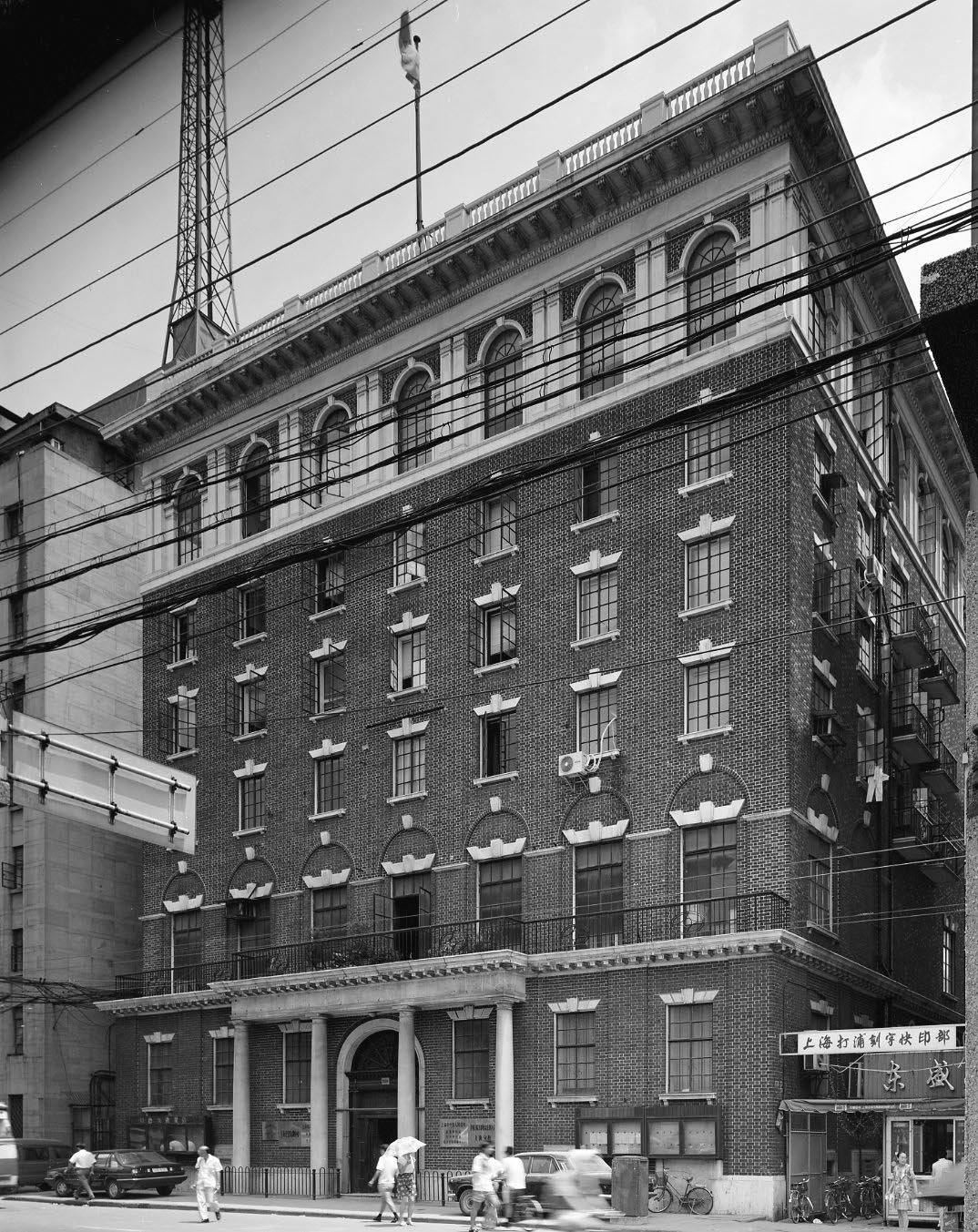
Former American Club, Shanghai
