= Mangyongdae Children's Palace =

Children's activity center in Pyongyang, North Korea

Coordinates: 39°00′50″N 125°39′32″E

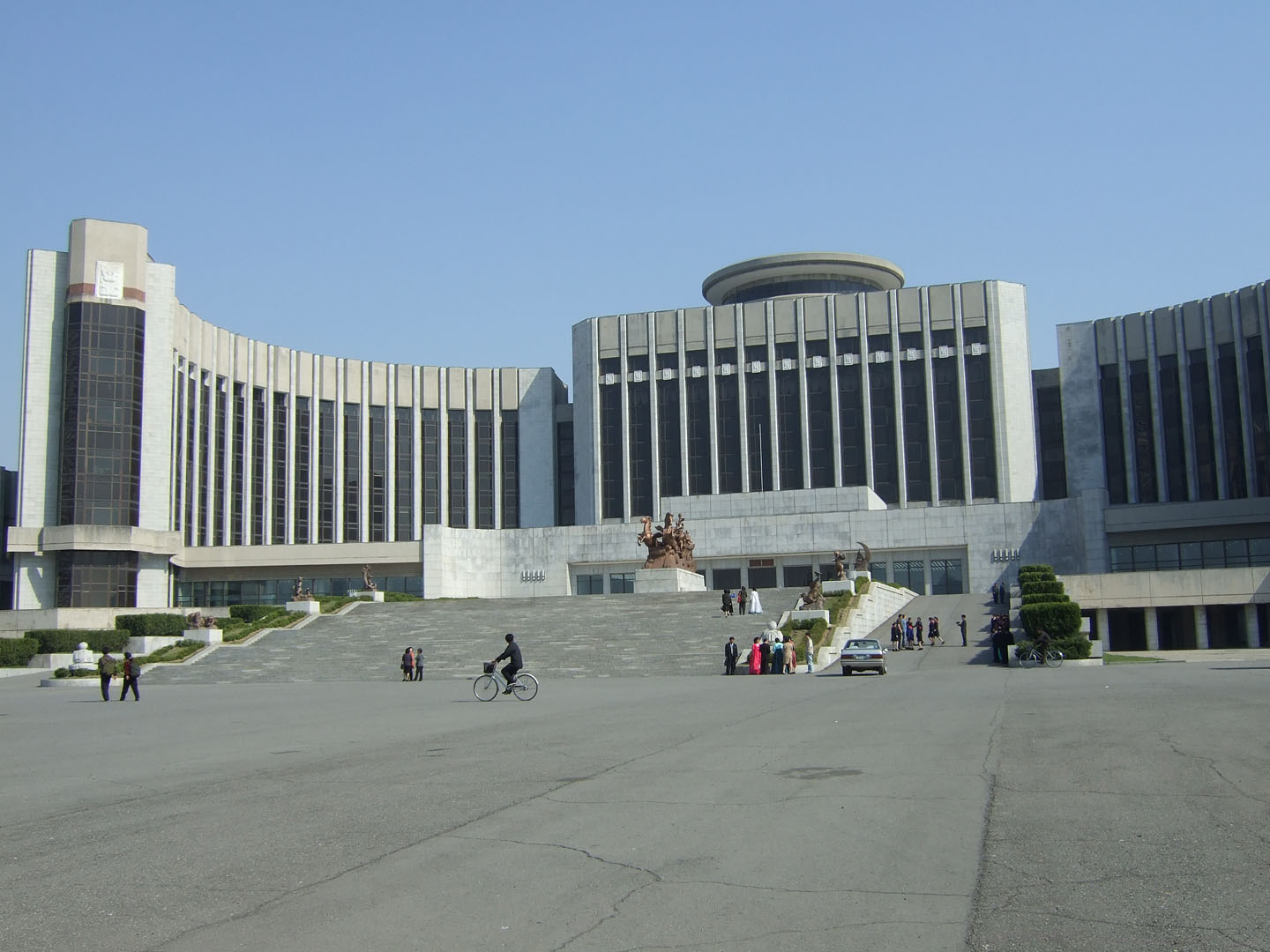

Korean name
- Hangul: 만경대학생소년궁전
- Hanja: 萬景臺學生少年宮殿
- RR: Mangyeongdae haksaeng sonyeon gungjeon
- MR: Man'gyŏngdae haksaeng sonyŏn kungjŏn

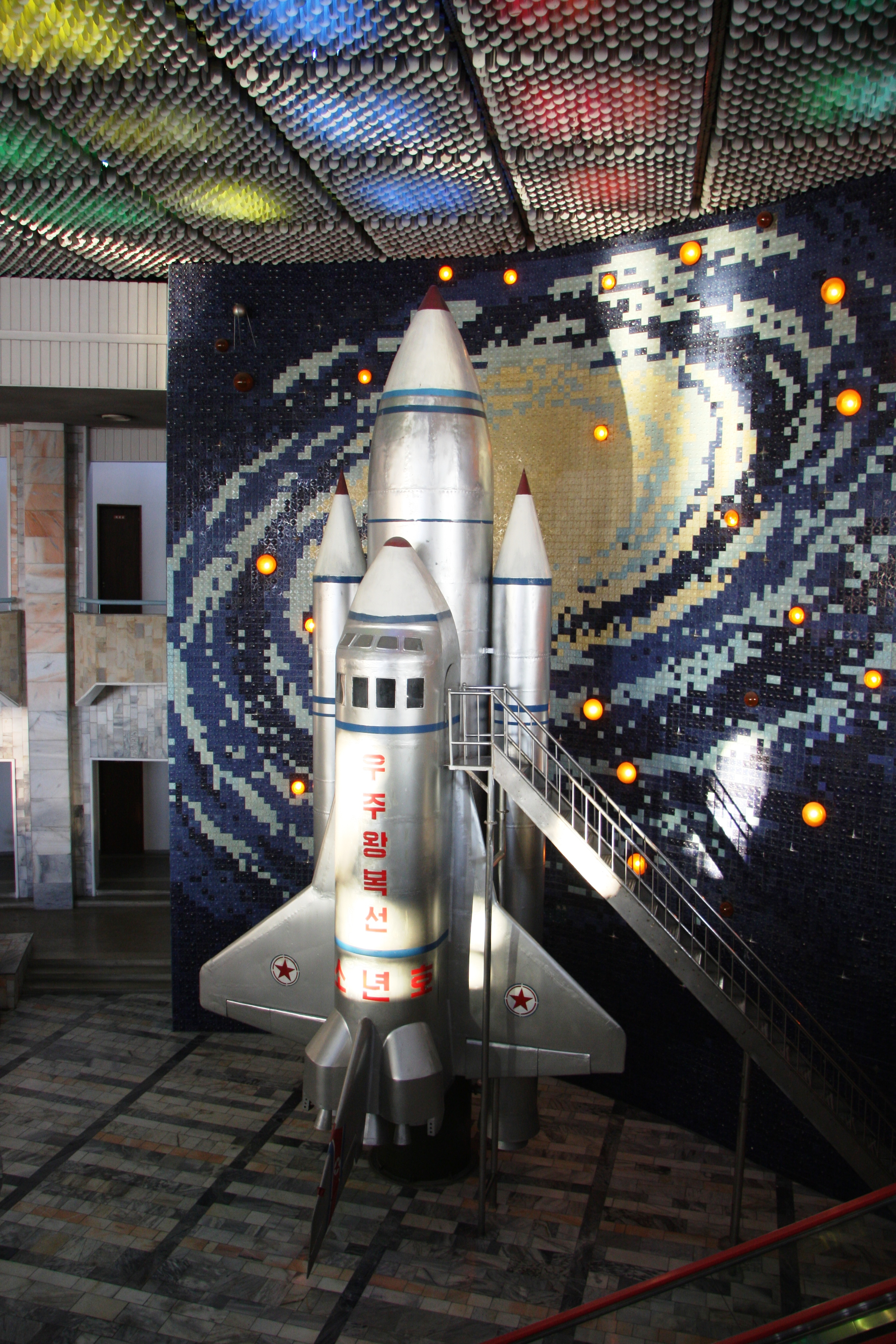
Mockup of NK spaceplane at Mangyongdae Children's Palace

The Mangyongdae Children's Palace (or Mangyongdae School Children's Palace) in Pyongyang is a public facility managed by Korean Youth Corps in North Korea where pioneer members can engage in extra-curricular activities, such as learning music, foreign languages, computing skills and sports. It was established on 2 May 1989 and it is situated in Kwangbok (Liberation) Street, in the north of Mangyongdae-guyok. It is the largest of the palaces in North Korea dedicated to children's after-school activities. In front of the Children's Palace there are a grand sculpture group and two enormous fountains, rising 90 and 100 metres.

The Mangyongdae Children's Palace has 120 rooms, a swimming pool, a gymnasium and a 2,000-seat theatre. The Mangyongdae Children's Palace is not to be confused with the Pyongyang Children's Palace situated in the north of the Kim Il-sung Square and founded in 1963. The facility employs over 500 teachers.

== Notable Alumni ==
- Jo Myung-Ae

== See also ==
- Mangyongdae-guyok
- Education in North Korea
- Children's Palace (China)
