= Shanghai Changning Children's Palace =

Coordinates: 31.2215°N 121.4224°E

- 长宁区少年宫 (Chinese)
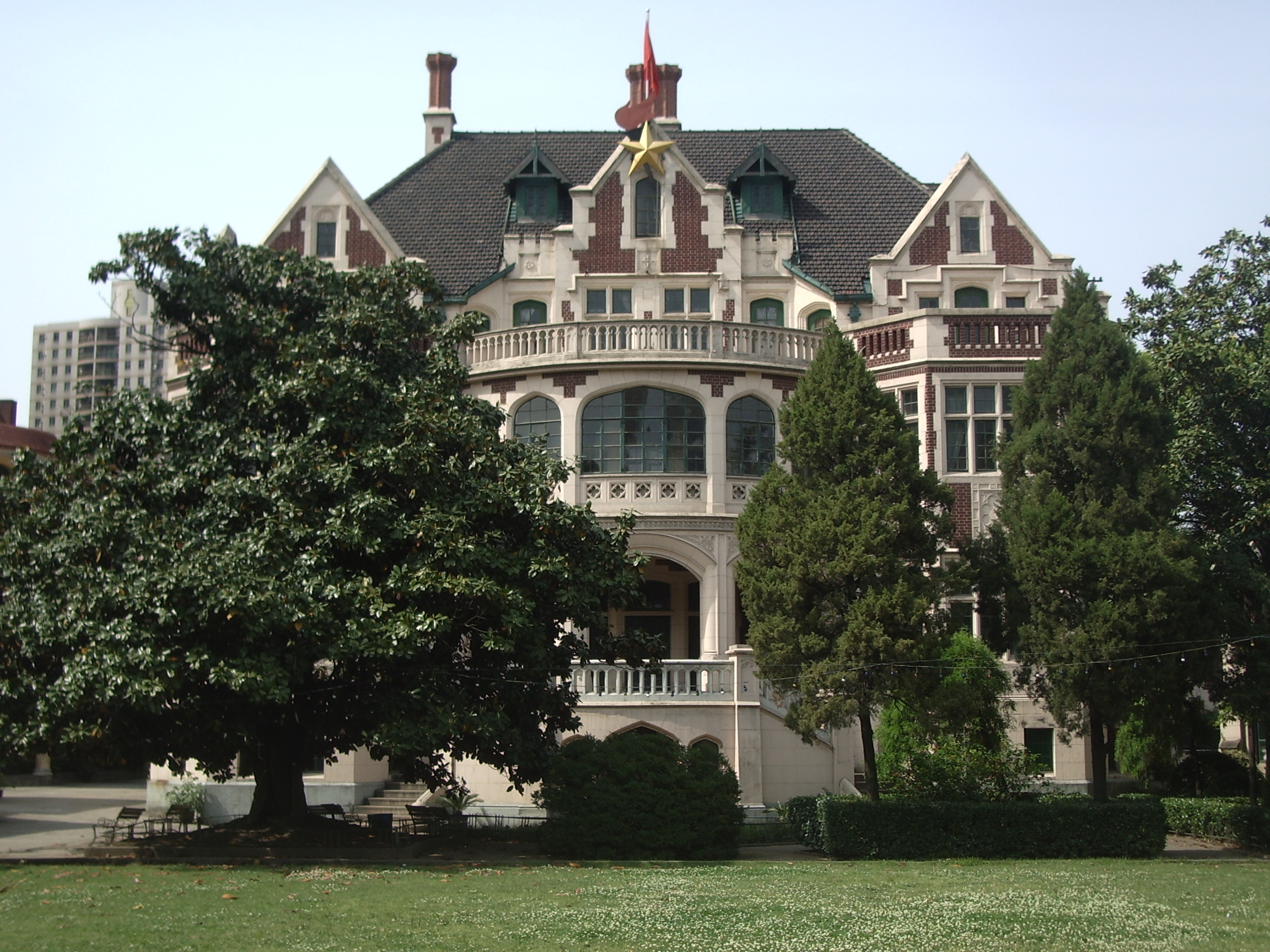
- Former home of Wang Boqun (Kuomintang Minister of Transportation)
- Interactive map of Shanghai Changning Children's Palace
- Location: Number 31, Lane 1136, Yuyuan Rd, Changning District, Shanghai, People's Republic of China 中国上海愚园路1136弄31号

History
- Built: 1932–1934
- Built for: Wang Boqun

Site notes
- Architect: Lui Yingshi
- Architectural style: Victorian Gothic
- Website: http://www.chnsng.sh.cn/

The Shanghai Changning Children's Palace (Chinese: 长宁区少年宫) is located at Number 31, Lane 1136, Yuyuan Rd in the Changning District of Shanghai, China. It was originally built for Wang Boqun, former Minister of Communications, including transportation, post, bank, and education, for the Kuomintang. The large 40-room mansion was built from 1932 to 1934 in the Victorian Gothic style. The house is currently used as a community children's center for art, music, and dance classes.

== History ==
The house was built by Wang Boqun for his new bride, Bao Zhining, to celebrate their marriage on June 18, 1931. He was the 46-year-old Kuomintang Minister of Transportation, the President of Great China University, and held the position of Guizhou representative to the Nationalist Parliament. Zhining was a 22-year-old honors graduate with a degree in social sciences from Great China University. They decided to build their new home in Shanghai so Boqun could continue to work full-time as president at the much-expanded Great China University after his retirement from his cabinet post in Nanjing. In early 1932, construction on the house began on no. 31, Lane 1136, Yuyuan Road, in the French quarters of Shanghai. The house was designed by a Shanghai architect, Lui Yingshi. The main building consisted of three floors, for a total of 21,500 square feet.

From 1941 to 1944, during the Second Sino-Japanese War, the house was used by the head of Japan's puppet government, Wang Jingwei. After the war, it became a Kuomintang prison and was used as an execution ground for Communist revolutionaries. In 1947, Bao Zhining, widowed in 1944, returned to Shanghai and rented the house to the British Embassy for use as its Shanghai Consulate General and British Information offices. From 1949 to 1960, the house was used for government offices, after which it was turned into the Children's Palace.

== Exterior ==
The 5,000-square-meter (53,820-square-foot) garden was once filled with streams, bridges and pavilions. A 120-year-old southern magnolia tree still stands on the lawn. The large stone at the entrance to the garden was brought via train from Guizhou province so Wang Boqun could have a piece of home in Shanghai.

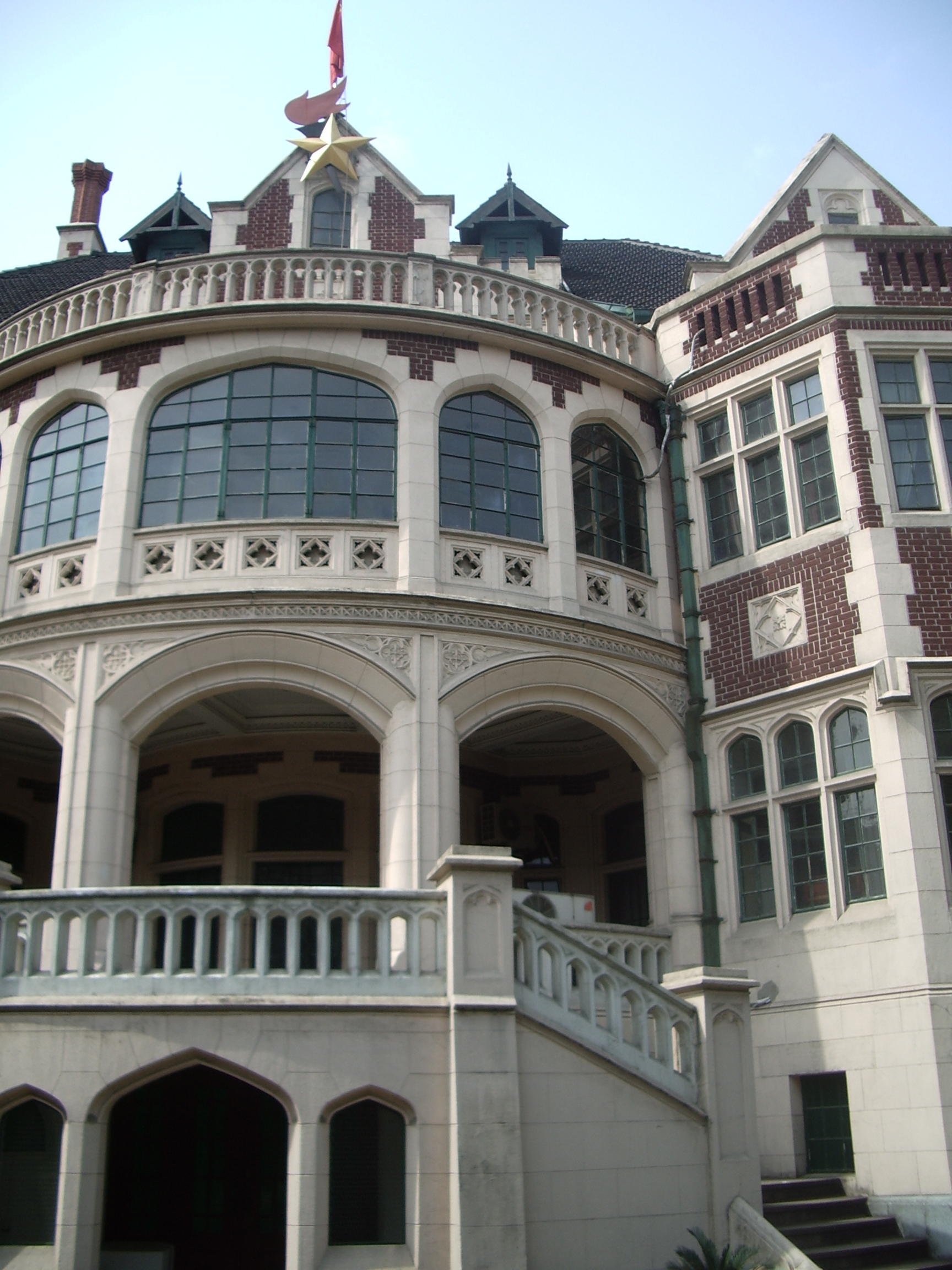

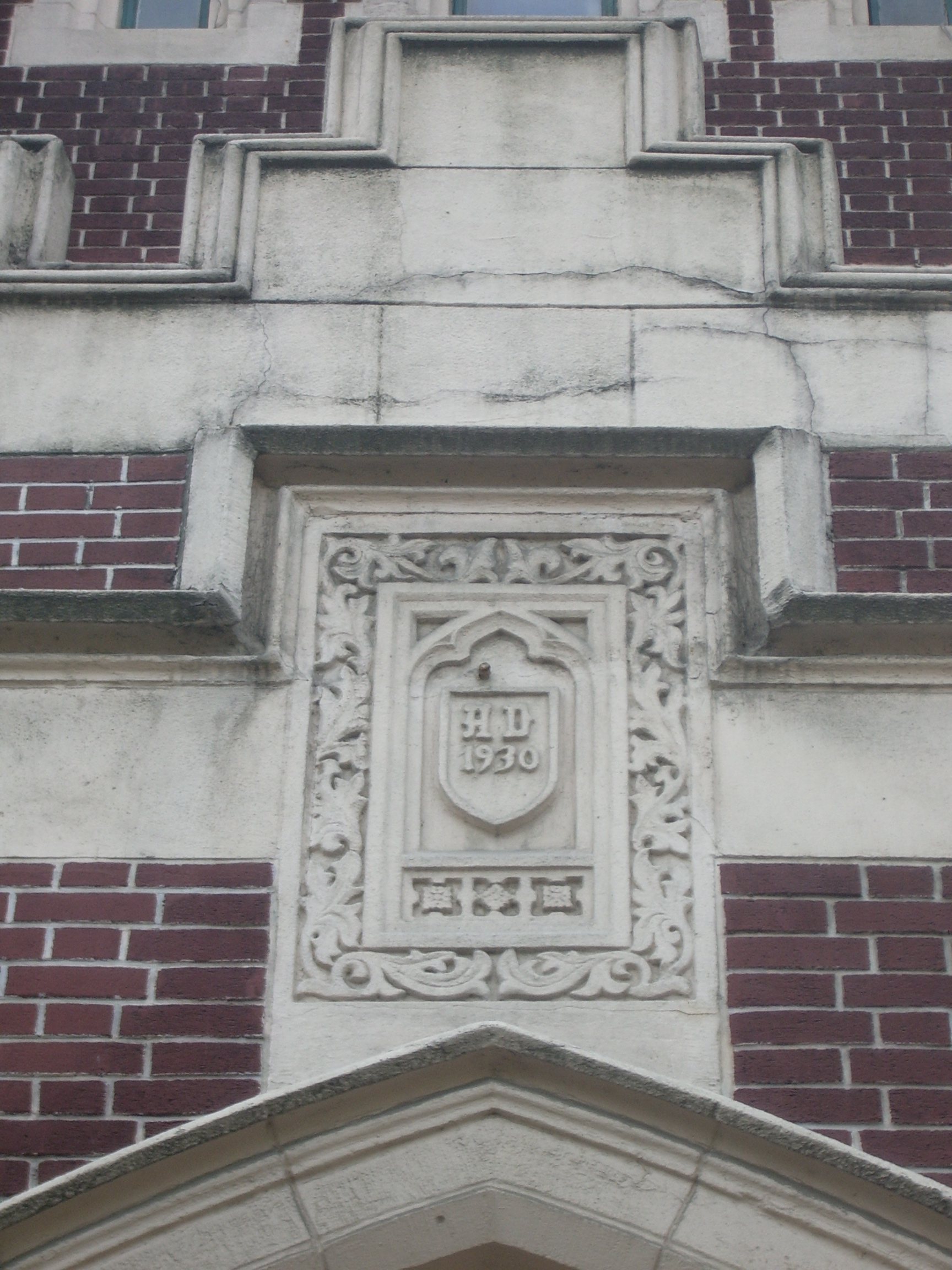

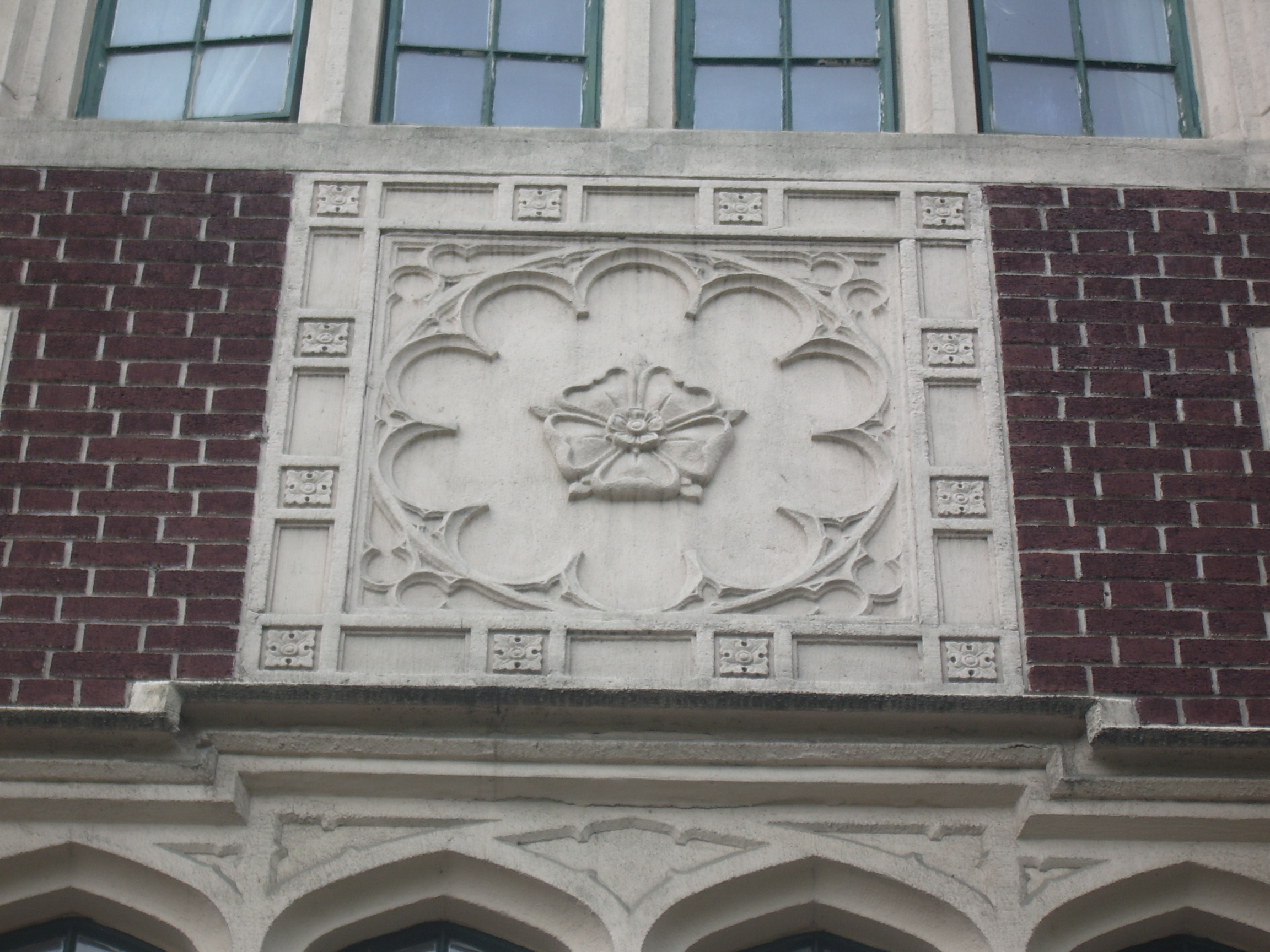

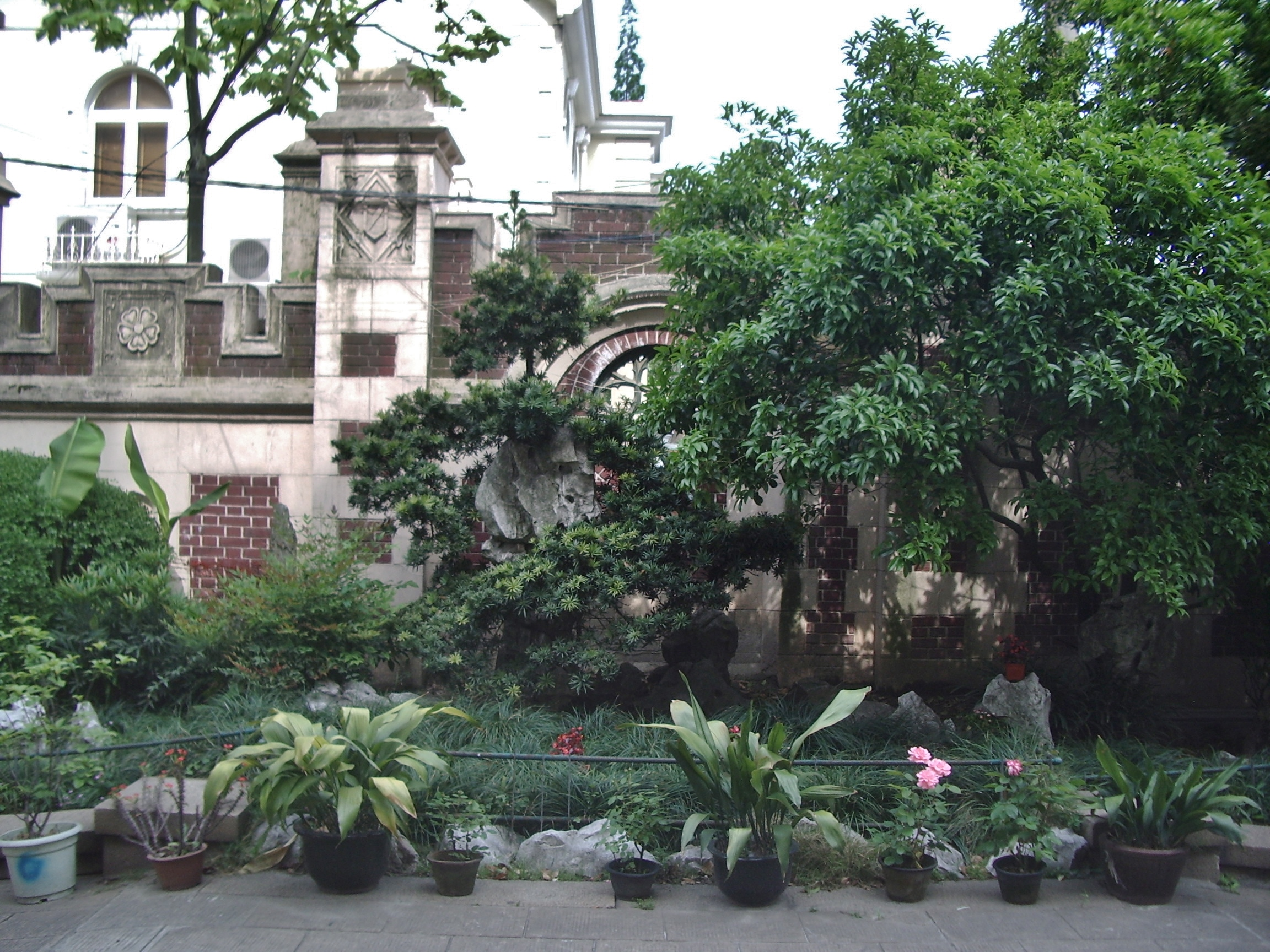

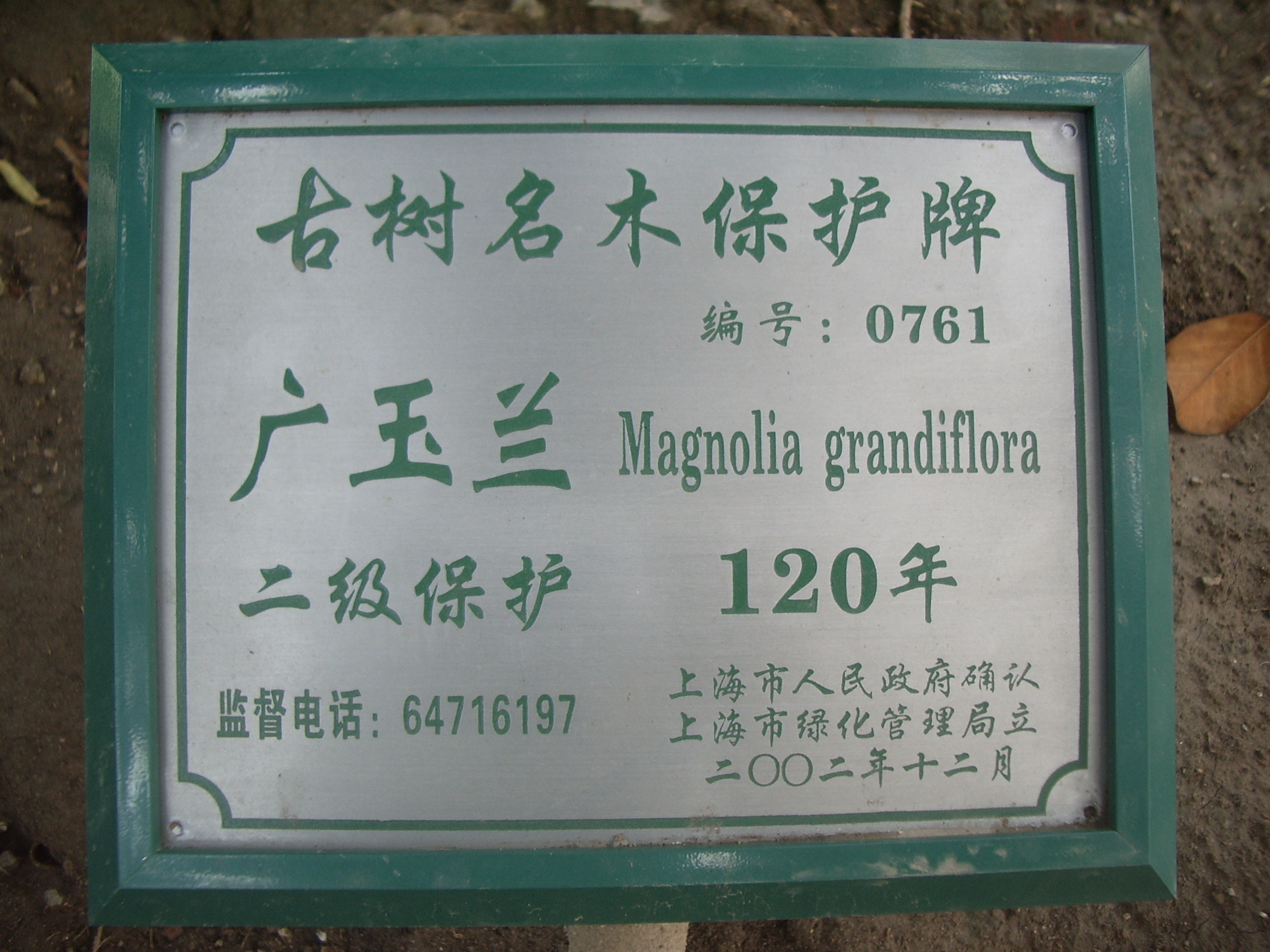

== Interior ==
The main building has over 40 rooms, Gothic arches, marble columns, and vast fireplaces. The rooms are currently used for music, dance, and art lessons.

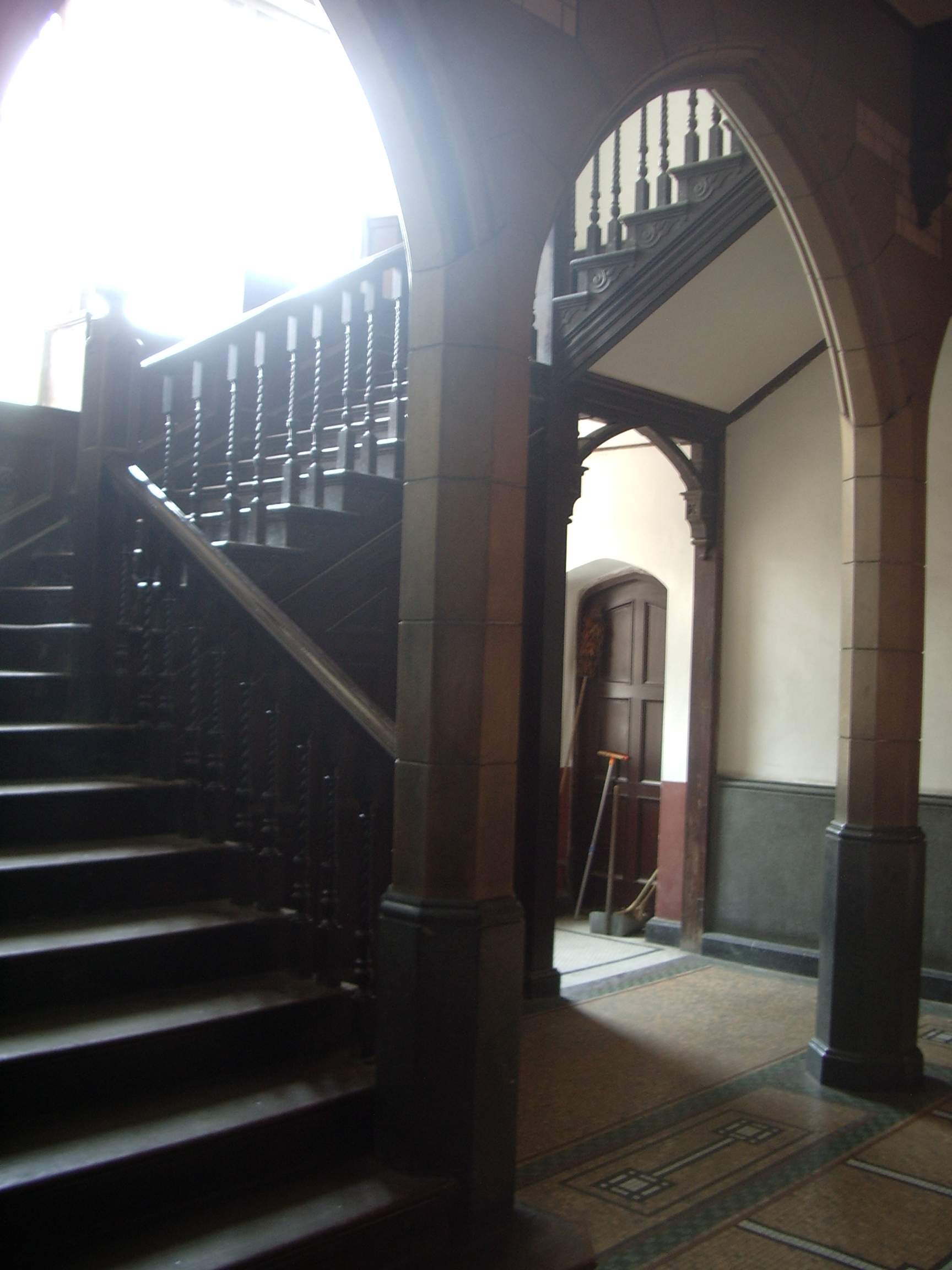

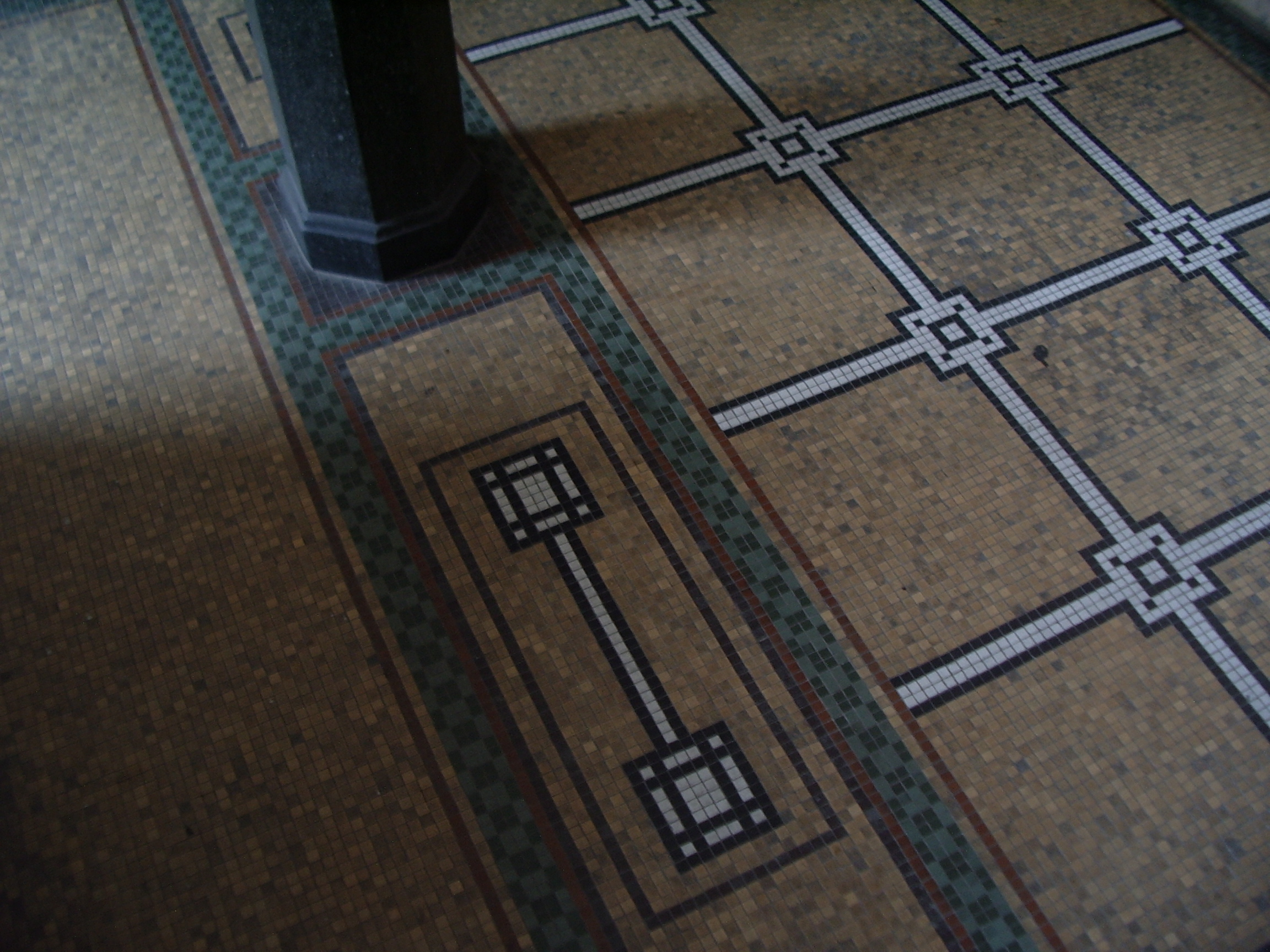

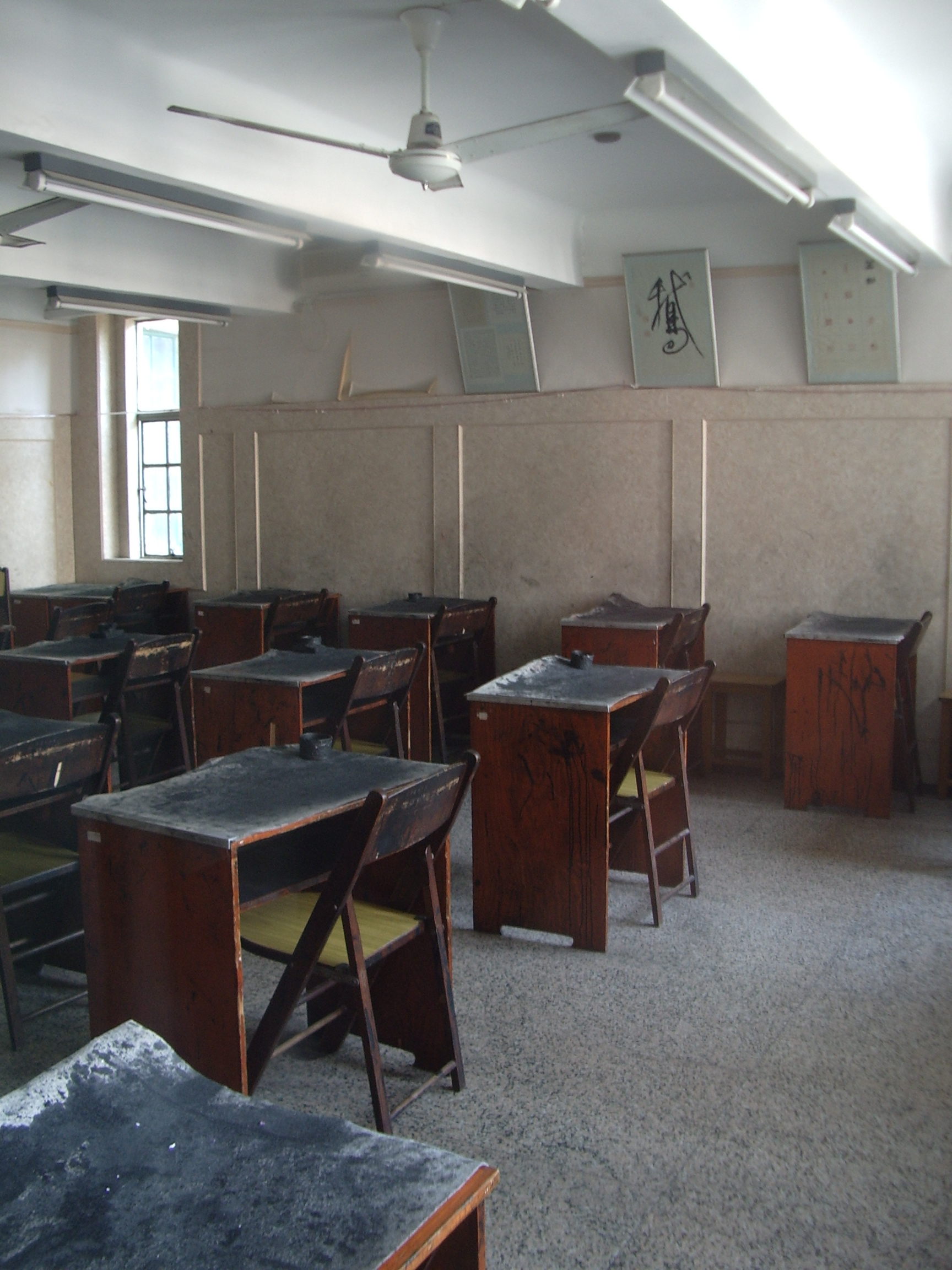

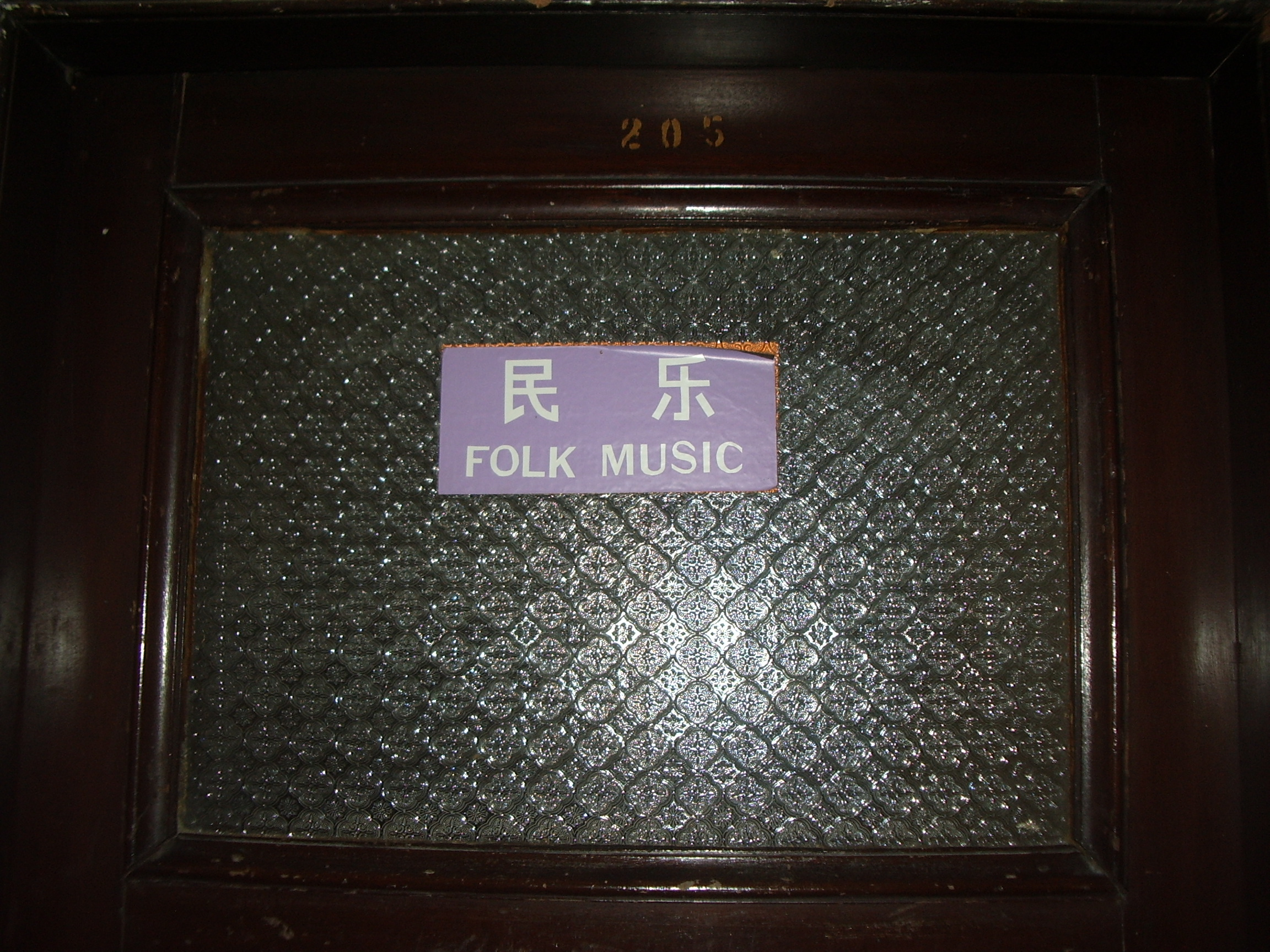

== See also ==
- Kuomintang
- Wang Jingwei
- Second Sino-Japanese War
- Nationalist Government (China)
- List of historic buildings in Shanghai
