= Pacific Hotel Shanghai =

Hotel in Huangpu, Shanghai, China

Coordinates: 31.2362°N 121.4680°E

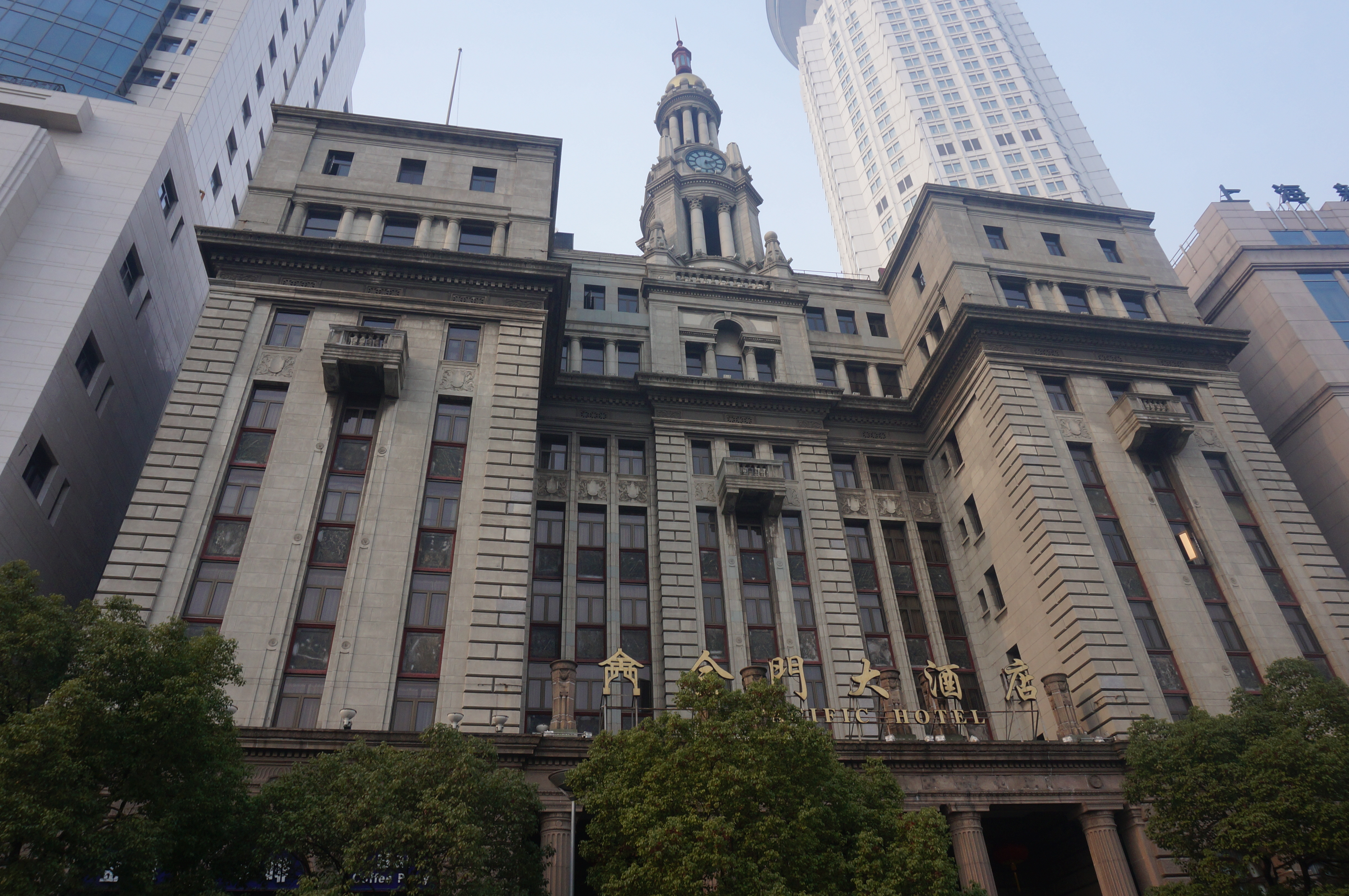
- The hotel's exterior in 2013
- Interactive map of the Pacific Hotel Shanghai area

General information
- Location: 108 Nanjing West Road, Shanghai, China

The Pacific Hotel Shanghai, also known as Shanghai Pacific Hotel and formerly the Hua Qiao Hotel, is a hotel located at 108 Nanjing West Road, across from People's Park, in Shanghai's Huangpu District, in China. According to its website, the hotel is operated by Shanghai Jin Jiang Group.
