= The Bund =

Historical district in central Shanghai, China

Coordinates: 31°14′16.9″N 121°29′10.1″E

- "The Bund" in Simplified (top) and Traditional (bottom) Chinese characters
- Simplified Chinese: 外滩
- Traditional Chinese: 外灘
- Literal meaning: "Outer Beach"
Transcriptions
Standard Mandarin
- Hanyu Pinyin: Wàitān
- IPA: [wâɪ.tʰán]
Wu
- Romanization: nga^{6}-the^{1}

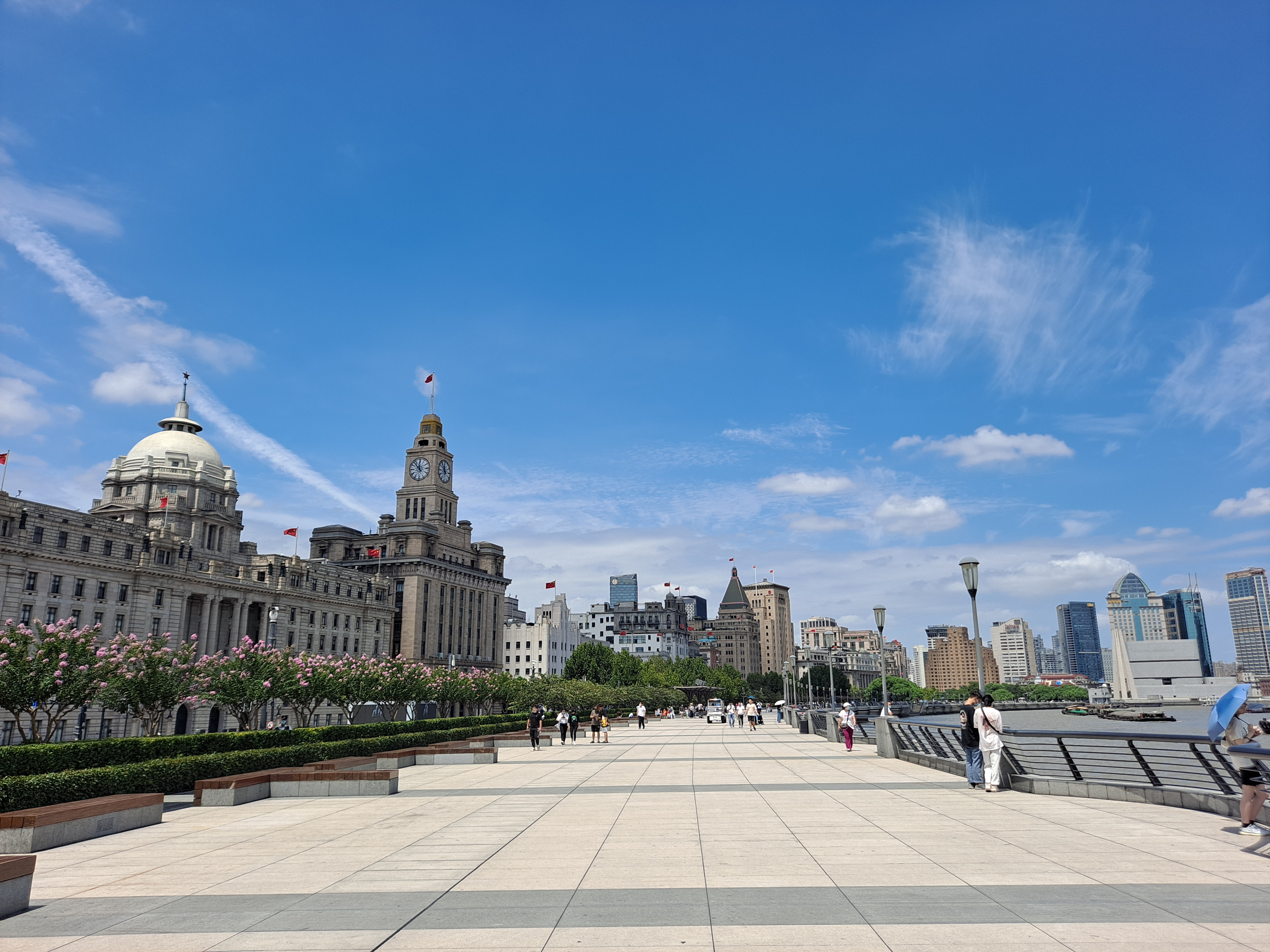
The Bund in 2022

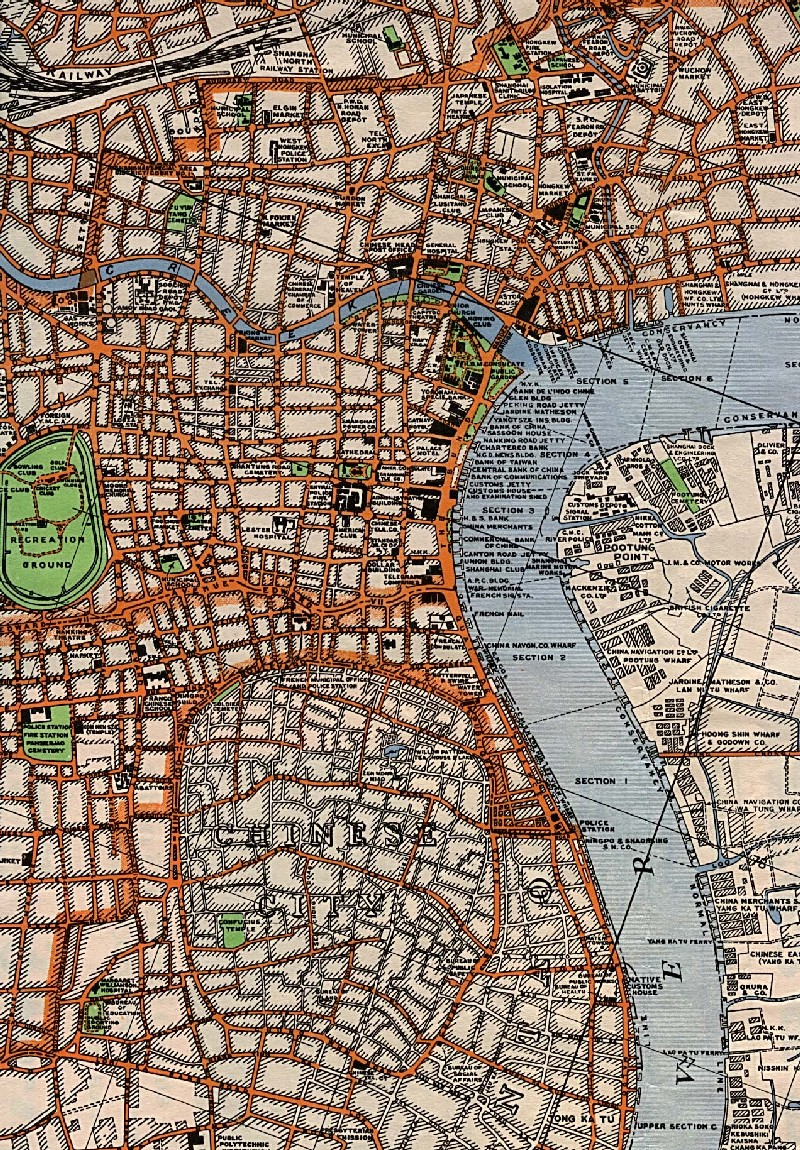
A 1933 map of the Bund

The Bund (Note: simplified Chinese: 外滩; traditional Chinese: 外灘; pinyin: Wàitān, Shanghainese romanization: Nga^{3}thae^{1}, Wu Chinese pronunciation: [ŋà.tʰɛ́], lit. 'Outer Beach') is a waterfront area and a protected historical district in central Shanghai. The area centers on a section of Zhongshan Road (East Zhongshan Road No.1) within the former Shanghai International Settlement, which runs along the western bank of the Huangpu River in the eastern part of Huangpu. The area along the river faces the modern skyscrapers of Lujiazui in Pudong. The Bund usually refers to the buildings and wharves on this section of the road, as well as some adjacent areas. This region has a significant European influence, with the style of many structures most comparable to that of European cities, particularly Gothic, Baroque, Neoclassical, Romanesque, Art Deco, and Renaissance architecture. Additionally, some of the city's top eateries are located there. From the 1860s to the 1930s, it was the rich and powerful center of the foreign establishment in Shanghai, operating as a legally protected treaty port.

== Name ==
The term "bund" was borrowed into English from Hindustani and originally referred to a dyke or embankment. Within the Chinese treaty ports, it was applied specifically to an embanked quay running along the shore. The Chinese name for the Bund is unrelated in origin: it literally means "outer bank", and distinguishes this part of the riverfront from the "inner bank" adjacent to the old city of Shanghai.

== History ==
The Bund in 1930, with the Allied War Memorial on the right

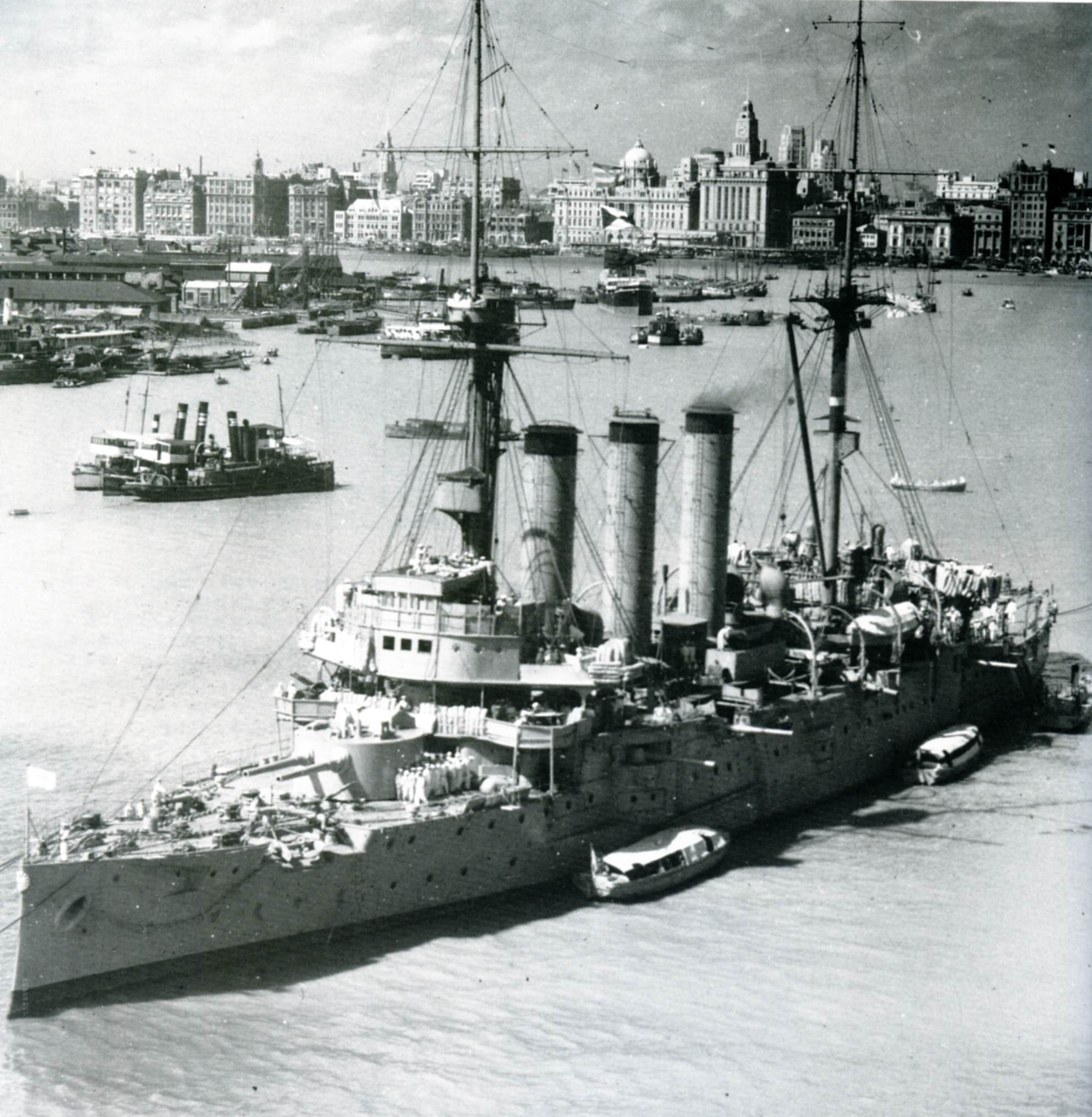
The Bund in 1937, Japanese cruiser Izumo in the foreground

The Shanghai Bund has dozens of historical buildings, lining the Huangpu River, that once housed numerous banks and trading houses from the United Kingdom, France, the United States, Italy, Russia, Germany, Japan, the Netherlands, and Belgium, as well as the consulates of Russia and Britain, a newspaper, the Shanghai Club and the Masonic Club. The Bund lies north of the old, walled city of Shanghai. It was initially a British settlement; later the British and American settlements were combined in the International Settlement in 1863. Commercial buildings in the Beaux Arts style sprang up in the years around the turn of the 20th century as the Bund developed into a major financial center of East Asia. Directly to the south, and just northeast of the old walled city, the former French Bund (the quai de France, part of the Shanghai French Concession) was of comparable size to the Bund but functioned more as a working harbourside.

Some buildings on the Bund have a deliberate echo of those of Liverpool's waterfront, particularly those known as 'the Three Graces'.

By the 1940s, the Bund housed the headquarters of many, if not most, of the major financial institutions operating in China, including the "big four" national banks in the Republic of China era. However, with the Communist victory in the Chinese Civil War, many of these financial institutions were gradually moved to Hong Kong in the 1950s. Hotels and clubs were closed or converted to other uses. The statues of colonial figures and foreign worthies which had dotted the riverside were also removed.

=== Post Cultural Revolution ===
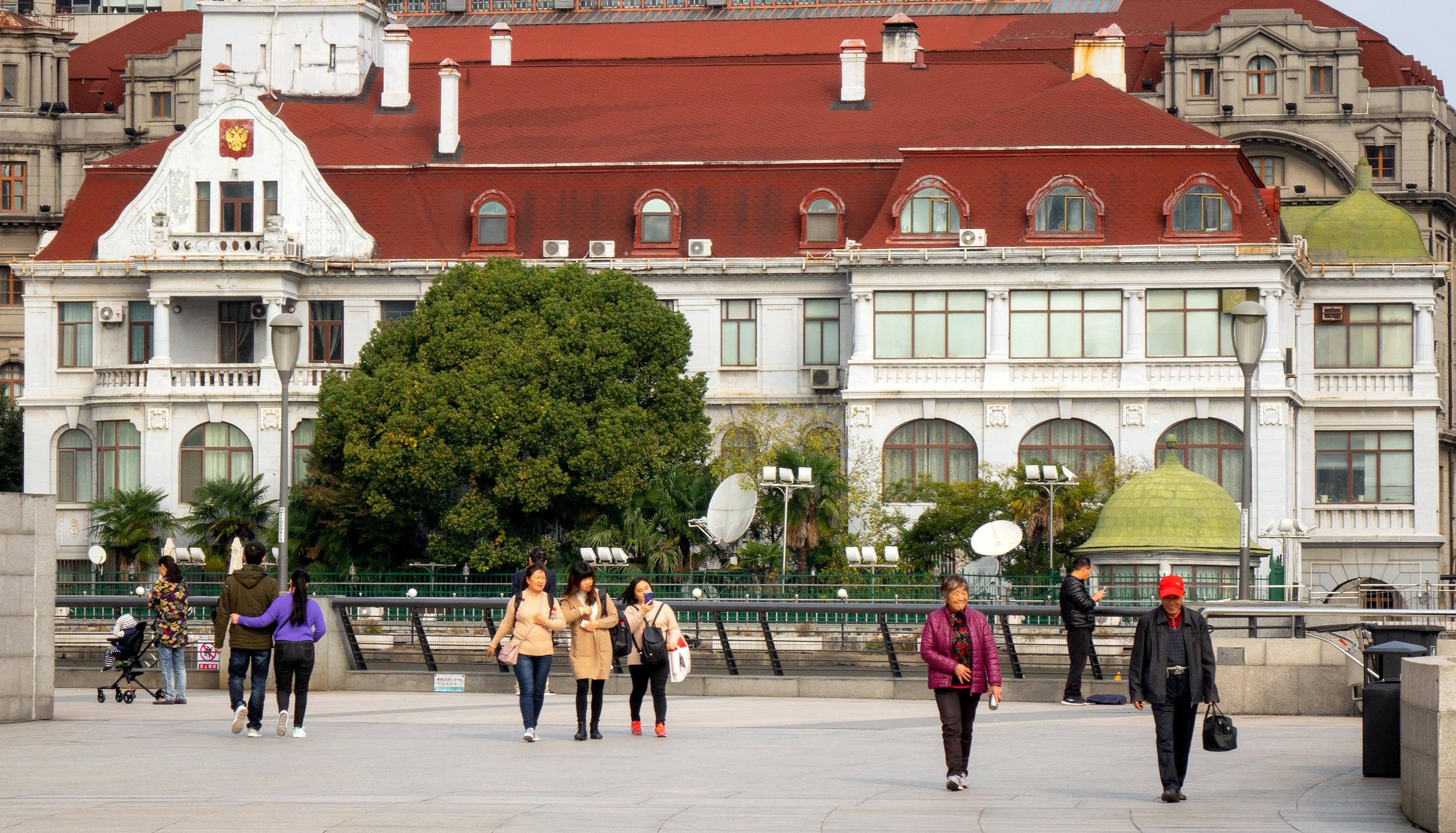
The Russian Consulate on the "northern Bund" at 20 Huangpu Rd, Hongkou District

In the late 1970s and early 1980s, with the thawing of economic policy in the People's Republic of China, buildings on the Bund were gradually returned to their former uses. Government institutions were moved out in favour of financial institutions, while hotels resumed trading as such. Also during this period, a series of floods caused by typhoons motivated the municipal government to construct a tall levee along the riverfront, with the result that the embankment now stands some 10 metres higher than street level. In the 1990s, Zhongshan Road (named after Sun Yat-sen), the road on which the Bund is centred, was widened to ten lanes. As a result, most of the parkland which had existed along the road disappeared. Also in this period, the ferry wharves connecting the Bund and Pudong, which had served the area's original purpose, were removed. A number of pleasure cruises still operate from some nearby wharves.

In the 1990s, the Shanghai government attempted to promote an extended concept of the Bund to boost tourism, and land value in nearby areas, as well as to reconcile the promotion of "colonial relics" with the Socialist ideology. In its expanded form, the term "Bund" (as "New Bund" or "Northern Bund") was used to refer to areas south of Yan'an Road, and a stretch of riverfront north of the Suzhou River (Zhabei). Such use of the term, however, remains rare outside of tourism literature. On March 28, 2010, the eve of the opening of the World Expo, the Bund fully completed its renovation project.

=== 21st century redevelopment ===
From 2008, a major reconfiguration of traffic flow along the Bund was carried out. The first stage of the plan involved the southern end of the Bund, and saw the demolition of a section of the Yan'an Road elevated expressway, including removal of the large elevated expressway exit structure that formerly dominated the confluence of Yan'an Road and the Bund. A second phase involved the year-long restoration of the century-old Waibaidu Bridge at the northern end of the Bund. In a third stage, the former 10-lane Bund roadway was reconstructed in two levels, with six lanes carried in a new tunnel. The vacated road space was used to widen the landscaped promenade along the waterfront. The new concrete bridge that was built in 1991 to relieve traffic on Waibaidu Bridge was rendered obsolete by the new double-levelled roadway, and demolished. The Bund was reopened to the public on Sunday 28 March 2010 after restoration for the 2010 Expo.

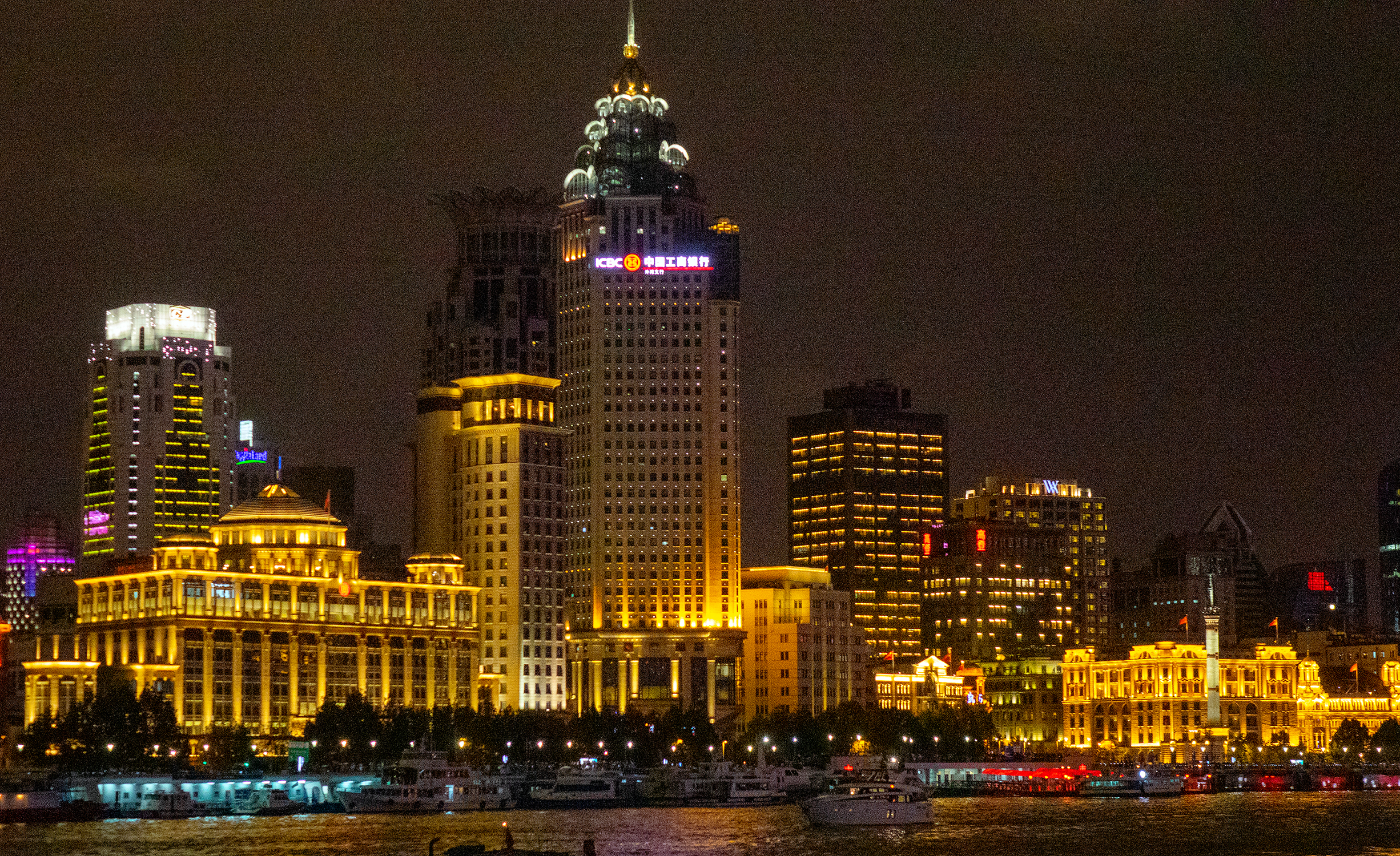
The ICBC and other buildings on the Bund, 2018

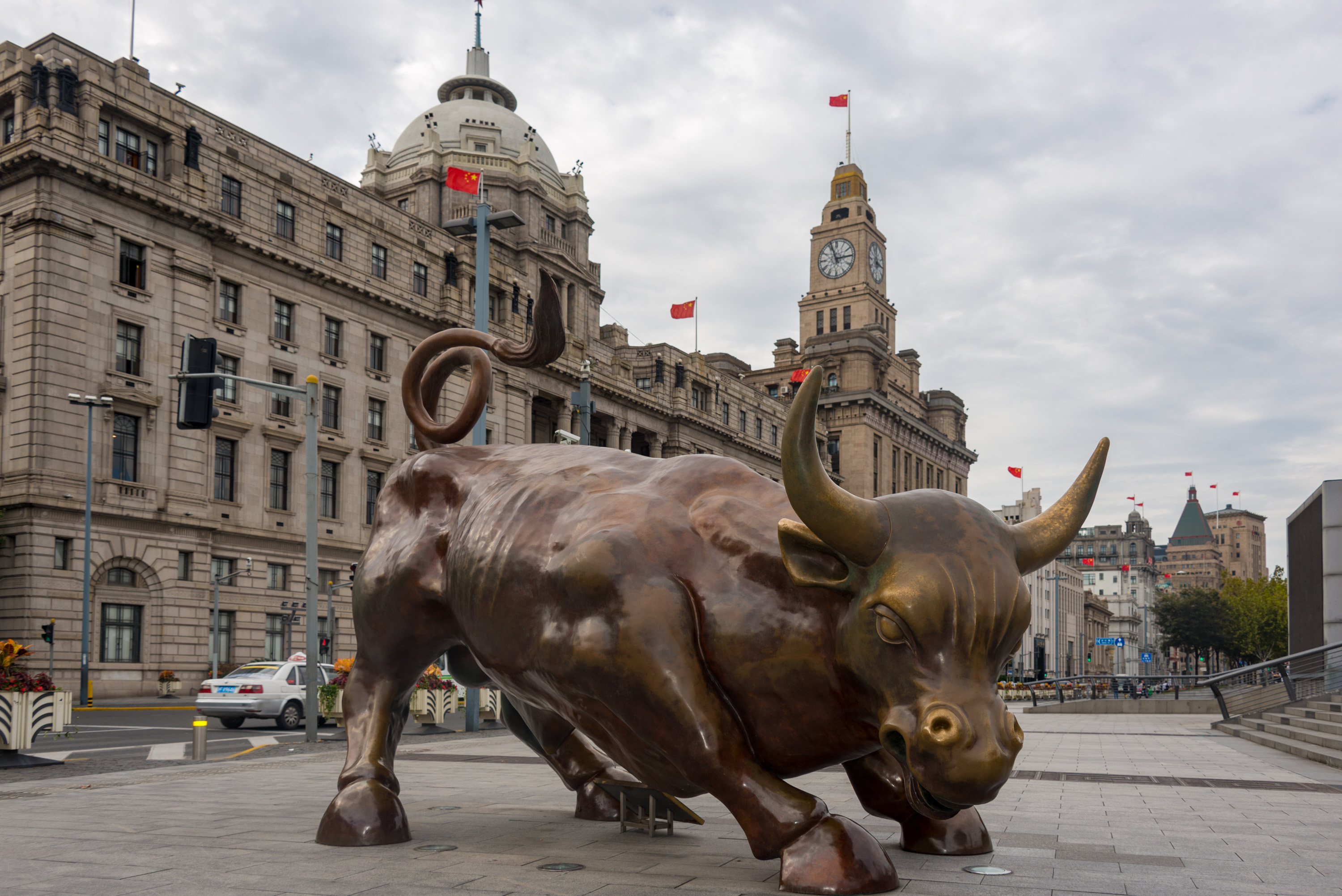
The Bund Financial Square features a bull statue

A stampede occurred on December 31, 2014, at 11:36 p.m. in the waterfront. At least 36 people were killed and 47 injured in the incident. The primary incident took place near Chen Yi Square, where a large crowd, estimated at 300,000, had gathered for the new year celebration.

The bund is one of the most prominent features when viewed from the Shanghai World Financial Center in Pudong and its observation deck on the 100th floor.

== Layout ==
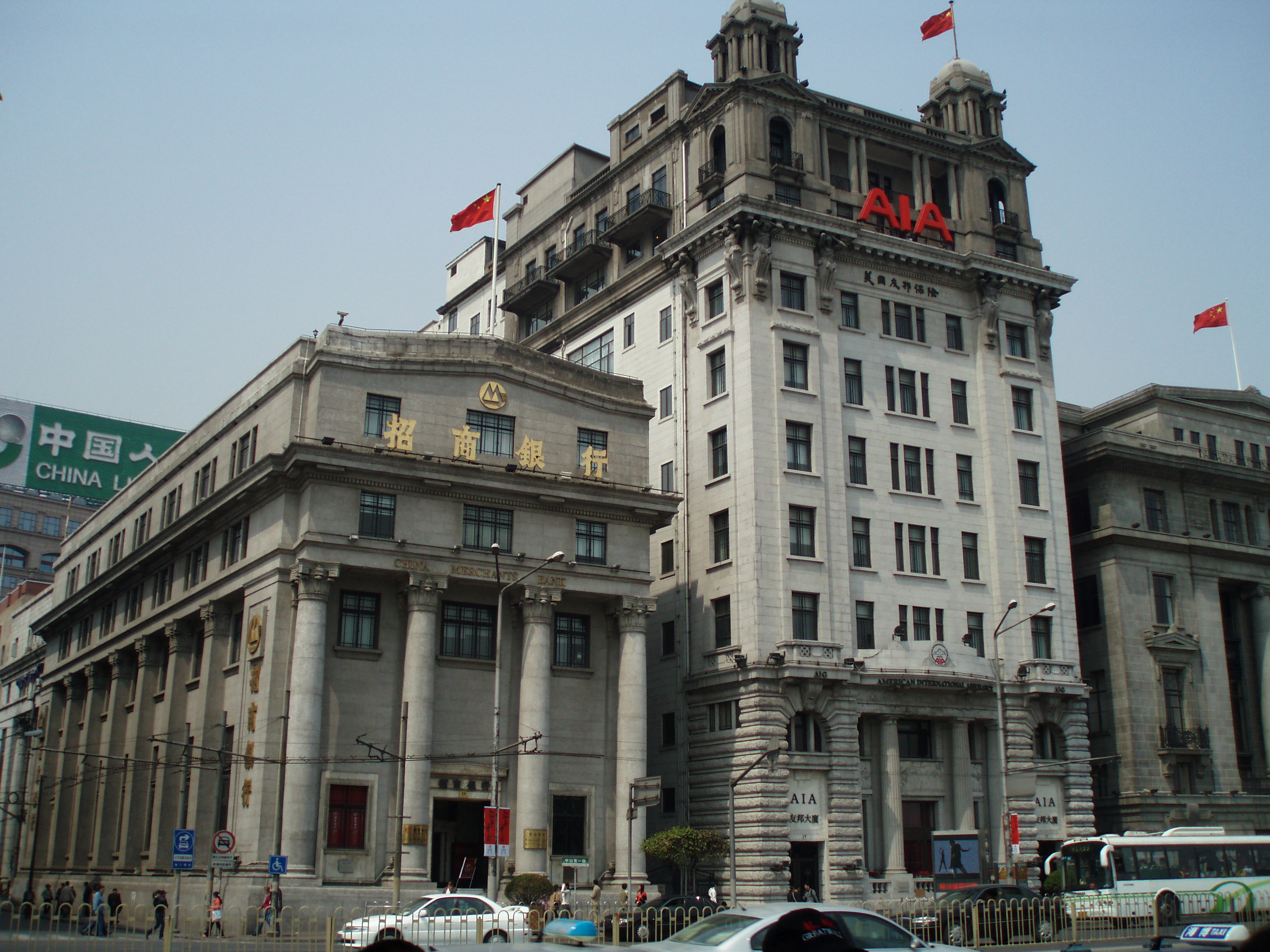
The China Merchant Bank

The Bund stretches one mile (1.6 km) along the bank of the Huangpu River. Traditionally, the Bund begins at Yan'an Road (formerly Edward VII Avenue) in the south and ends at Waibaidu Bridge (formerly Garden Bridge) in the north, which crosses Suzhou Creek.

The Bund centres on a stretch of the Zhongshan Road, named after Sun Yat-sen. Zhongshan Road is a largely circular road which formed the traditional conceptual boundary of Shanghai city "proper". To the west of this stretch of the road stands some 52 buildings of various Western classical and modern styles which is the main feature of the Bund (see Architecture and buildings below). To the east of the road was formerly a stretch of parkland culminating at Huangpu Park. (This park is the site of the infamous sign reported to have proclaimed "no dogs or Chinese", although this exact wording never existed. Further information, including an image of the sign, can be found at the article on Huangpu Park.) This area is now much reduced due to the expansion of Zhongshan Road. Further east is a tall levee, constructed in the 1990s to ward off flood waters. The construction of this high wall has dramatically changed the appearance of the Bund.

Near the Nanjing Road intersection stands the only bronze statue along the Bund, a statue of military officer Chen Yi, who served as the first Communist mayor of Shanghai. At the northern end of The Bund, along the riverfront, is Huangpu Park, in which is situated the Shanghai People's Heroes Memorial Tower — a tall, abstract concrete tower constructed by the Shanghai government in 1993 to serve as a memorial commemorating Chinese revolutionary martyrs, as well as those who have died fighting natural disasters in China.

== Architecture and buildings ==
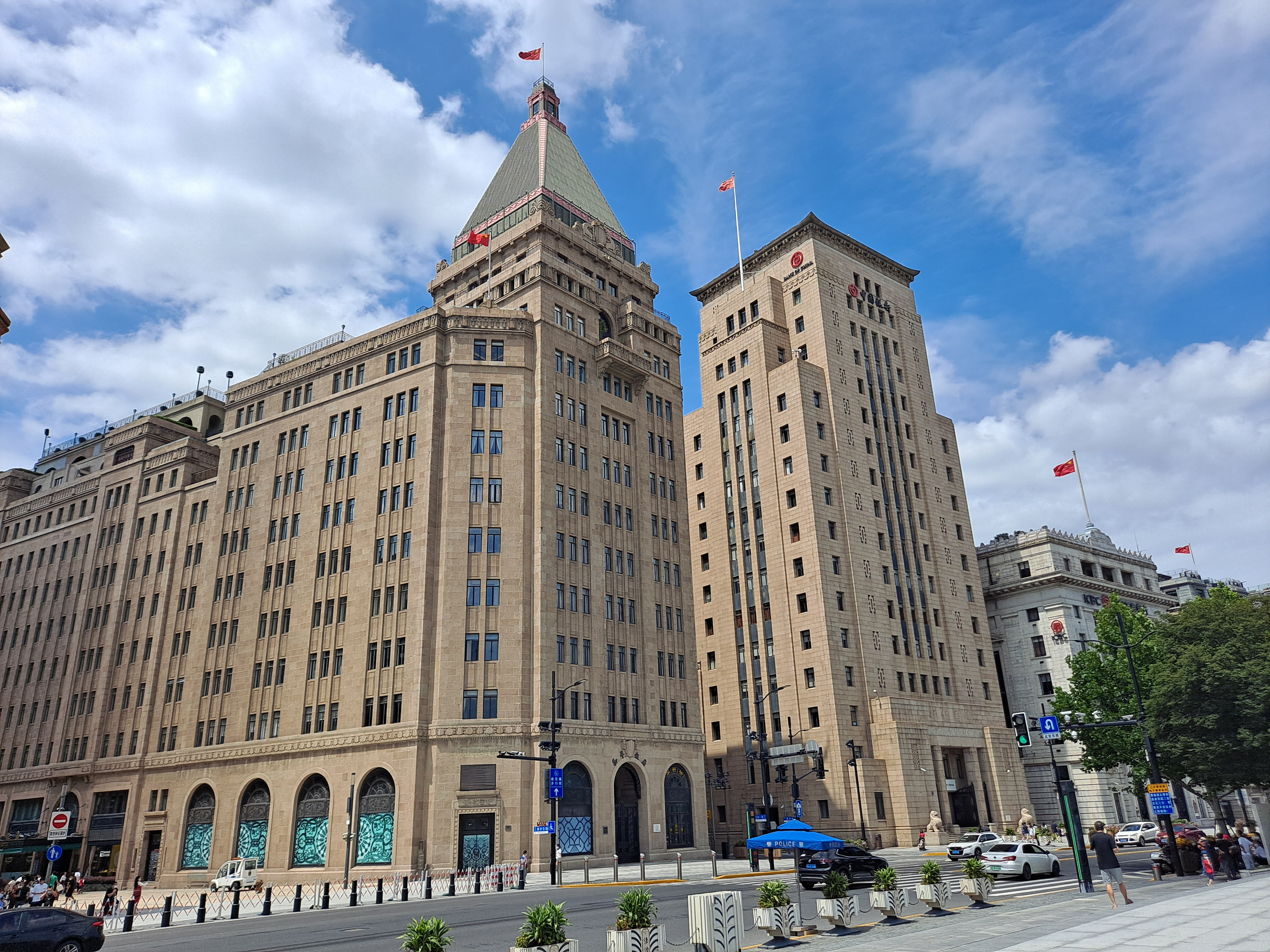
The Peace Hotel (green steepled building), formerly known as Sassoon House, one of the most famous buildings on the Bund

The Bund houses 52 buildings of various architectural styles, generally Eclecticist, but with some buildings displaying predominantly Romanesque Revival, Gothic Revival, Renaissance Revival, Baroque Revival, Neo-Classical or Beaux-Arts styles, and a number in Art Deco style (Shanghai has one of the richest collections of Art Deco architectures in the world). From the south, the main buildings are:

- American Club at 209 Fuzhou Rd – General Claire Chennault, then executive director of China Post 1, used the premises until 1948. Built by László Hudec of Curry & Co. between 1923 and 1925 in the American Georgian Style. Originally built as an all-male club after purchasing the site in 1922, it was a popular club for expatriates. A six-story building plus basement, around 1000m^{2} per floor, designed in the common steel and concrete construction prevalent along The Bund area of Shanghai. Containing bars, billiard room and 50 bedrooms there was also a rooftop garden.
- Asia Building (No. 1, The Bund), originally the McBain Building, housed the Shanghai offices of Royal Dutch Shell and Asiatic Petroleum Company.
- Shanghai Club (No. 2, The Bund), which was the principal social club for British nationals in Shanghai. Since 2010 the Waldorf-Astoria Shanghai Hotel.
- Union Building (No. 3, The Bund), previously housed a number of insurance companies, and is now a shopping centre.
- The Mercantile Bank of India, London and China building (No. 4, The Bund), housed the Mercantile Bank of India, London and China, built between 1916 and 1918.
- Nissin Building (No. 5, The Bund), housed a Japanese shipping company.
- Imperial Bank of China Building (No. 6, The Bund), housed the first Chinese-owned bank in China, and is now HSBC's Shanghai branch.
- Great Northern Telegraph Building (No. 7, The Bund), housed Great Northern Telegraph Company. Site of the first telephone switch in Shanghai in 1882.
- China Merchants Steam Navigation Company Building (No. 9, The Bund), currently housed the China Merchants Group, also houses the Shanghai flagship store for Dolce & Gabbana.
- The HSBC Building (No. 12, The Bund), now used by the Shanghai Pudong Development Bank, was once the Shanghai headquarters of the Hongkong and Shanghai Banking Corporation, which failed to reach a deal with the Shanghai government to buy the building again in the 1990s, when the Shanghai government moved out of the building that they had used since the 1950s. The present building was completed in 1923. At the time, it was called "the most luxurious building between the Suez Canal and the Bering Strait". Its famous ceiling mosaics have been fully restored, and can be viewed inside the entrance hall.
- The Customs House (No. 13, The Bund), was built in 1927 on the site of an earlier, traditional Chinese-style customs house. The clock and bell was built in England and in imitation of Big Ben.
- China Bank of Communications Building (No. 14, The Bund), was the last building to be built on the Bund before the founding of the People's Republic. It now houses the Shanghai Council of Trade Unions.
- Russo-Chinese Bank Building (No. 15, The Bund) is now the China Foreign Exchange Trade System (CFETS; previously Shanghai Gold Exchange).
- Bank of Taiwan Building (No. 16, The Bund) is now the China Merchants Bank.
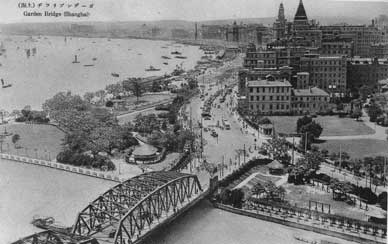
  View towards the Bund from Broadway Mansions in the early 20th century
- North China Daily News Building (No. 17, The Bund) housed the most influential English-language newspaper in Shanghai at the time. Today it houses AIA Insurance.
- Chartered Bank Building (No. 18, The Bund) housed the Shanghai headquarters of what became Standard Chartered Bank the building now houses designer shops, the restaurant Mr & Mrs Bund, and a creative exhibition space. HQ of Chipolbrok Chinese-Polish shipping company (1962–1998).
- Palace Hotel (No. 19, The Bund), today forms part of the Peace Hotel.
- Sassoon House (No. 20, The Bund), with the attached Cathay Hotel, was built by Sir Victor Sassoon. It was, and still is today, famous for its jazz band in its cafe. The top floor originally housed Sassoon's private apartment. Today, it forms the other part of the Peace Hotel.
- Bank of China Building (No. 23, The Bund) housed the headquarters of the Bank of China. The stunted appearance of the building is attributed to Sassoon's insistence that no other building on the Bund could rise higher than his.
- Yokohama Specie Bank Building (No. 24, The Bund) housed the Japanese Yokohama Specie Bank until 1945, today housed a Shanghai branch of the Industrial and Commercial Bank of China.
- Yangtze Insurance Building (No. 26, The Bund) today houses a Shanghai branch of the Agricultural Bank of China.
- Jardine Matheson Building (No. 27, The Bund) housed the then-powerful Jardine Matheson company. Today it houses a Rolex store on the ground floor, offices, and the House of Roosevelt, a bar and restaurant.
- Glen Line Building (No. 2 East Beijing Road) today houses the Shanghai Clearing House.
- Banque de l'Indochine Building (No. 29, The Bund) housed the French bank, Banque de l'Indochine.
- Consulate-General of the United Kingdom (No. 33, The Bund) housed the Consulate-General of the United Kingdom. The building has been renovated and in 2010 re-opened as No. 1 Waitanyuan, a private dining facility for government. Part of the site has also been used to build the Peninsula Hotel, Shanghai which opened in 2010.
- Gutzlaff Signal Tower also known as the Bund Weather Tower, originally provided weather information to ships on the Huangpu River with the current structure dating from 1907.
- West Bund Art & Design (Chinese: 西岸艺术与设计博览会) hosts an annual international contemporary art fair held Shanghai, China during November.
- The Water House

== Transport ==
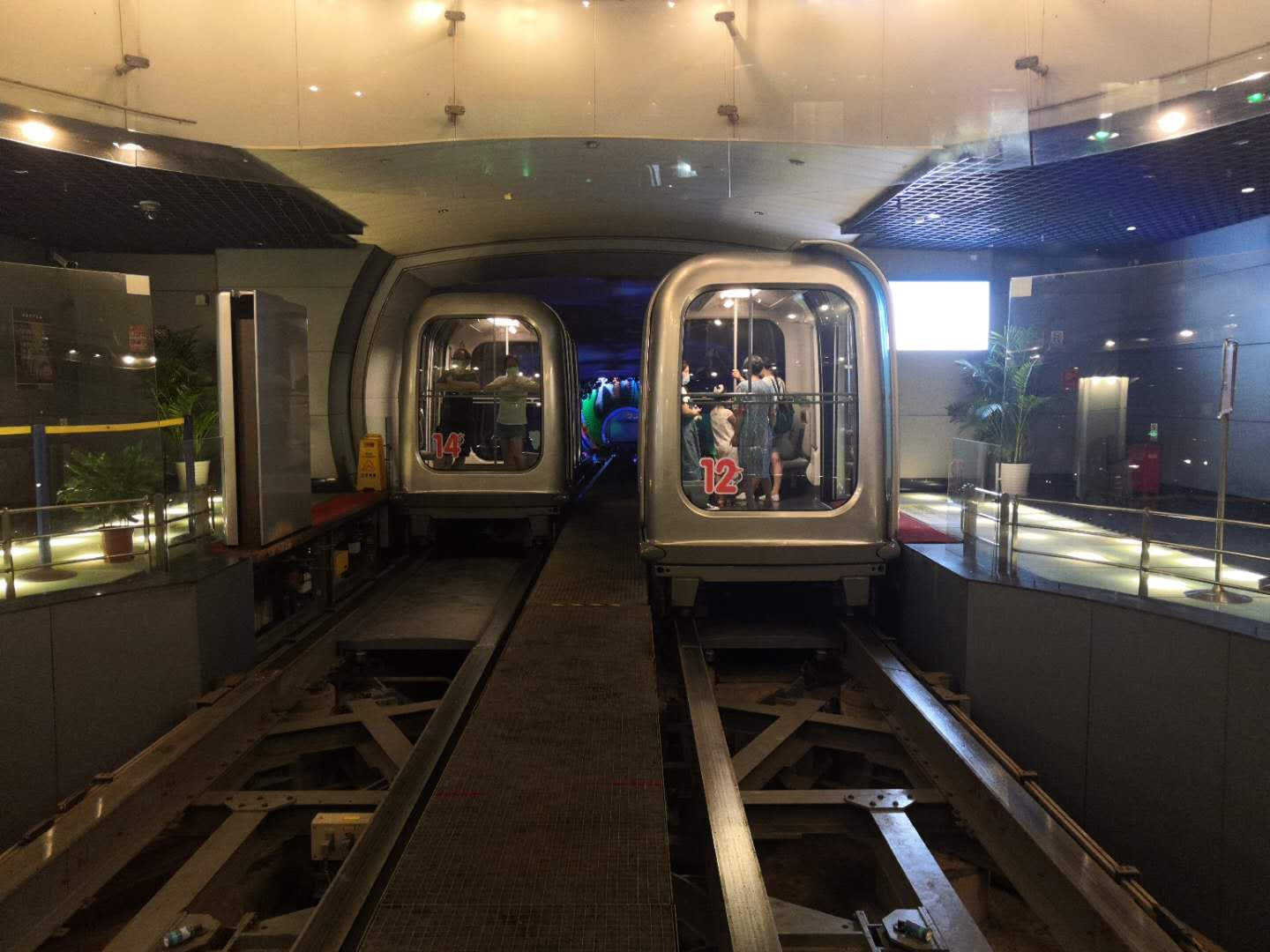
The Bund sightseeing tunnel

While Shanghai Metro Line 2 crosses the Bund, there are no plans to build a station on the Bund. The closest station is East Nanjing Road, about a five-minute walk up Nanjing Road. East-1 Zhongshan Road is a major bus route near the Bund.

There were previously frequent ferry services operating by Shanghai Ferry from wharves on and near the Bund. The most popular remaining ferry service runs from Jinling Road wharf, near the southern end of the Bund, to Dongchang Road wharf, at the southern end of Lujiazui across the river. A full fare ride on the ferry costs 2 RMB. A number of companies offer Huangpu River cruises (boat tours) departing from the wharf; all of the major buildings in the Bund, and in Pudong, are illuminated each evening.

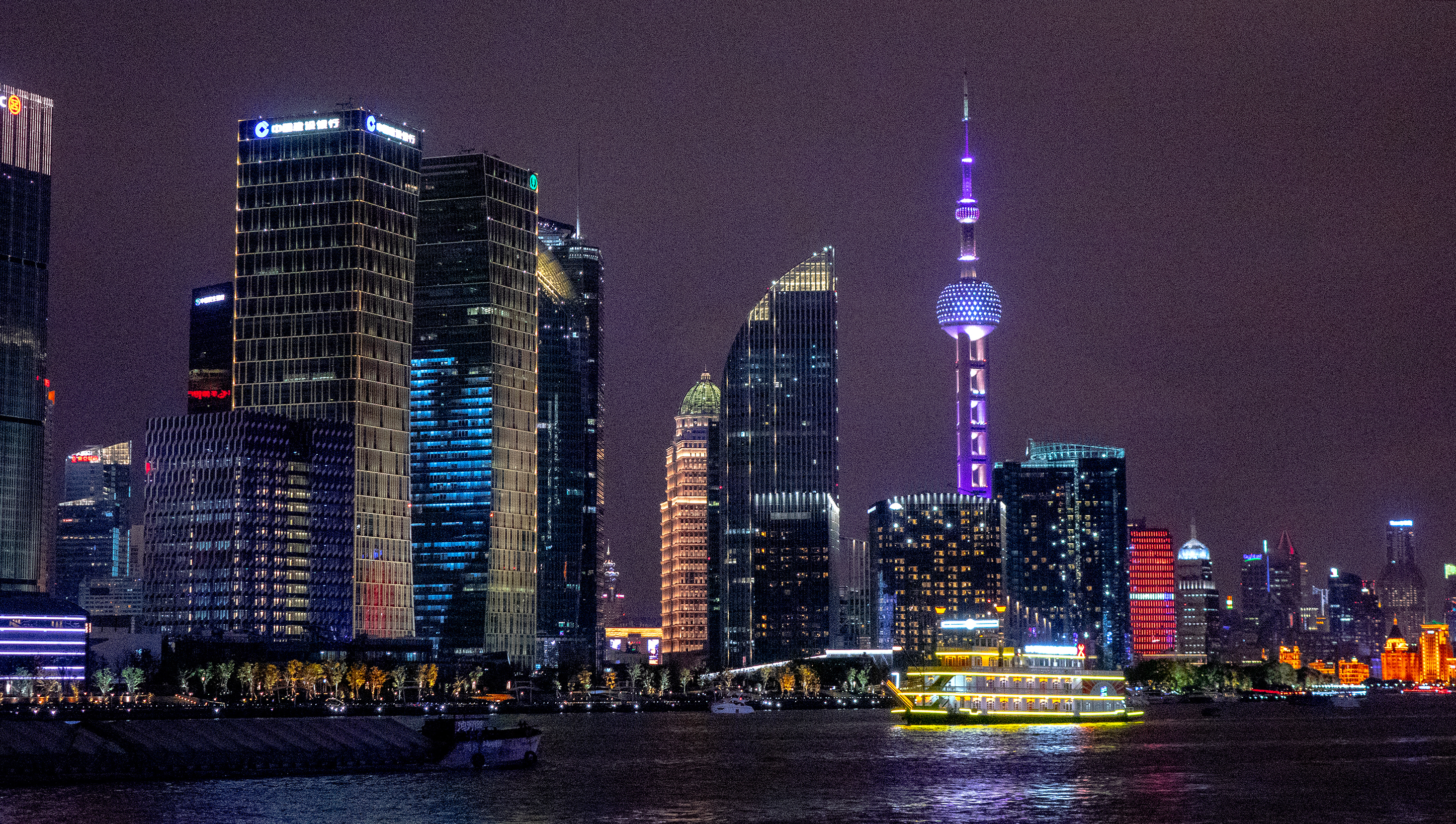
One of the many cruise boats that ply the river, offering views of the Bund and Pudong

Bund Sightseeing Tunnel (外滩观光隧道), a pedestrian transit tunnel under the riverbed crosses the Huangpu River from the Bund. Passengers board slow-moving SK people movers which travel along the tunnel, with light effects projected onto the walls of the tunnel. These effects are marketed as a tourist attraction; the charge for the tunnel is ten times the fee for crossing the river on Line 2 and 20 times the 2 RMB fee for crossing by ferry.

== In popular culture ==
There are numerous studies in Chinese and English, and many popular representations. The Bund was featured in the 1984 novel Empire of the Sun by British author J. G. Ballard, based on his experiences as a boy during the Japanese invasion and occupation. The book was made into a film by Steven Spielberg. The opening pages of the 1999 novel Cryptonomicon by Neal Stephenson are set on the Bund in November 1941, as civil order collapses under the threat of Japanese invasion.

The Bund is a setting (and namesake) of the Hong Kong television series The Bund (1980) and film Shanghai Grand (1996). The story of both involve pre-World War II era gangsters competing for control of the Bund. "The Bund" is a song composed by electronic music group The Shanghai Restoration Project released on the group's first eponymous release, inspired by the Shanghai jazz bands of the 1930s. An instrumental version of the song titled "The Bund (Instrumental)" was released in 2008 on the group's Day – Night (Instrumentals) album.

The Bund was featured in the premiere of The Amazing Race 21, the finale of The Amazing Race: China Rush 1, and the premiere of The Amazing Race: China Rush 3. The Bund is one of the playable stages in The King of Fighters XIV.

== Gallery ==
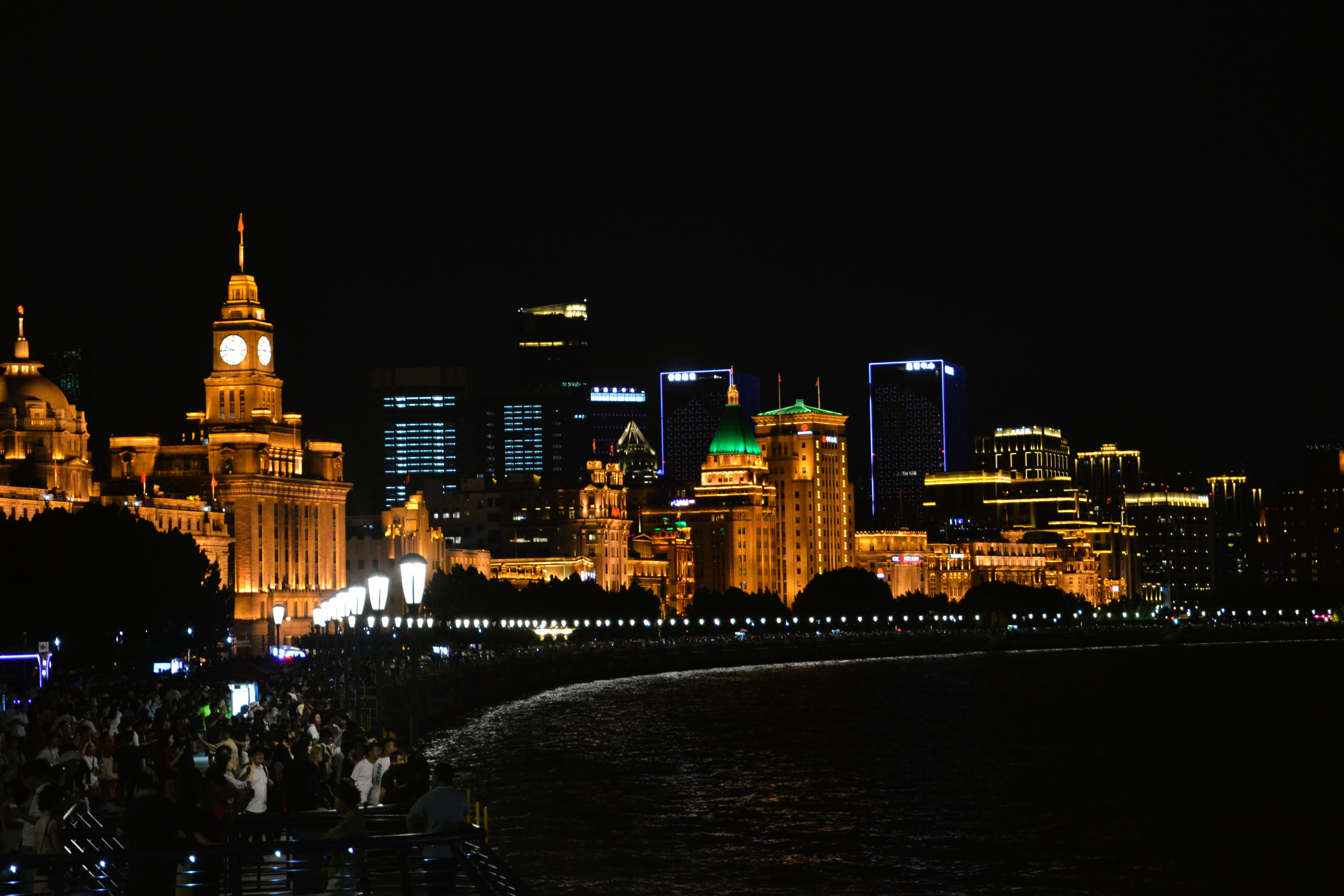
Bund at night

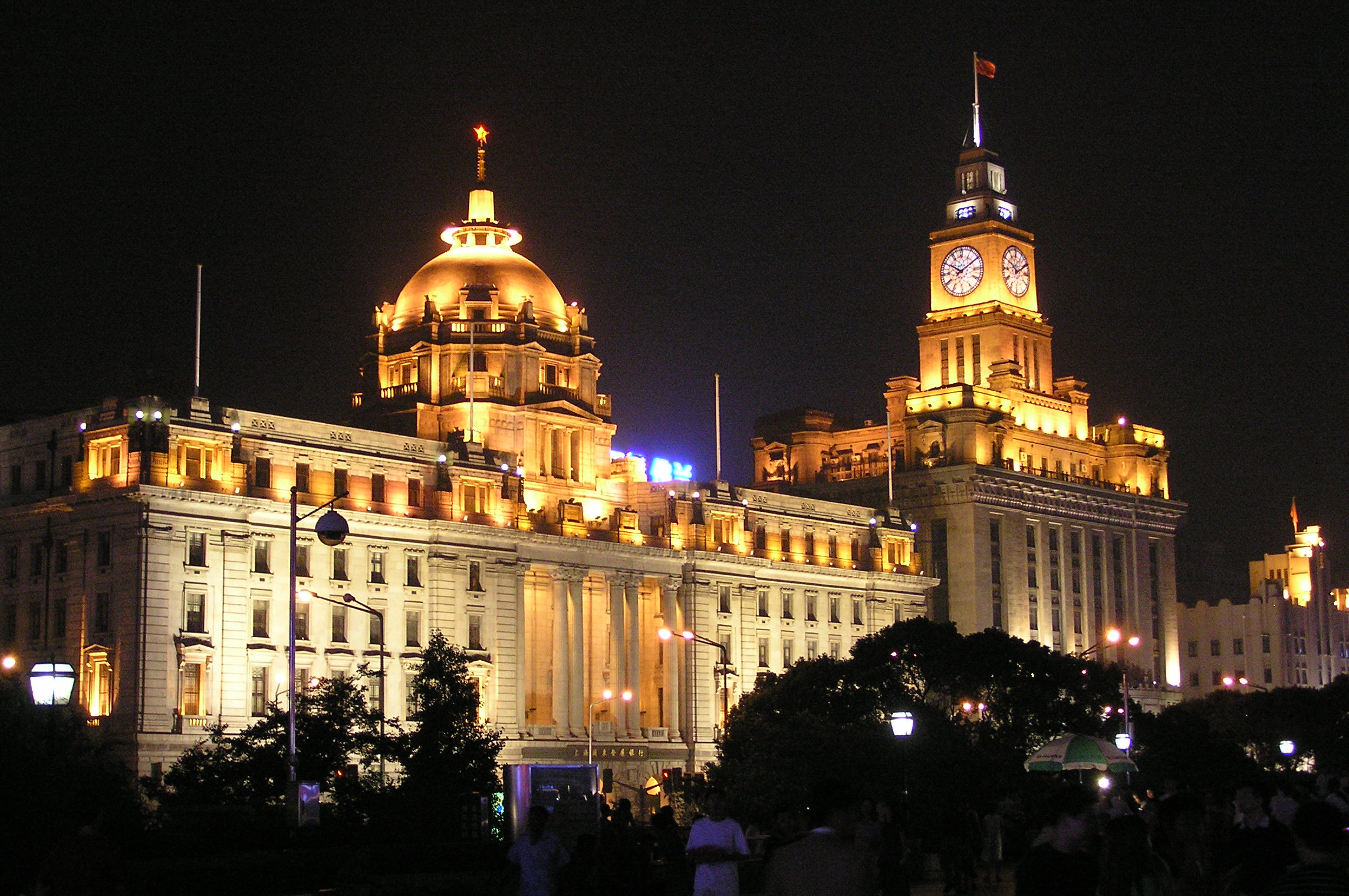
Hong Kong and Shanghai Bank building and the Shanghai Custom House building

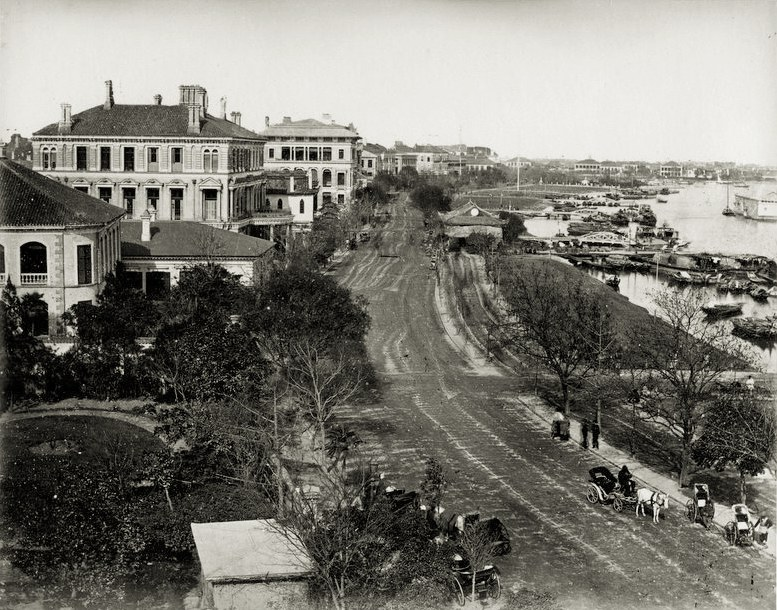
Circa 1890s

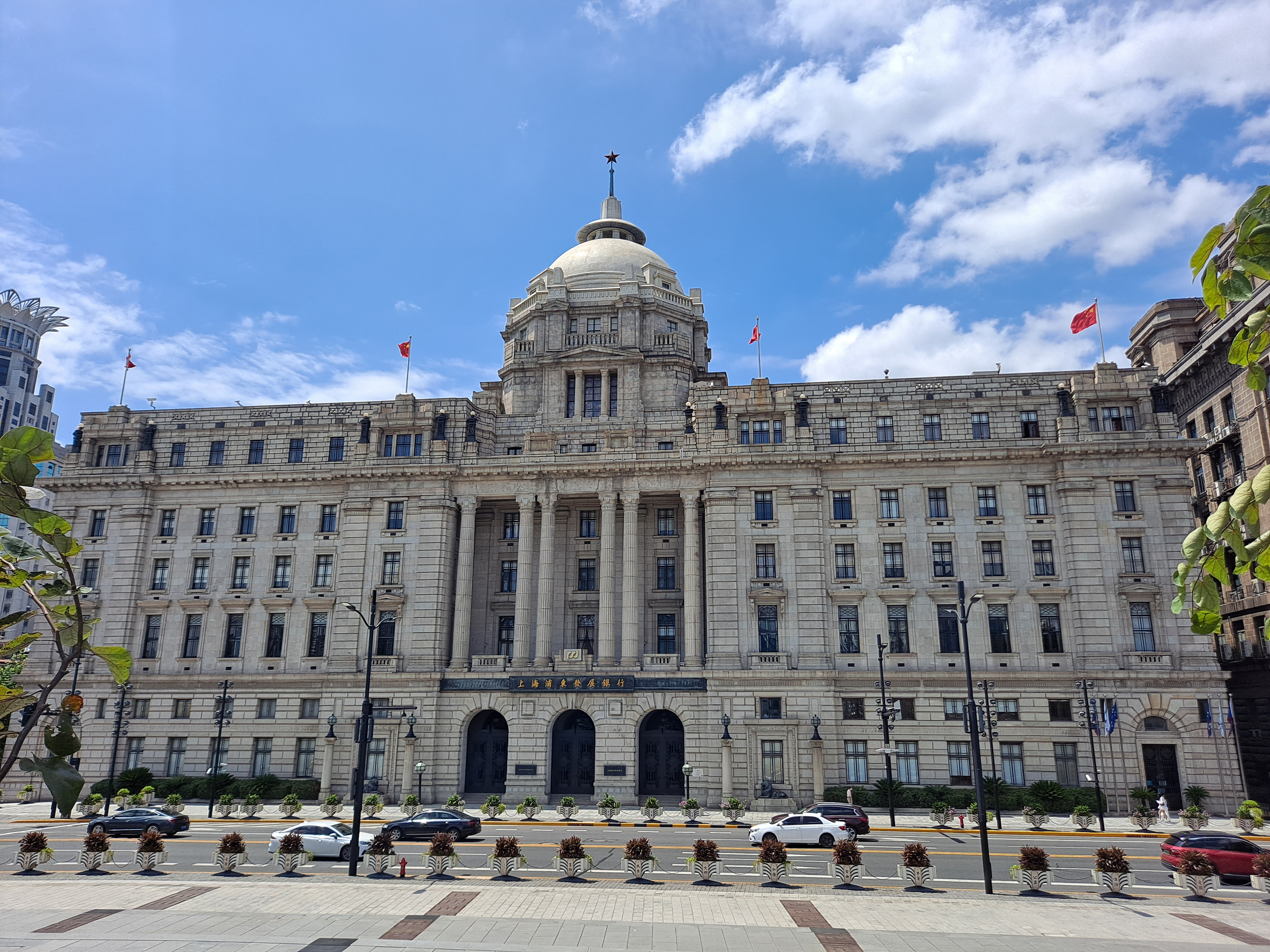
HSBC Building

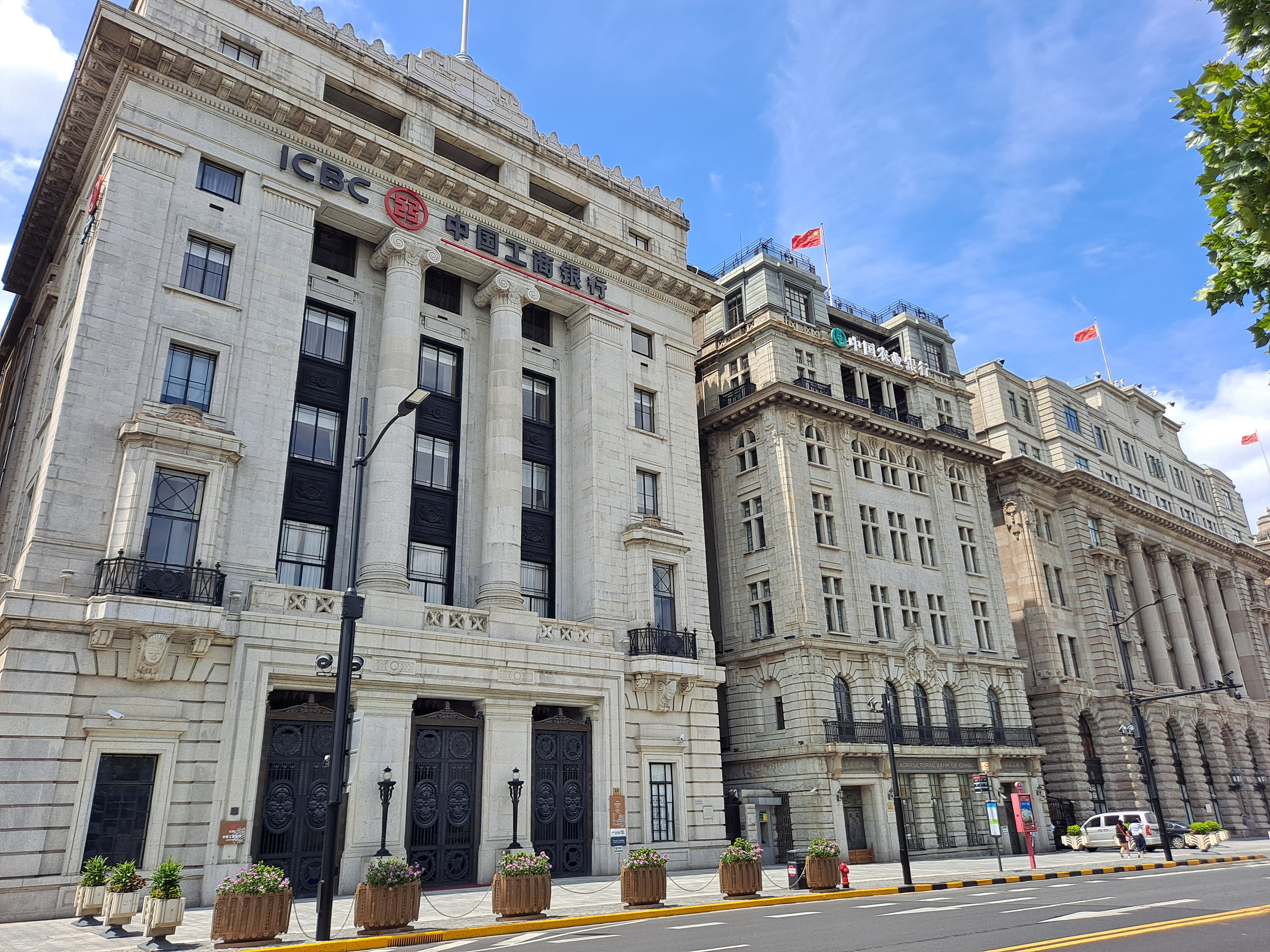
Former Yokohama Specie Bank Building

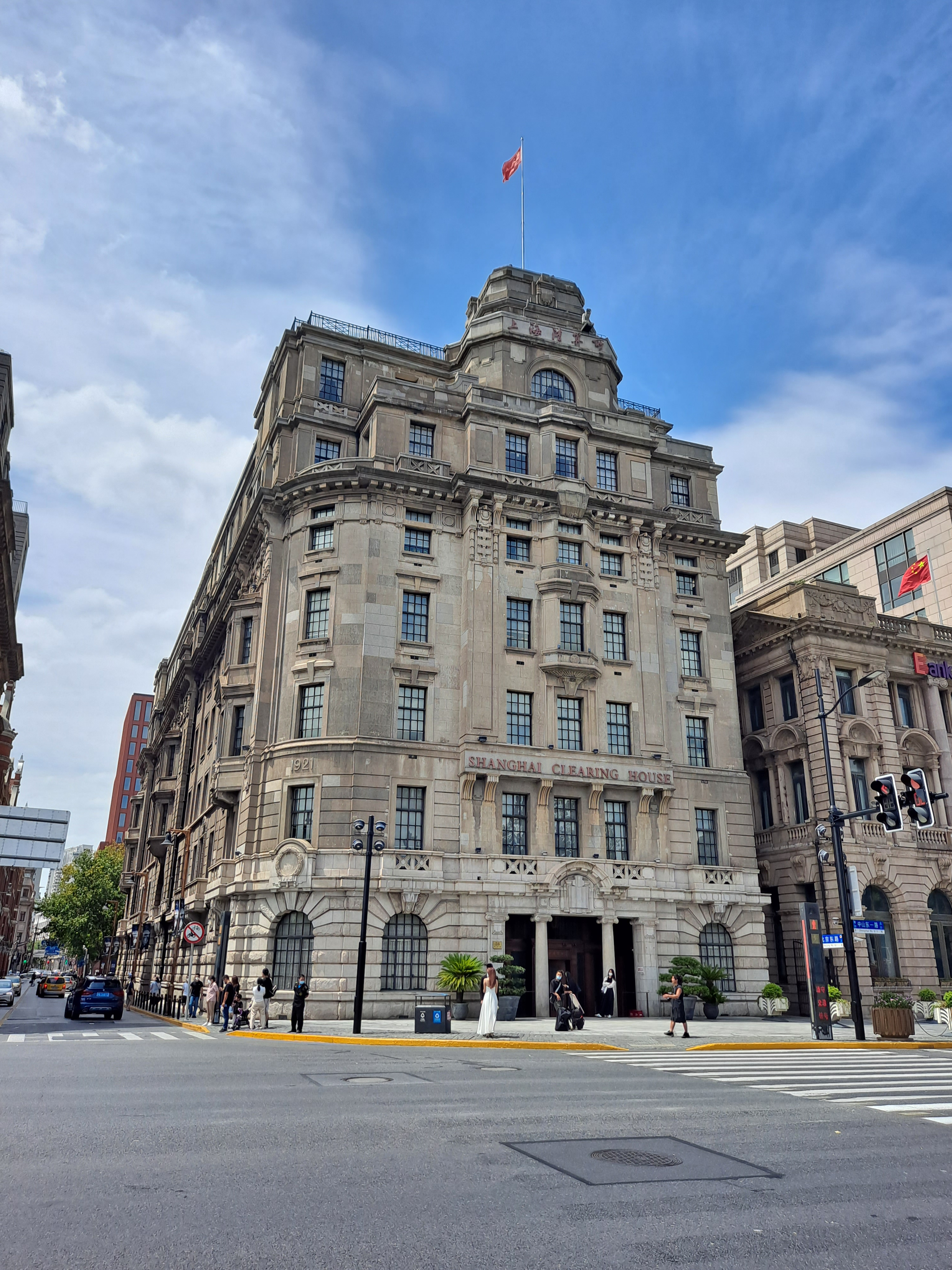
Glen Line Building

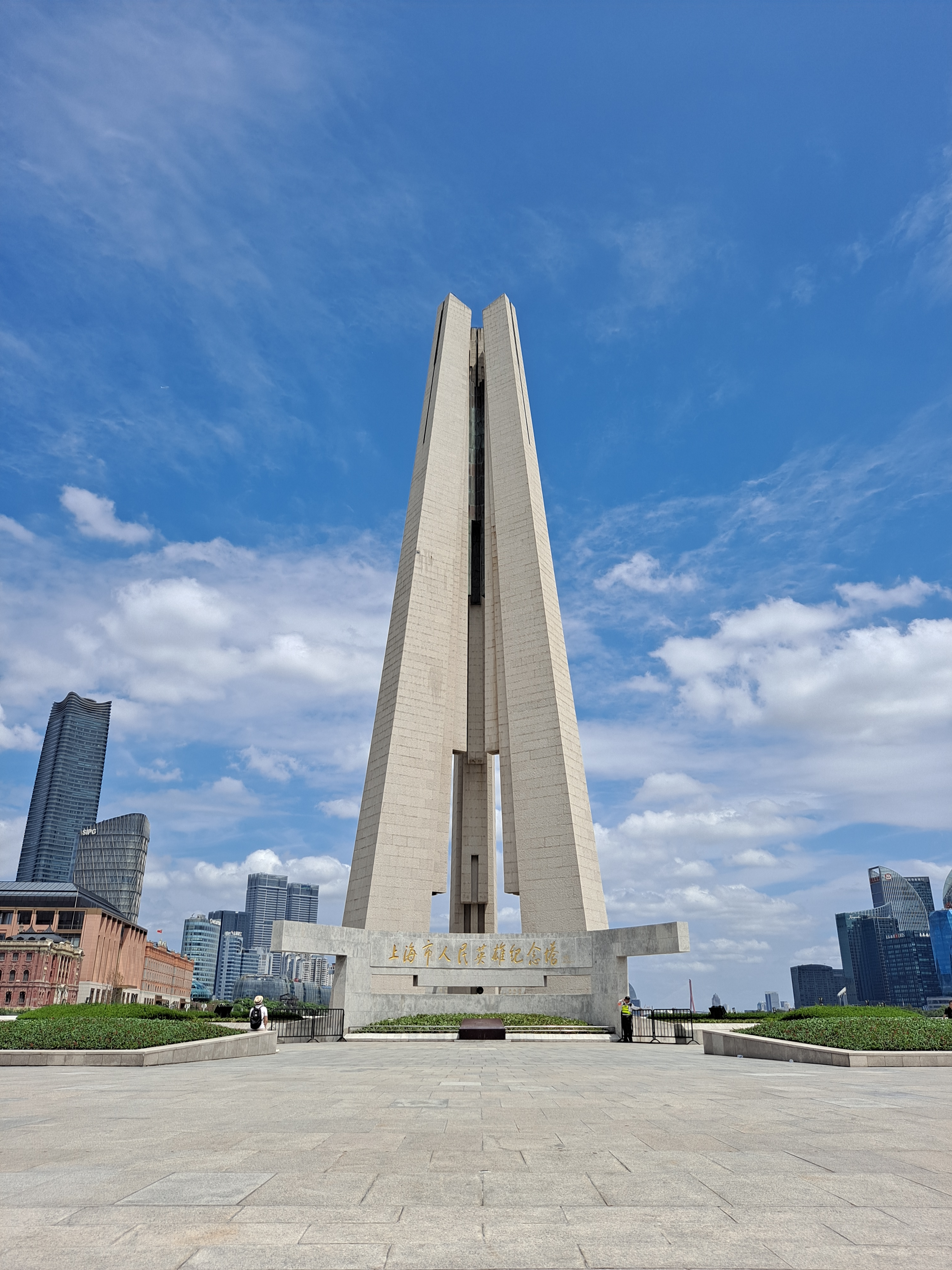
Monument to the People's Heroes, Shanghai

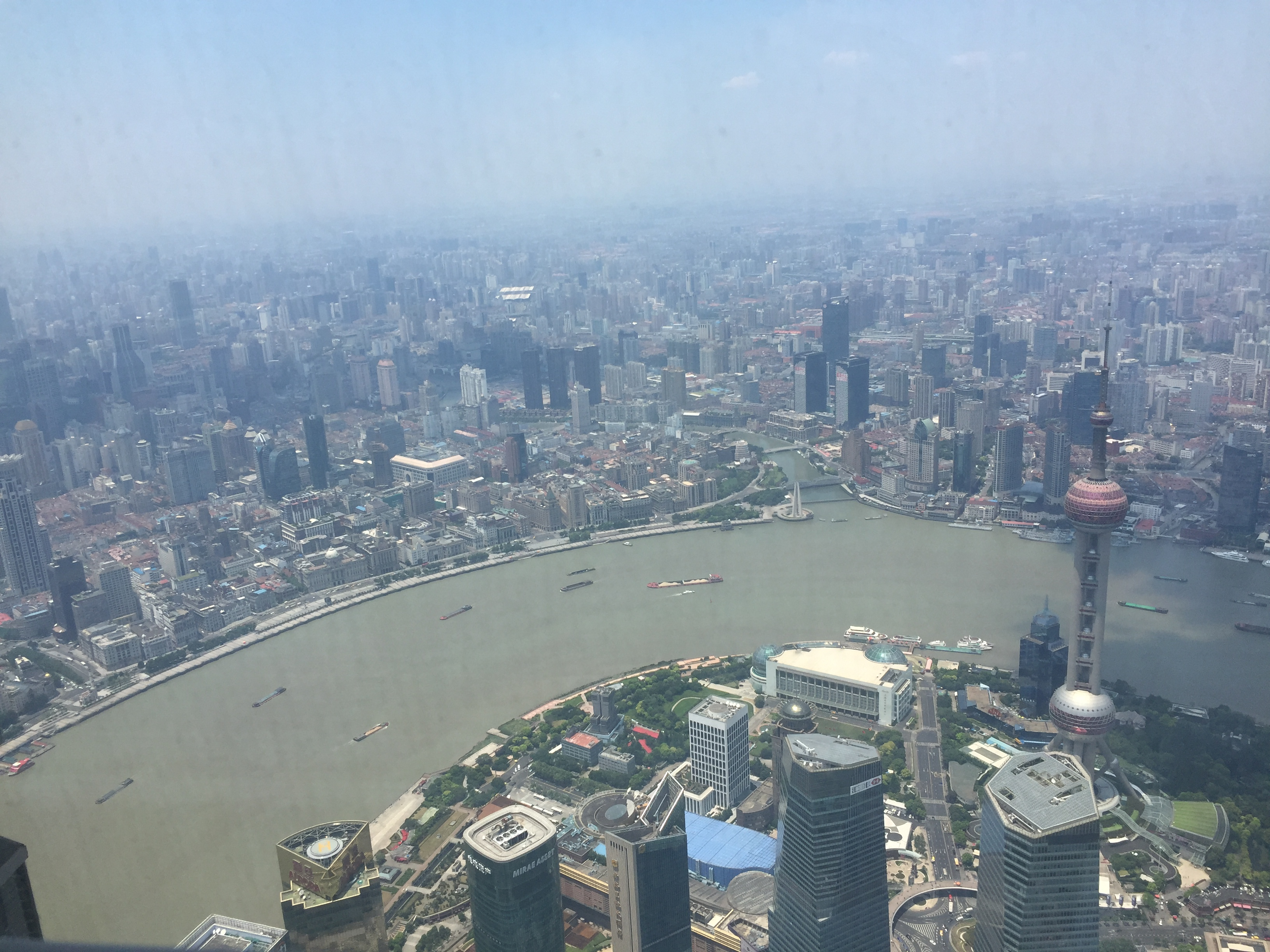
The Bund seen from the Shanghai Tower Observation Deck

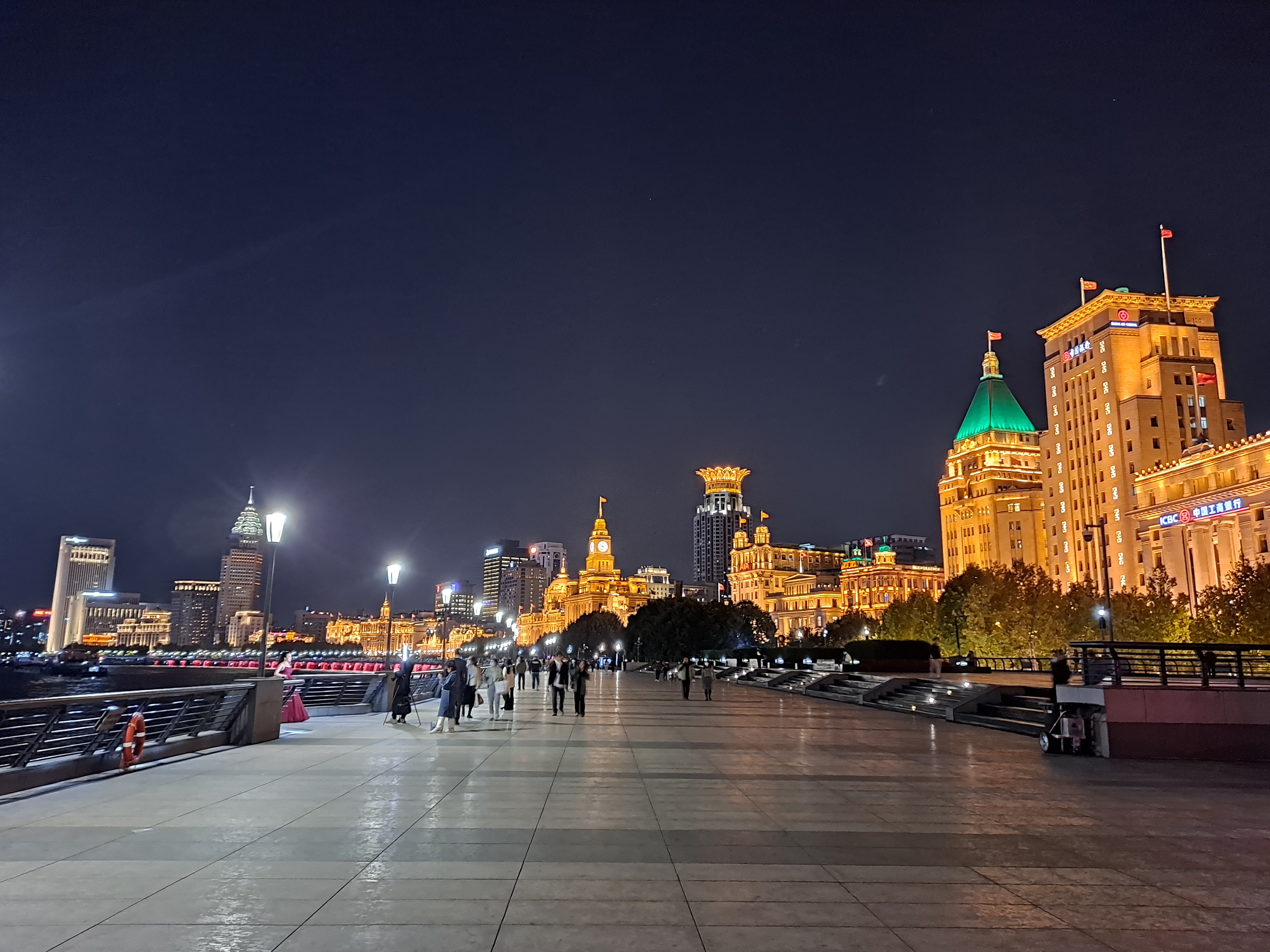
The Bund at night
