= Bank of China Building, Shanghai =

Building in Shanghai, China

Coordinates: 31°14′22″N 121°29′23″E

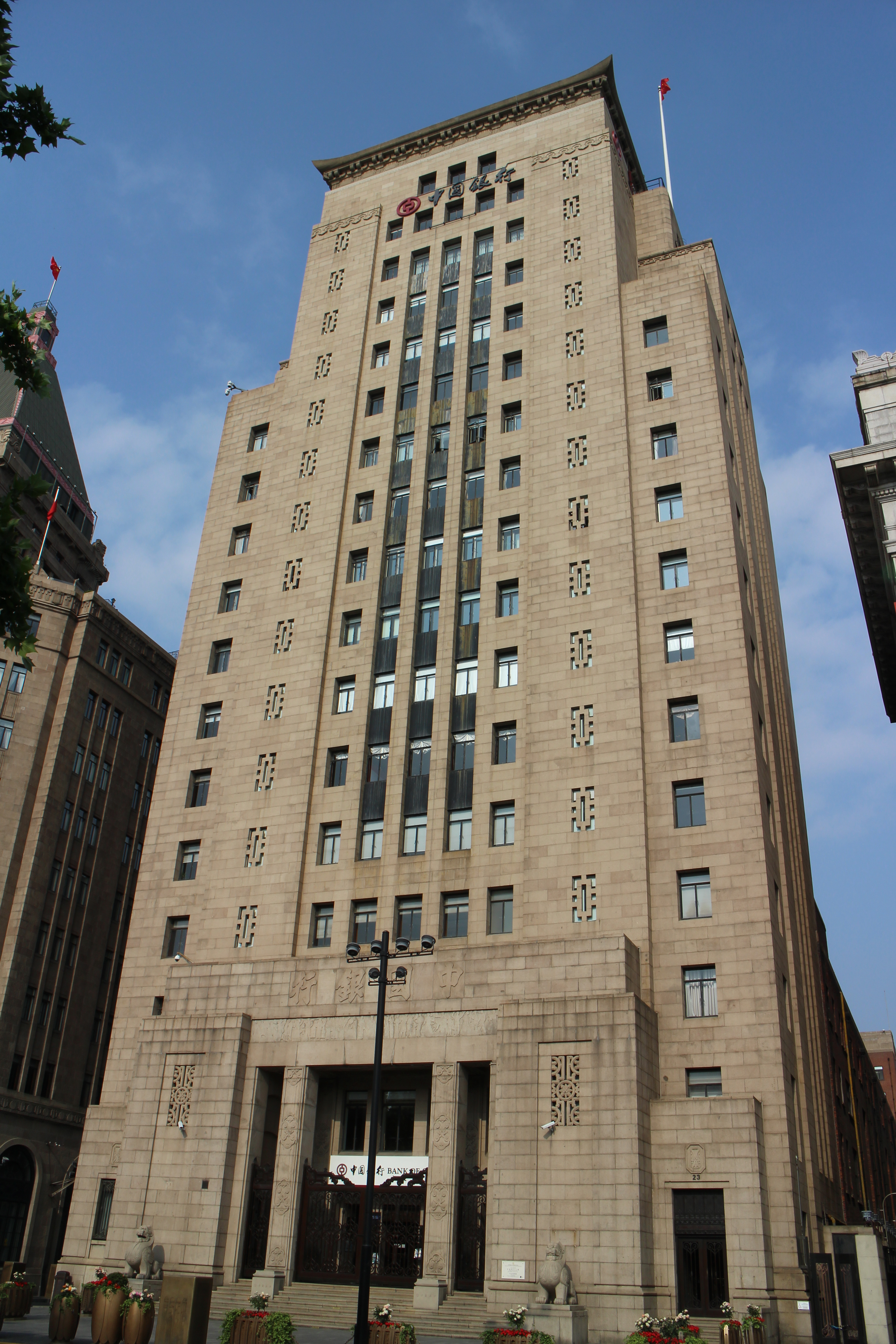
Bank of China Building in 2025

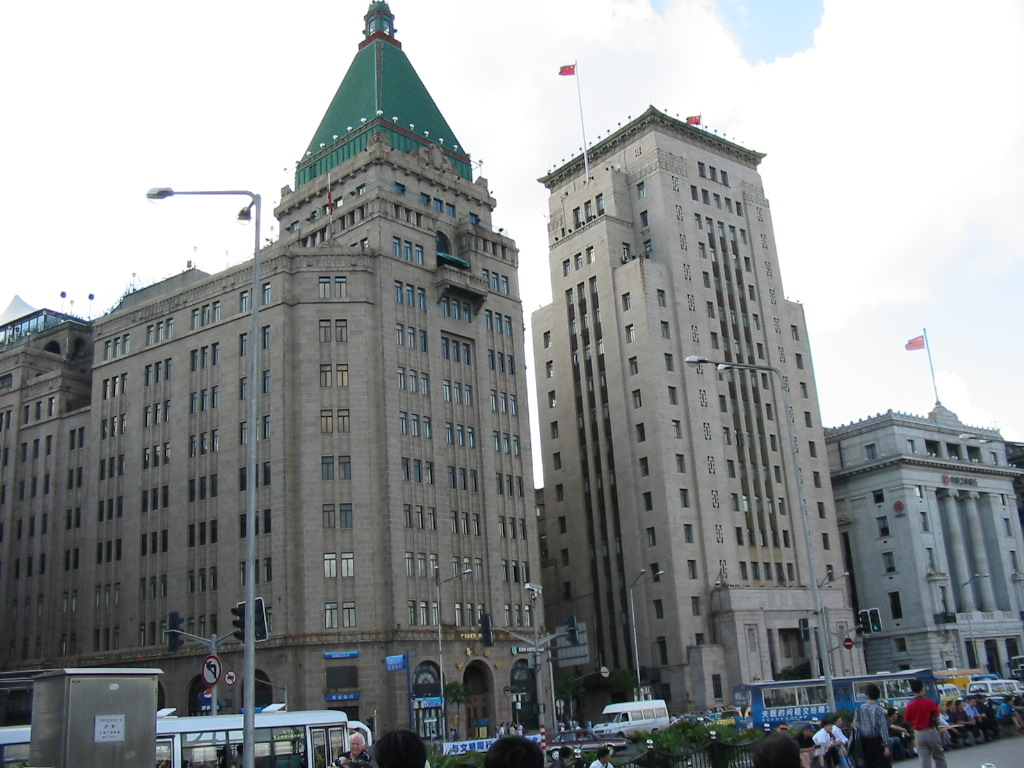
From left to right: The Peace Hotel, Old Bank of China Building (second building) and Yokohama Specie Bank Building

The Bank of China Building is a tower located at No. 23 on the Bund, in Shanghai, People's Republic of China. Previously the headquarters of the Bank of China, it now houses the Shanghai Branch of the Bank of China.

It was built on the site of the old German Club (c. 1907). It housed the headquarters of the Bank of China. The stunted appearance of the building is attributed to Victor Sassoon's insistence that no other building on the Bund could rise higher than his.

== History ==
No. 23, the Bund was previously the German Club. During World War I, the Chinese government declared war on Germany, and confiscated the German Club as enemy assets. At the end of World War I, the Bank of China purchased the property from the government for 630,000 silver yuan.

In 1928, the Bank of China moved its headquarters from Beijing to Shanghai. The Bank of China purchased land in Jinkee Road (now Dianchi Road) and Yuenmingyuen Road (now Yuanmingyuan Road) in 1930 to house its headquarters. From then on, the Shanghai branch would each year set aside RMB 500,000 from its surplus, as the construction fund for a new headquarters building. In April 1934, the board of directors decided to construct an 18-floor building, for the office administration and operation of the Head Office and the Shanghai Branch, on the former German Club site. The estimated basic construction cost was 6 million silver yuan.

A primary reason why the bank officials wanted to have the building in the Bund concession was according to Zhang Jia'ao, the then president of the Bank of China, because "Bank of China had endured hardship and thrived. Since its infrastructure had been reformed and it was strong enough to compete with those European and American banks on the Bund, it needed a new building, which could symbolize modernity, soundness and international credit."

In the original design, this building had 34 floors and would be the highest in the Far East. Actually, the current foundation was still strong enough for a 34-floor building. However, Victor Sassoon insisted that "any house built next to my building is not allowed to be higher than the spire of the Sassoon House". The Municipal Council of the British concession refused to issue the construction permit with an excuse of "Chinese were poor in designing ability and the 34-story building would do harm to the foundations of the surrounding buildings". Finally, the Bank of China building was cut nearly half, with a top height 1 foot lower than the nearby Sassoon House.

In September 1934, Bank of China established a special Management Council to deal with the construction of the building, chaired by Tsuyee Pei, Head Office's Overseas Department manager and Shanghai Branch manager. Tsuyee Pei was the father of architect I. M. Pei, who would later design the Bank of China Tower, Hong Kong. The design drafts were jointly prepared by a famous Shanghai design firm Palmer & Turner and Mr. Lu Qianshou (also: Luke Him Sau 1904 - 1991), the Chief Architect of the Bank of China. Dao Kee Construction Co., Ltd, a local firm, won the bid by proposing a budget of RMB 1.813 million for the 18-month project.

In 1935, the government of the Republic of China started restructuring the Central Bank, Bank of China and Bank of Communications. Bank of China, whose stocks were 80% publicly owned, became the target of plunder by various powers. It was forced to add RMB 15 million government stocks, making its total capital RMB 40 million, half public and half government owned. With this, the control fell into the hands of the government and T. V. Soong became chairman of Bank of China.

On October 10, 1936, T. V. Soong presided over the foundation-laying ceremony of the Bank of China Tower at No. 23 on the Bund. On the day, the Shanghai Times carried a detailed report on the event. The original text reads:

"Bank of China to construct a building at Renji Road of the Bund. Our newspaper will keep you updated about its status. We are informed that the bank will hold a foundation-laying ceremony on 10:00 am today (Double Ten Festival). The presence of local financial professionals is appreciated.

The building was topped out in 1937. Right then, the Second Sino-Japanese War broke out, which postponed the completion. In 1941, it served as the office of the Central Reserve Bank of the Wang Jingwei Government; it had been turned over to the Central Bank after the victory against the Japanese. After several rounds of negotiations, Bank of China didn't move to that building till the New Year of 1946, ten years from the time it was built.

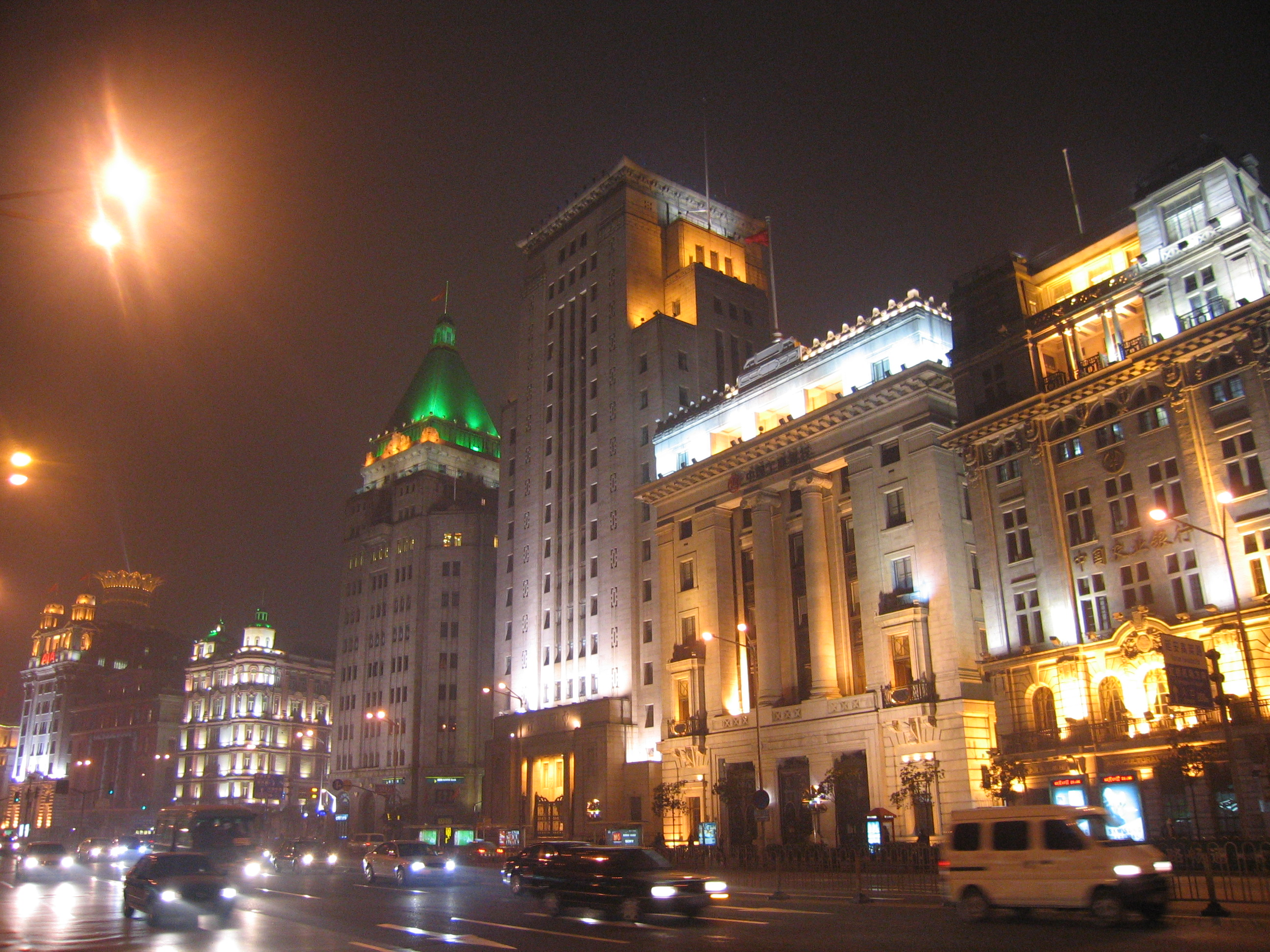
Night view
