= Glen Line Building =

1922 commercial building in Shanghai

Glen Line Building, Shanghai
- 格林邮船大楼
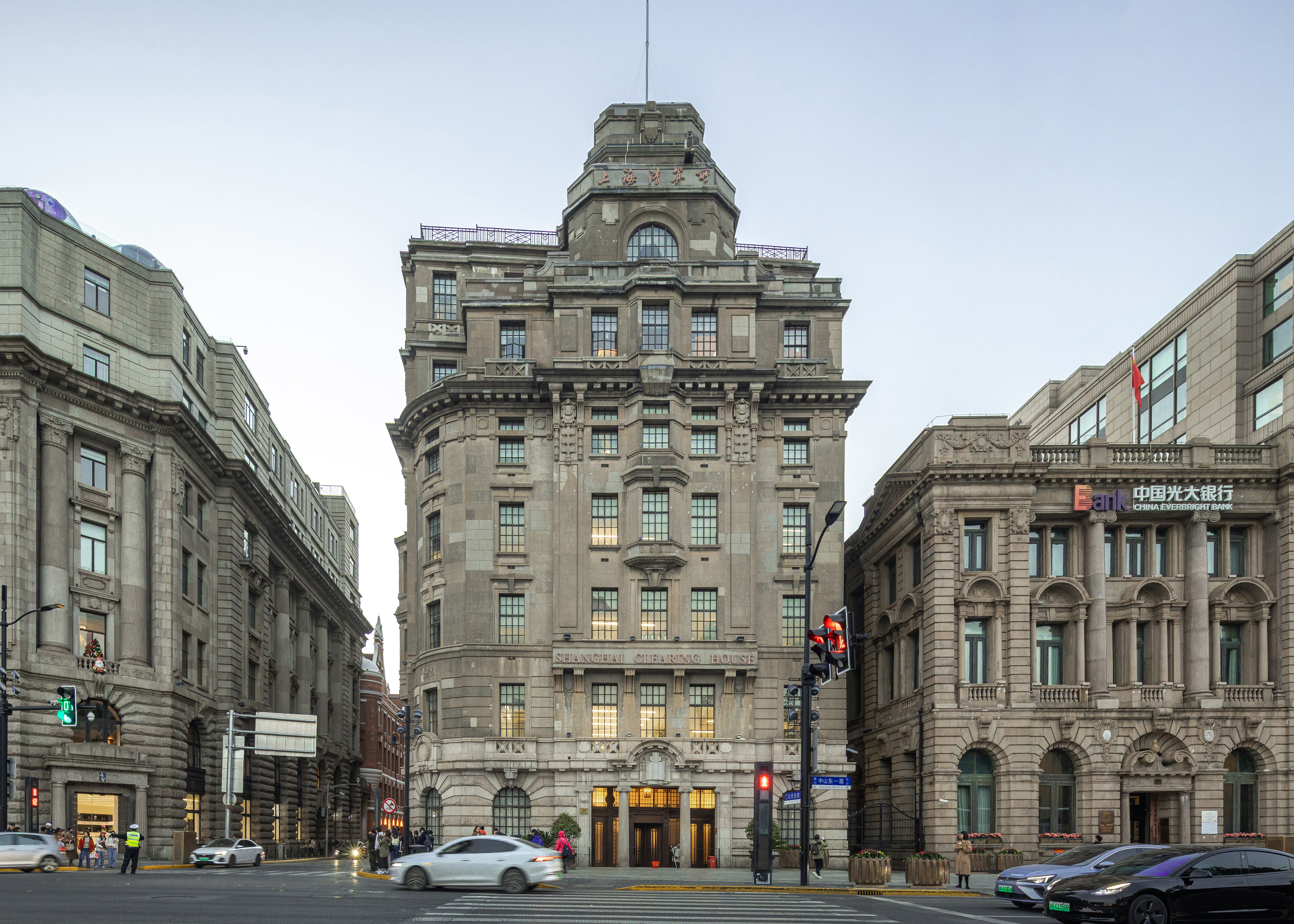
- The Glen Line Building in 2025
- Interactive map of the Glen Line Building, Shanghai area

General information
- Architectural style: Renaissance, Neoclassical
- Location: 2 Beijing East Road, The Bund, Huangpu, Shanghai, China
- Coordinates: 31.2428°N 121.4855°E
- Construction started: March 1920
- Completed: March 1922
- Owner: Shanghai Clearing House

Height
- Height: 27.5 m (90 ft)

Technical details
- Material: Reinforced concrete
- Floor count: 7
- Floor area: 11,181 m^{2} (120,350 sq ft)

Design and construction
- Architect: George Leopold Wilson
- Architecture firm: P&T Group
- 格林邮船大楼 (Chinese)
- Type: Important near-modern historical sites and representative buildings
- Location: Shanghai, China

History
- Built: 1922

Site notes
- Area: Huangpu, Shanghai
- Governing body: National Cultural Heritage Administration

Major cultural heritage sites under national-level protection
- Designated: 20 November 1996
- Reference no.: 4-220

The Glen Line Building (Chinese: 格林邮船大楼; pinyin: gélín yóuchuán dàlóu), also known as the United States Information Agency Building or Shanghai People's Radio Station Building, is a 7-floor building in Shanghai, China, which was built in the former Shanghai International Settlement in 1922. It was designed by architect George Leopold Wilson of the Palmer and Turner Hong Kong (now known as the P&T Group). It is a 'major cultural heritage site under national-level protection', and also an 'outstanding historic building' of Shanghai.

Occupying 1751 square meters, with a floor area of 11,181 m^{2} (120,350 sq ft), the Glen Line Building is No. 28 of The Bund, at the junction of the Zhongshan East Road and Beijing East Road. It neighbours the Banque de l'Indochine Building on Zhongshan East Road, while its main entrance is on Beijing East Road.

It currently houses the Shanghai Clearing House, but previously housed the Shanghai People's Radio Station until 1996, the United States Information Agency and United States Navy until 1949, the Yokohama Specie Bank until 1945, and the Glen Line company until 1937.

== History ==
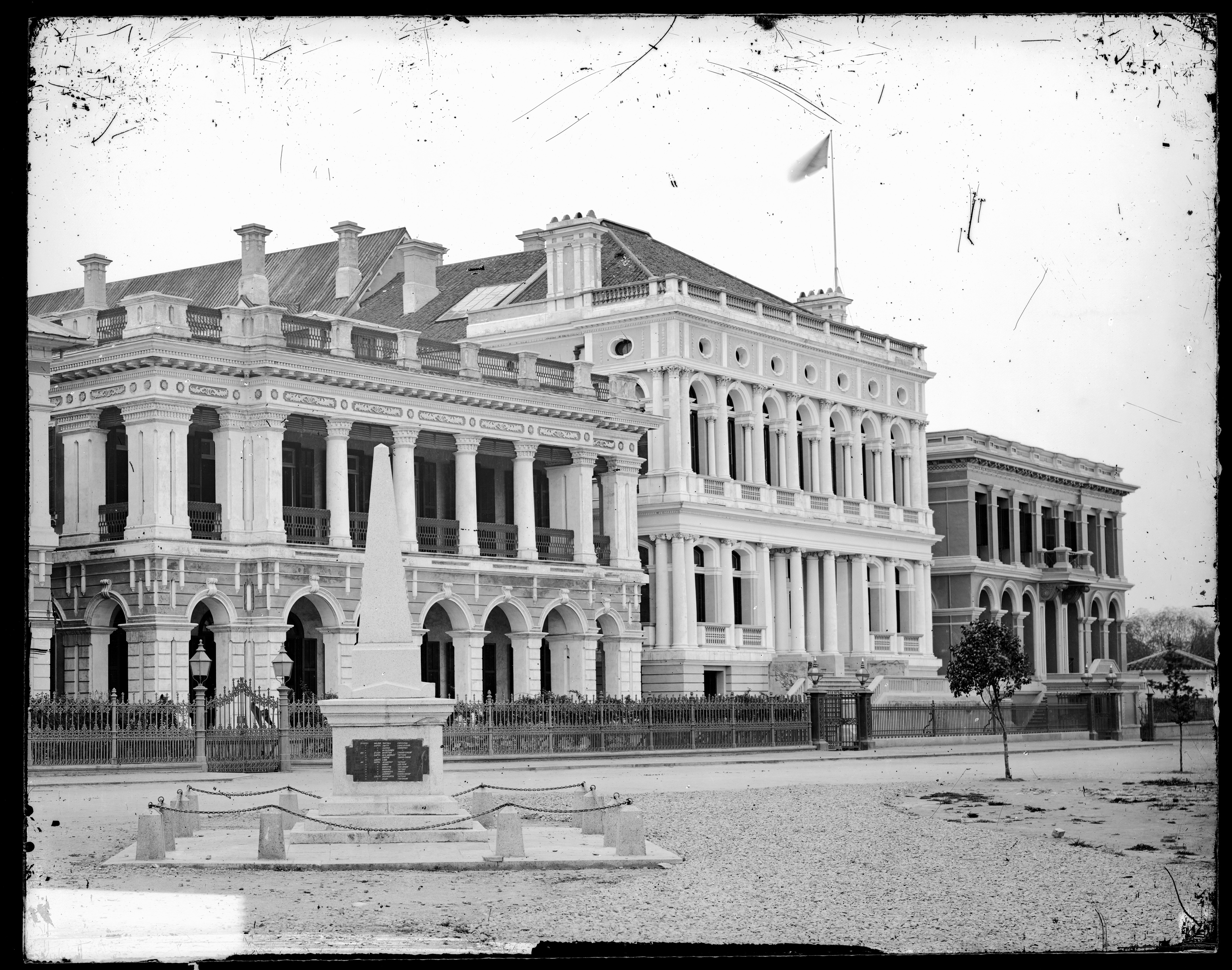
From left to right, Siemssen & Co (original No. 28 building), the former building of No. 29 (Now the Banque de l'Indochine Building), and the former No. 27 Building (now the Jardine Matheson Building). Taken in 1872

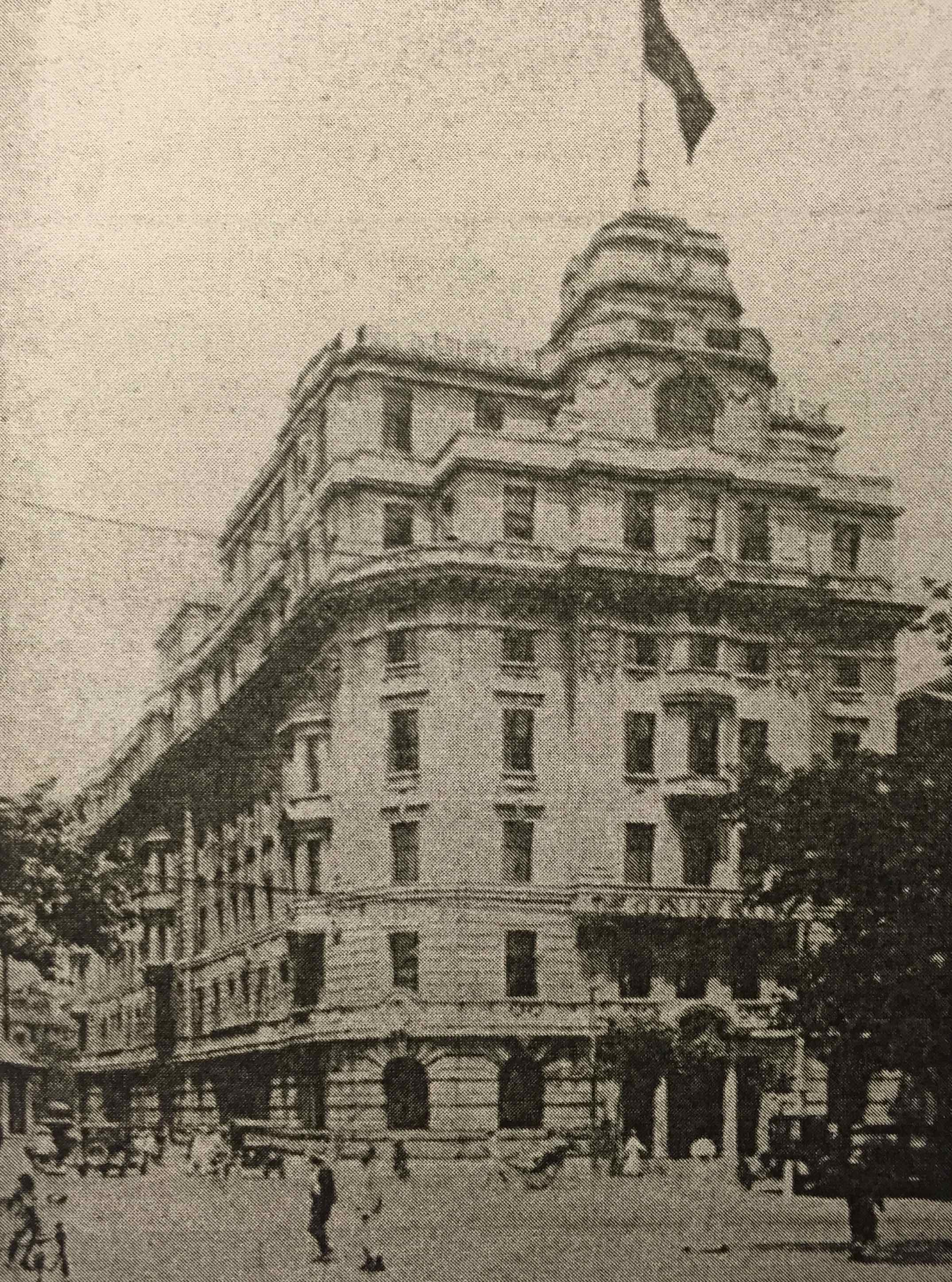
The Glen Line Building in 1939

In 1856, Siemssen & Co, a German company, bought the land of No. 28, The Bund, and constructed a two-storey veranda-style brick-timber hybrid building. They operated shipping lanes and traded firearms, machinery, steel, electrical appliances, vehicles, makeup, and much more, as well as selling insurance.

After the beginning of World War 1, the Chinese government absorbed all German businesses. Because a portion of Siemssen & Co was Dutch-owned, it was permitted to continue its business in China.

After World War 1, Siemssen & Co, as a German business, was forced to withdraw from China, and Glen Line purchased No. 28.

In 1920, Glen Line demolished the old building and began constructing a new building at No. 28. It was completed in March 1922. The bottom floor was used by Glen Line themselves, while all other floors were rented out.

After the loss in the Battle of Shanghai, the Glen Line Building was occupied by Japanese forces, and the bottom floor was used by the Yokohama Specie Bank.

Following the surrender of Japan, the building was returned to Glen Line, but because of the impact of the war, shipping routes were struggling to recover, leading Glen Line to rent the building to the United States Navy and news agencies including the Associated Press.

On 5 September 1945, the US consulate began to operate from the Glen Line building after resuming operations following the Surrender of Japan.

In April 1949, the US Navy left the building, and the Navy offices were taken over by the consulate.

In July 1949, after the success of the Shanghai Campaign, the consulate became under siege by former Chinese employees of the US Navy who demanded more severance pay.

In 1950, due to the refusal to recognise the US consulate staff's diplomatic status from the new communist government, the US consulate closed on 25 April 1950.

In March 1951, the Shanghai People's Radio Station moved into the building, and the building was renamed as the Shanghai People's Radio Station Building. The building, at the time, was renovated to be the most advanced and large-scale broadcast control centre, having 9 broadcasting offices and 16 differently-sized broadcasting studios. Equipped with stereo broadcasting equipment, it was the most advanced in the country.

The bottom floor of the Glen Line Building was transformed into a Sino-Soviet Friendship Hall in May 1951.

In 1994, the Glen Line Building was designated as an 'Outstanding Historical Building of Shanghai' by the Shanghai Municipal People's Government, under the serial code A-III-015.

In October 1996, the Shanghai People's Radio Station moved to the Shanghai Broadcasting Building.

In November 1996, the Glen Line Building was included in the fourth batch of major cultural heritage site under national-level protection by the State Council of the People's Republic of China, alongside the whole Bund complex, as 'important near-modern historical sites and representative buildings'

On 28 November 2009, the building started housing the newly established Shanghai Clearing House, and as of June 2024, it remains housing it.

== Architecture ==
The Glen Line Building has a total floor area of 11,181 m^{2} (120,350 sq ft), with a 1,751 m^{2} (18,850 sq ft) land area. It is built in a Renaissance and Neoclassical style.

The main entrance features an arched doorway with a portico, with two Palladian columns supporting a carved architrave.

The first and second floors of the building are faced with granite, with carved horizontal lines across, while the third to seventh floors are faced with quartz concrete. There is a decorated overhang between the fifth and sixth floors. The Glen Line building is designed to resonate the shape of a ship from afar.

The floor of the first floor is made of a mosaic of black and white marble, and all woodwork within the building are teak and oak. The main staircase is located in the centre of the north facade, between two lifts, and through a broad archway. There are overhanging balconies on the third and fourth floors, and the top floor has a penthouse for the manager.

One of the unique features of the interior design is indirect lighting. Electric lights are all hidden in bronze bowls hanging from the ceiling, and the reflected light creates a softer lighting in the building.
