= Great Northern Telegraph Building =

Historic building in Shanghai, China

Coordinates: 31.2371°N 121.4859°E

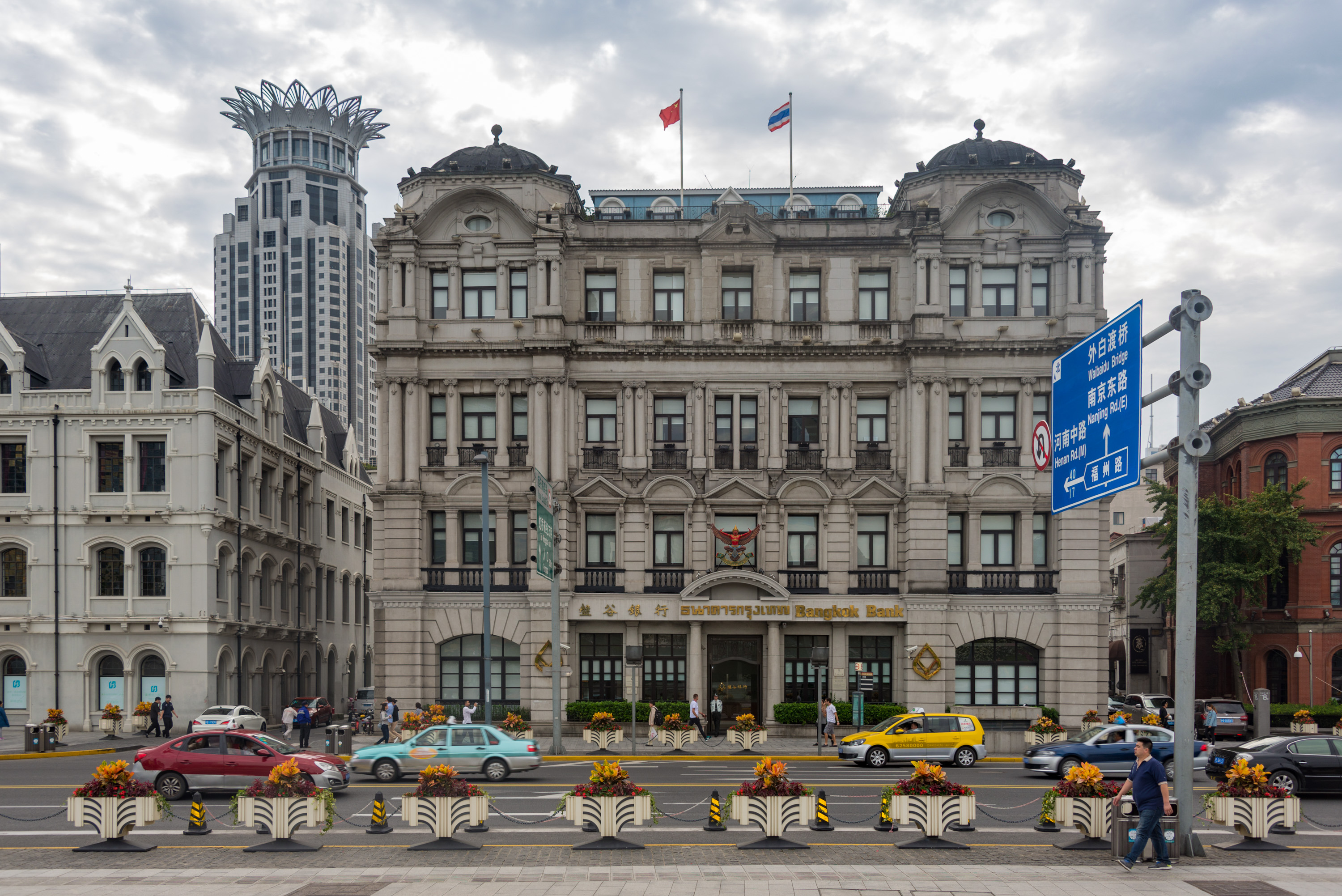
Front view

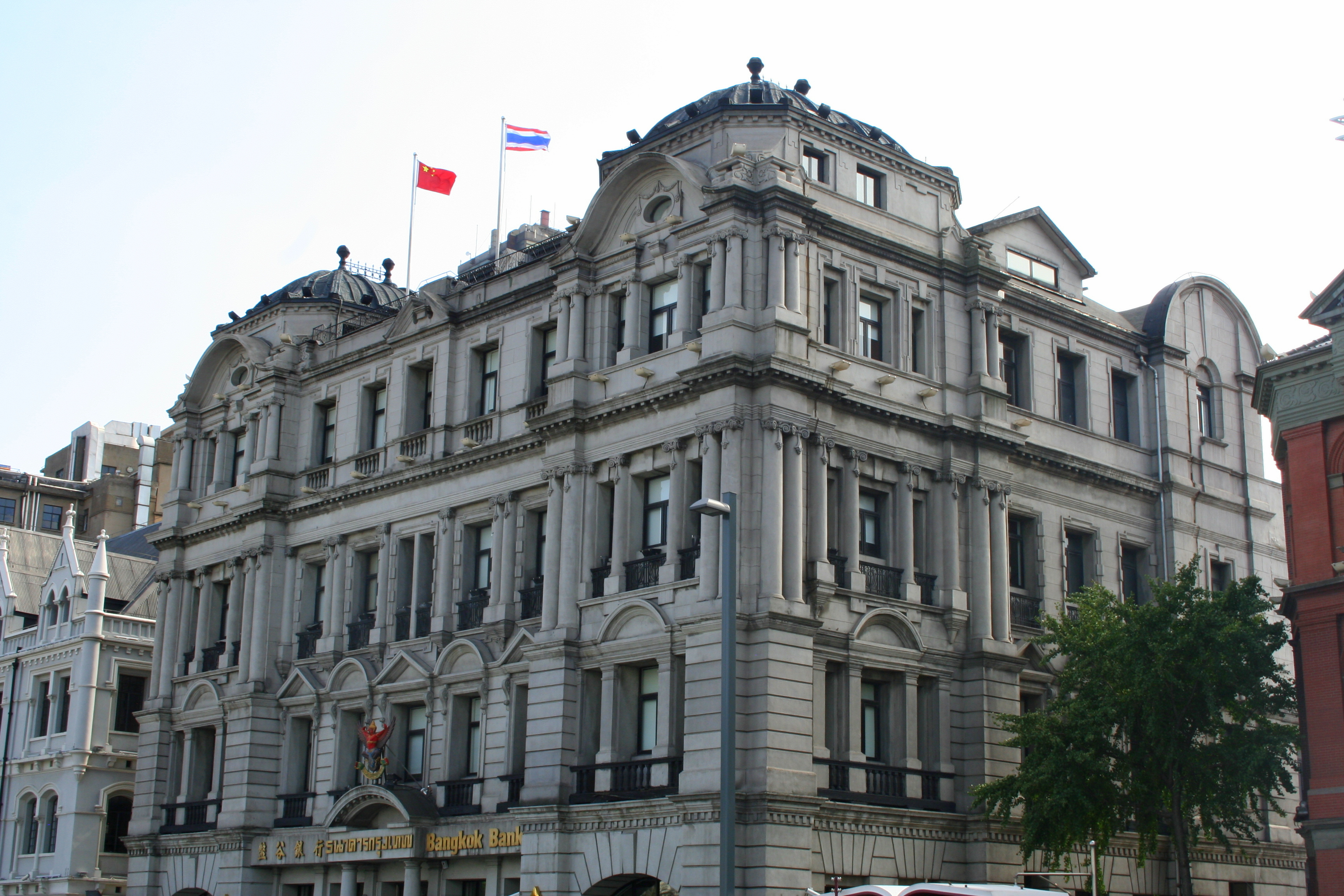
Side view

The Great Northern Telegraph Building (Chinese: 大北电报公司大楼), also known as the Telegraph Building (电报大楼), is a historical building on the Bund, Shanghai, China.

== Location and history ==
The building is situated at No. 7 on the Bund and was built by for Danish Great Northern Telegraph Company. This piece of land of size 724 square metres was originally the property of Russell & Company. On August 15 1881, the Great Northern Telegraph Company rented the original building on the site. The company set up first telephone switch in Shanghai within the building in 1882.

With original building deteriorating, the company decided to build a new one on its site, designed by the architectural firm Atkinson & Dallas. However, a large fire in October 1905 atop the offices under construction and took over two hours to extinguish. The roof collapsed and the entire third floor and attic had to be rebuilt. This delayed the completion of the building for a whole year. The building, which eventually opened in January 1908, also housed the offices of the British owned Eastern Extension and the American owned Commercial Cable telegraph companies. The building housed some state-of-the art equipment at the time of its completion, including a pneumatic tube system to handle the telegrams and a lift made by Smith & Stevens of London. There were public telephones in the ground floor hall.

Originally there were three Bund entrances leading to the respective company offices. The Great Northern Telegraph Company occupied the ground floor until 1921, when it moved to its newly completed building at 4 Avenue Edward VII (currently 34 East Yan'an Road), behind the Asia Building. In 1945, the Commercial Bank of China, which was previously next door at No. 6, moved into the building. The building was later used by the Yangtze River Shipping Company. Since 1995, the building is largely used by the Bangkok Bank Public Company Limited. The Royal Thai Consulate-General also occupied parts of the building until 2008.
