= Nissin Building =

Multi-storey urban building in Shanghai, China

Coordinates: 31.2364°N 121.4863°E

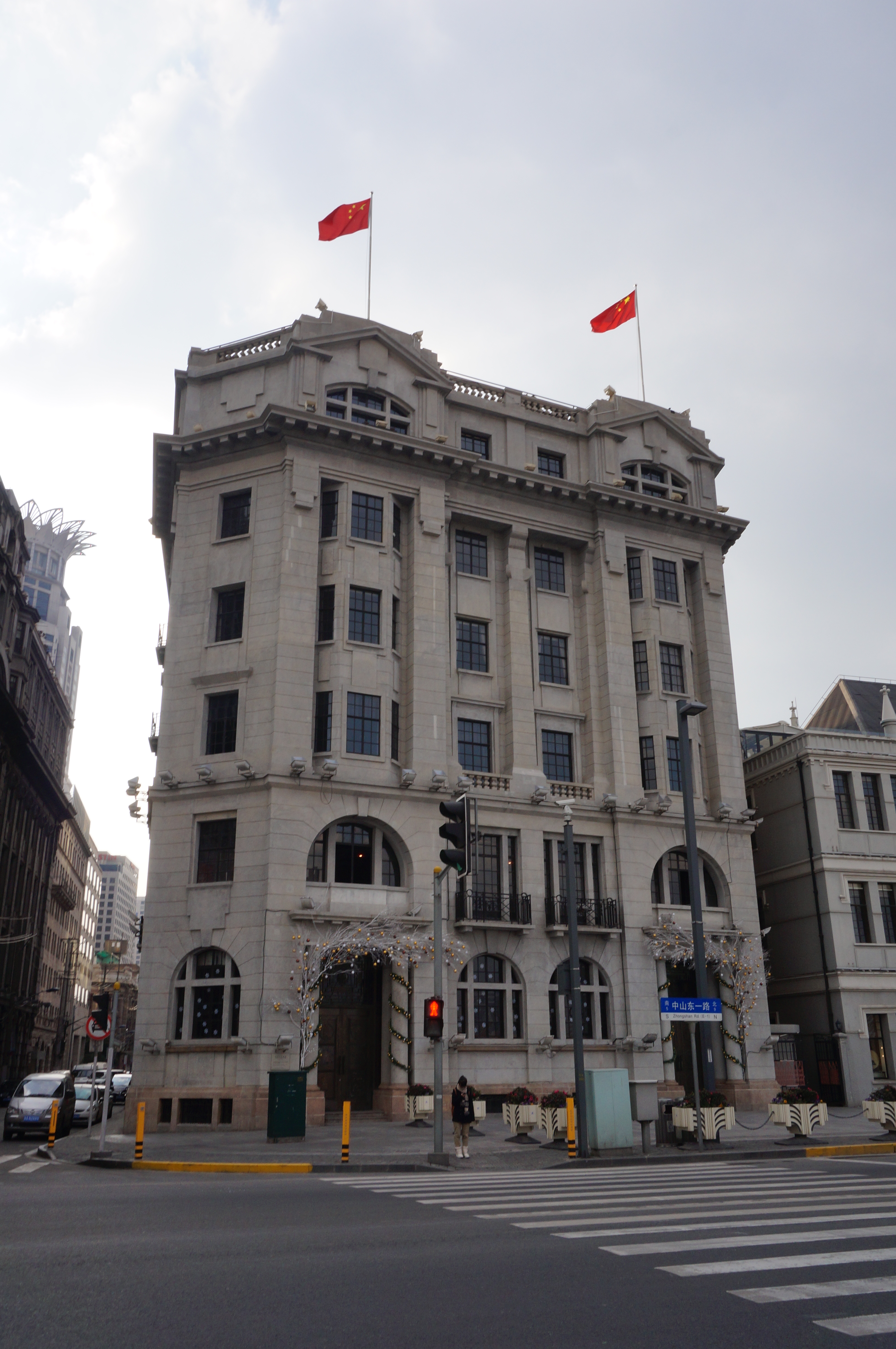
The Nissin Building

The Nissin Building (Chinese: 日清大楼) is a six-storey building on the Bund, Shanghai, China.

== Description ==
The building is located at Number 5, the Bund at the junction of the Bund and Guangdong Road). The site of the building is 1280 square metres, formerly used by a Japanese fire insurance company and had undergone numerous reselling between several British firms.

== Construction and ownership ==
The building was initially planned by the Japanese shipping company Nisshin Kisen Kaisha Shipping Co. There was a lack of funding but a Jewish merchant agreed to pay half the costs of construction, and funded the construction of three of its stories. Construction of the building started in 1921 and it was completed in 1925. The architectural firm was Lester, Johnson and Morriss. It has a floor space of 5484 square metres. One of the earliest applicants for a space in the new building was a Japanese entrepreneur who wished to open a Turkish bath and restaurant in part of the basement. After the Second World War the China Merchants Steam Navigation Company took over the building. The building became owned by Shanghai Maritime Bureau shortly after the establishment of the People's Republic of China in 1949. The bureau continued to use the building until the 1990s when it moved to an office tower Pudong and this building was leased to different firms, most notably the Bund branch of Huaxia Bank and a gate was added to the south. The building's façade consists both Japanese and Western elements and is completely covered in granite. The décor is much simpler in the lower three stories than above, which features reliefs and granite columns.
