= Jardine Matheson Building =

Historic building in Shanghai, China

Coordinates: 31.2428°N 121.4855°E

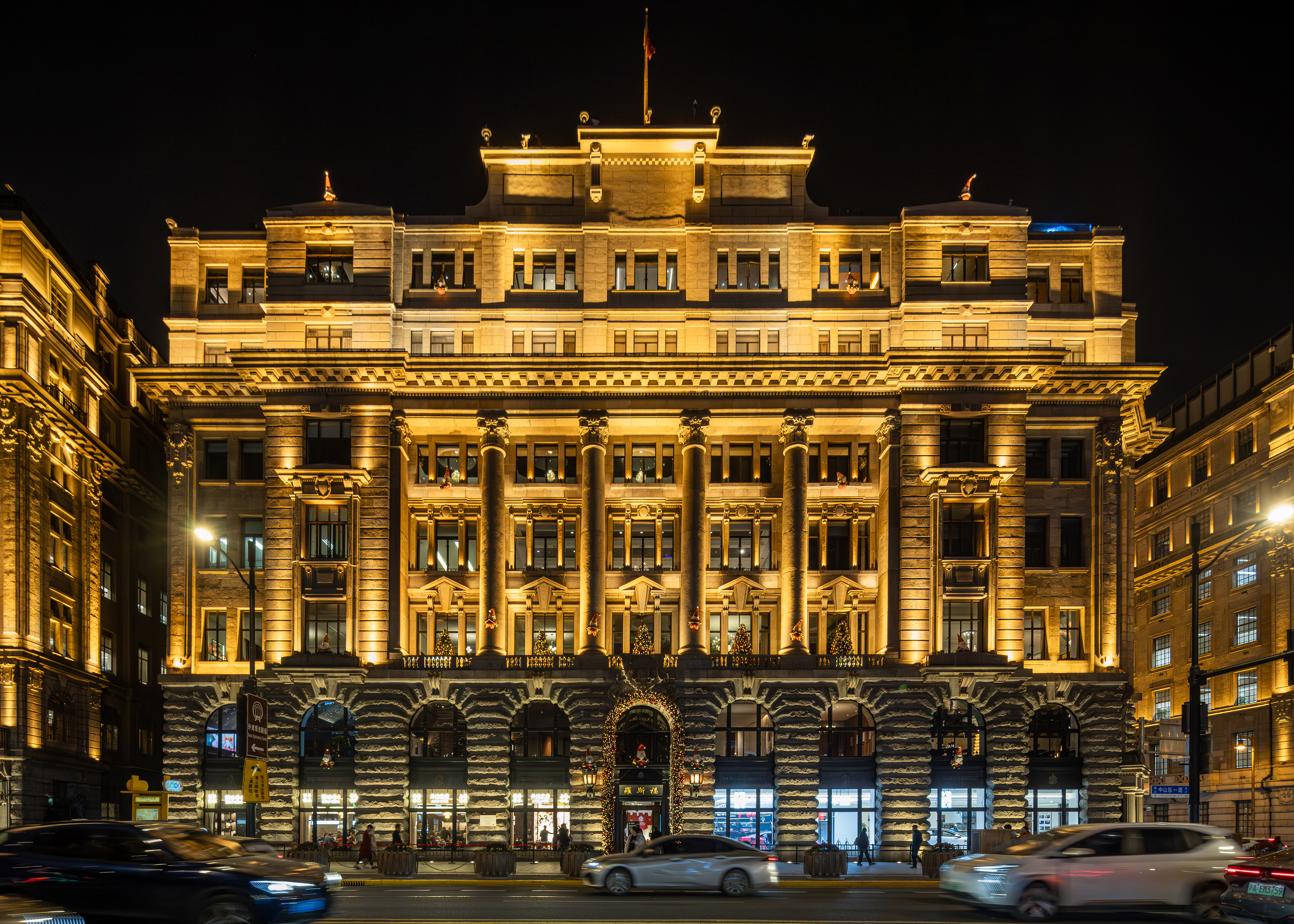
Jardine Matheson Building from the Bund at night in 2025

The Jardine Matheson Building (Chinese: 怡和洋行大楼) is a seven-storey historical building on the Bund in Shanghai, China.

== Location and history ==
The building is located at No. 27 on the Bund, at the junction with East Beijing Road (formerly Peking Road). The Hong Kong–based Scottish firm Jardine Matheson started trading in Shanghai in early 1843 and became one of the first foreign businesses to set up branches in the city. The company rented this piece of land, of size 2100 square metres and a typical two storied gardened English cottage was built on it in 1845. This cottage underwent three major renovations through its history, and was replaced by a notably larger three storey building of Masonry and Wood structure In 1865, a gatehouse and a canopy were also added.

The construction of the current building on the site was started in 1920, and was completed in November 1922. It was designed by Moorhead ＆ Halse in Beaux-Arts style and was built by contractor Yu Chang Tai. It started as a five-storey building with a floor area of 14,300 square metres. In 1930, an extra floor was added. During the Japanese occupation of Shanghai, the building was taken over by the Japanese firm Mitsui & Co. In 1946, Jardine Matheson returned to the building but its profits fell substantially and it was forced to rent the building to other firms. These occupants include the Cheong Hing Shipping Company and the British consulate, amongst others. In 1955, the building began to be used by the Shanghai Foreign Trade Administration Office. Another storey was added in 1983. This addition has been criticized to have altered the original building style.

In 2009, the largest Rolex flagship store in the world, with a floor space of 1000 square metres, opened on the first floor of the building. Prior to its opening, the building underwent a large scale interior renovation costing 80 million RMB to restore the building's original appearance.

== Gallery ==
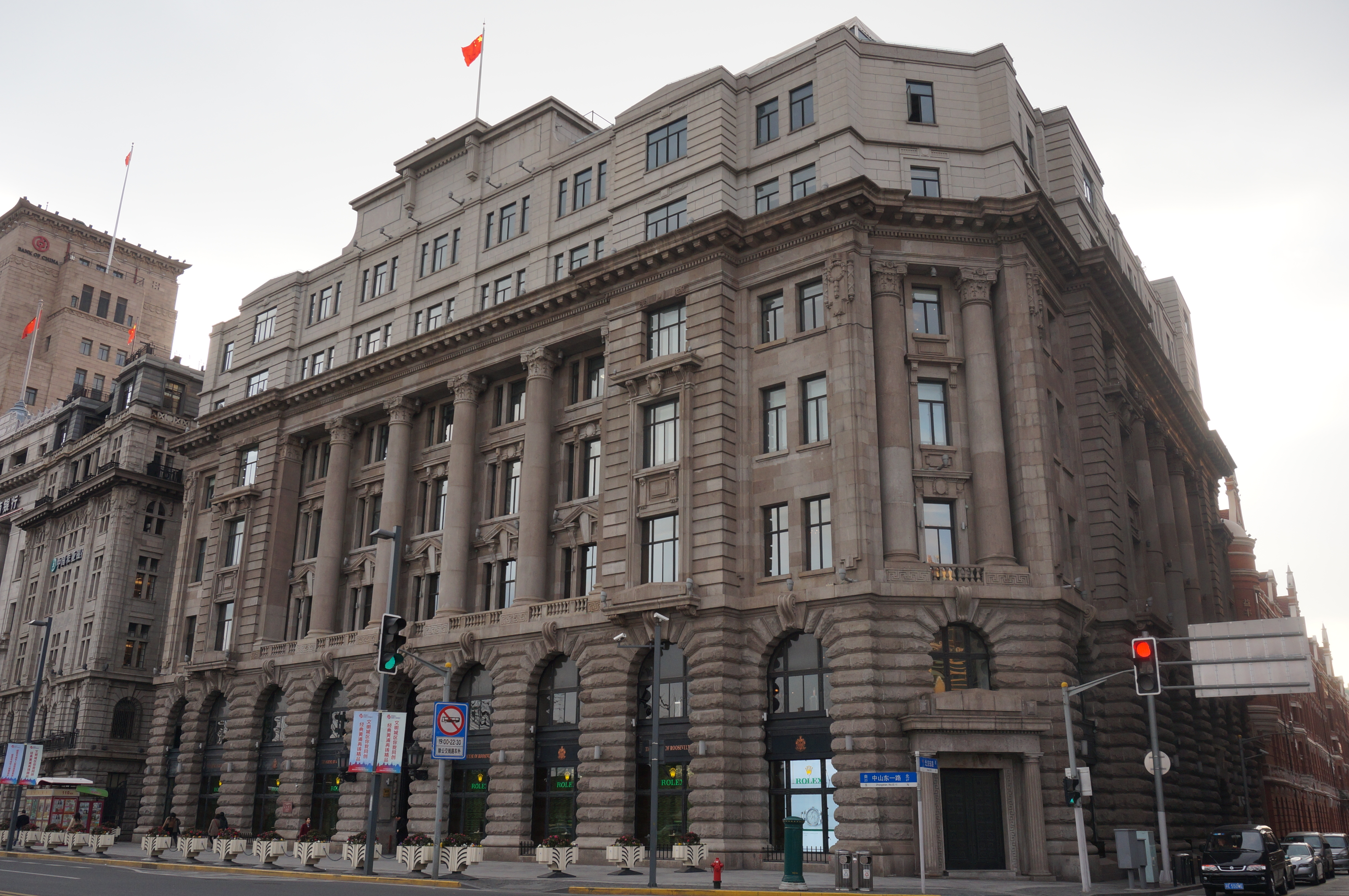
Side view of the building

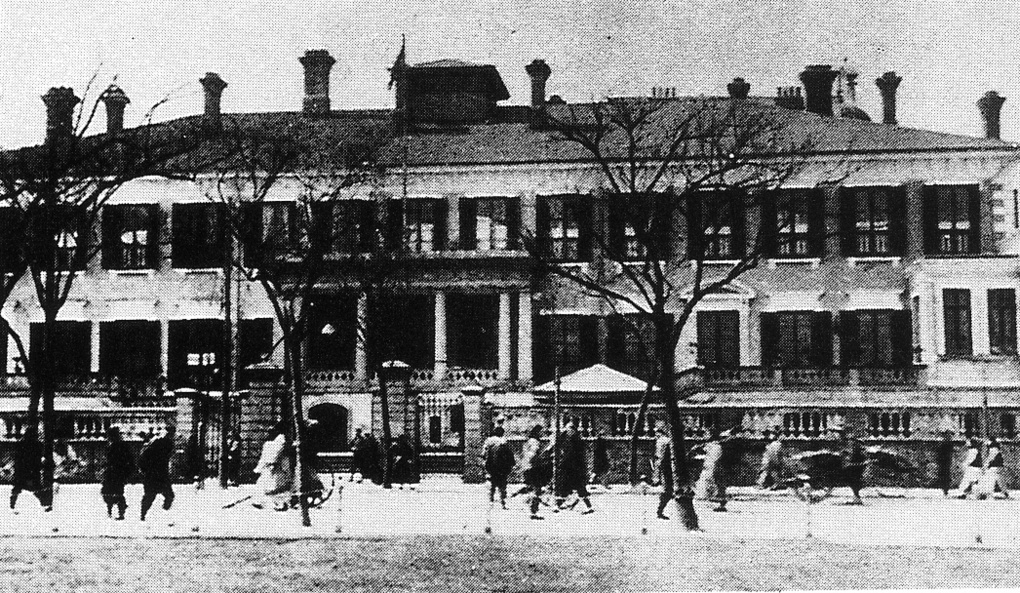
The second generation building on the site

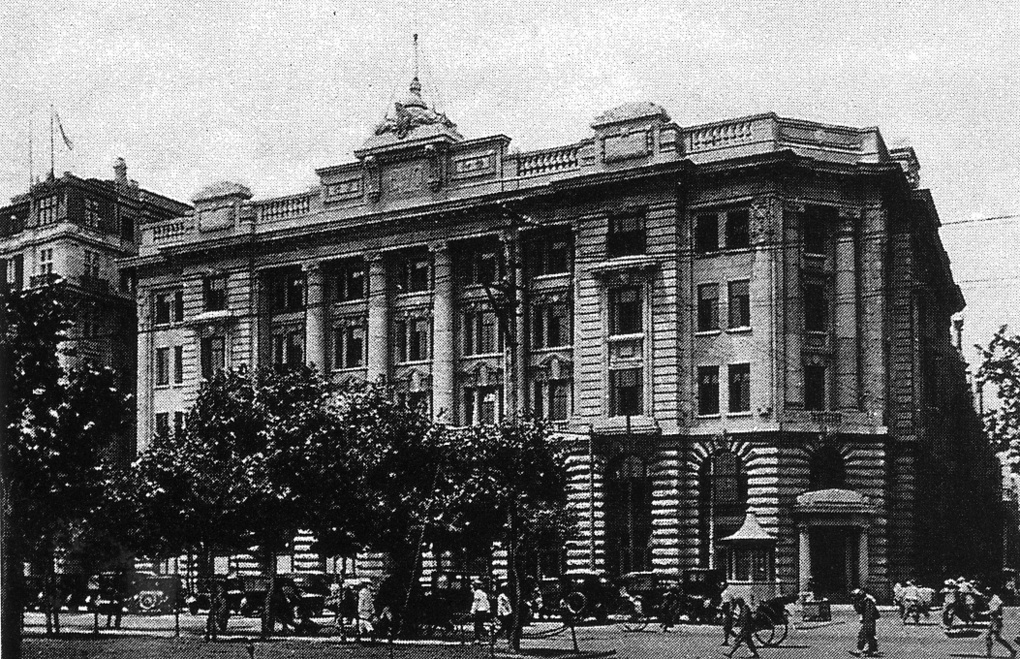
The building before the two extra stories were added atop
