= The Water House =

Hotel in Huangpu, Shanghai, China

Coordinates: 31.220°N 121.505°E

The Water House (full name: The Water House at South Bund) (Chinese: 精品酒店; pinyin: Jīngpǐn Jiǔdiàn) is a hotel housed in an old Japanese-style building of the 1930s built on the banks of the Huangpu River in the Huangpu District of Shanghai, China. Formerly the headquarters of the Japanese army during World War II, it was later used as a warehouse. The Water House at South Bund was the first top fashion design hotel in Shanghai.

== Design Concept ==
The overall design goals for the 19-bedroom were to fully blend inside and outside space, and focus on public areas and private space coordination.

== Architectural features ==
The appearance of the Water House deliberately retains the original appearance of the building and the internal courtyard created a new and original style of window.

== Furniture ==
The Water House has a large collection of classic furniture from well-known designers. These include Finn Juhl, "Danish Modern" style designer Arne Jacobsen, Danish furniture designer Hans Wegner, Milan designer Antonio Citterio, and Kana Ishikawa, the Japanese designer who designed the noted Yohji Yamamoto boutique.
