= Yokohama Specie Bank Building =

Building in Shanghai, China

Coordinates: 31.2408°N 121.4847°E

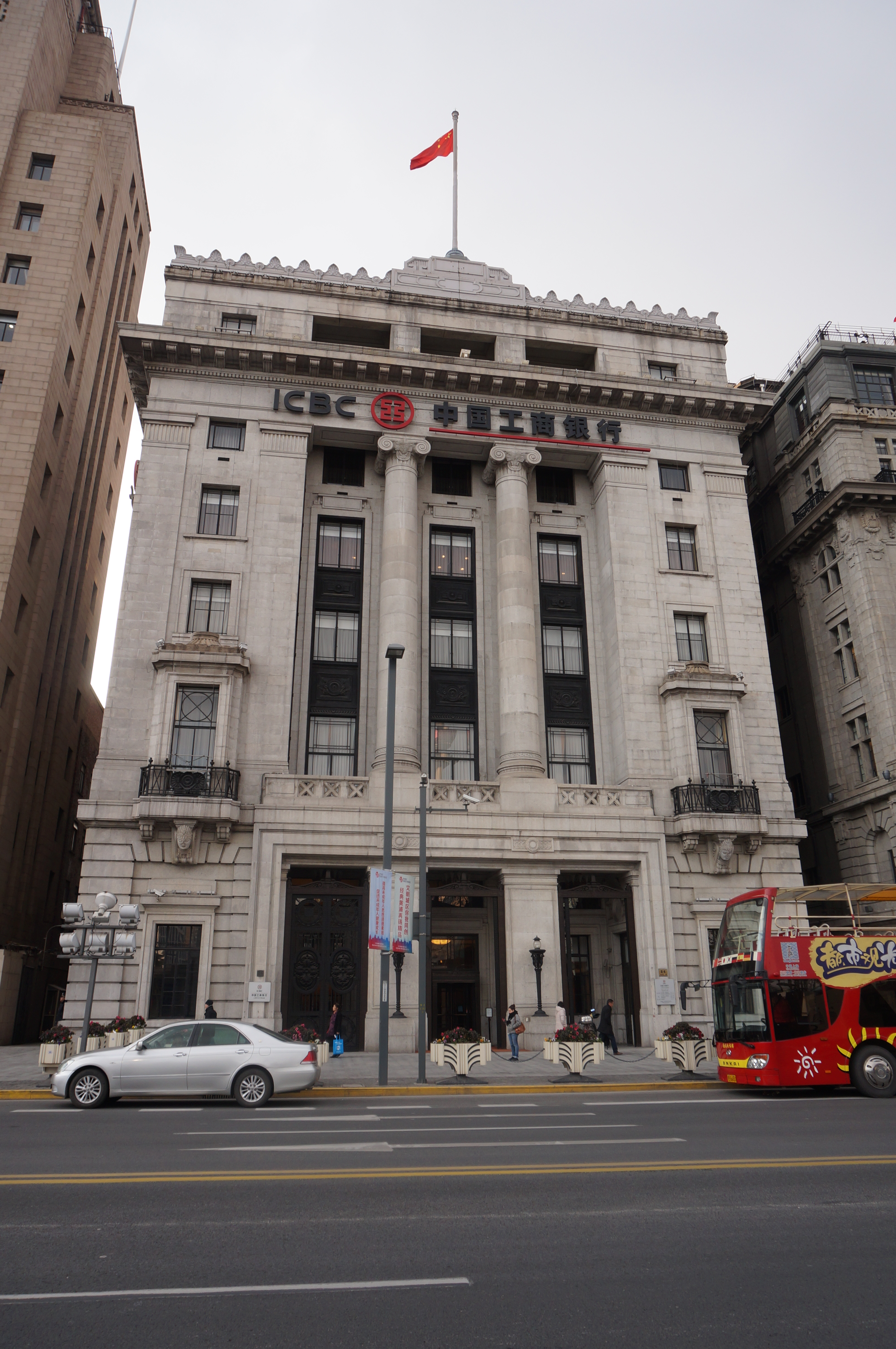
The old Yokohama Specie Bank Building was completed in 1924.

The Yokohama Specie Bank Building is a seven-story building in The Bund, Shanghai, China; previously it was a branch of Yokohama Specie Bank. It is now a regional branch of the Industrial and Commercial Bank of China (ICBC).

The building was designed by architects at P & T Architects & Engineers Ltd. The building was built on the site of David Sassoon's 1845 building. The Japanese bank purchased the site in 1920, began construction of the current building in 1923, and completed construction in 1924. After World War II the Chinese government confiscated the bank's assets, and the building was transferred to the regional branch of the Central Bank of the Republic of China. In 1949, the Eastern China branch of the People's Bank of China was opened in the building. In 1956, the Shanghai Textile Industry Bureau moved to the building, and moved out later in 1990s.

== Bibliography ==
- Shea, Marilyn. "The Bund - Picture Guide to Historic Buildings". The University of Maine. 2007. Retrieved September 22, 2012.
