= Campbell MacKenzie-Richards =

English aviator, Royal Air Force test pilot, and air race contestant

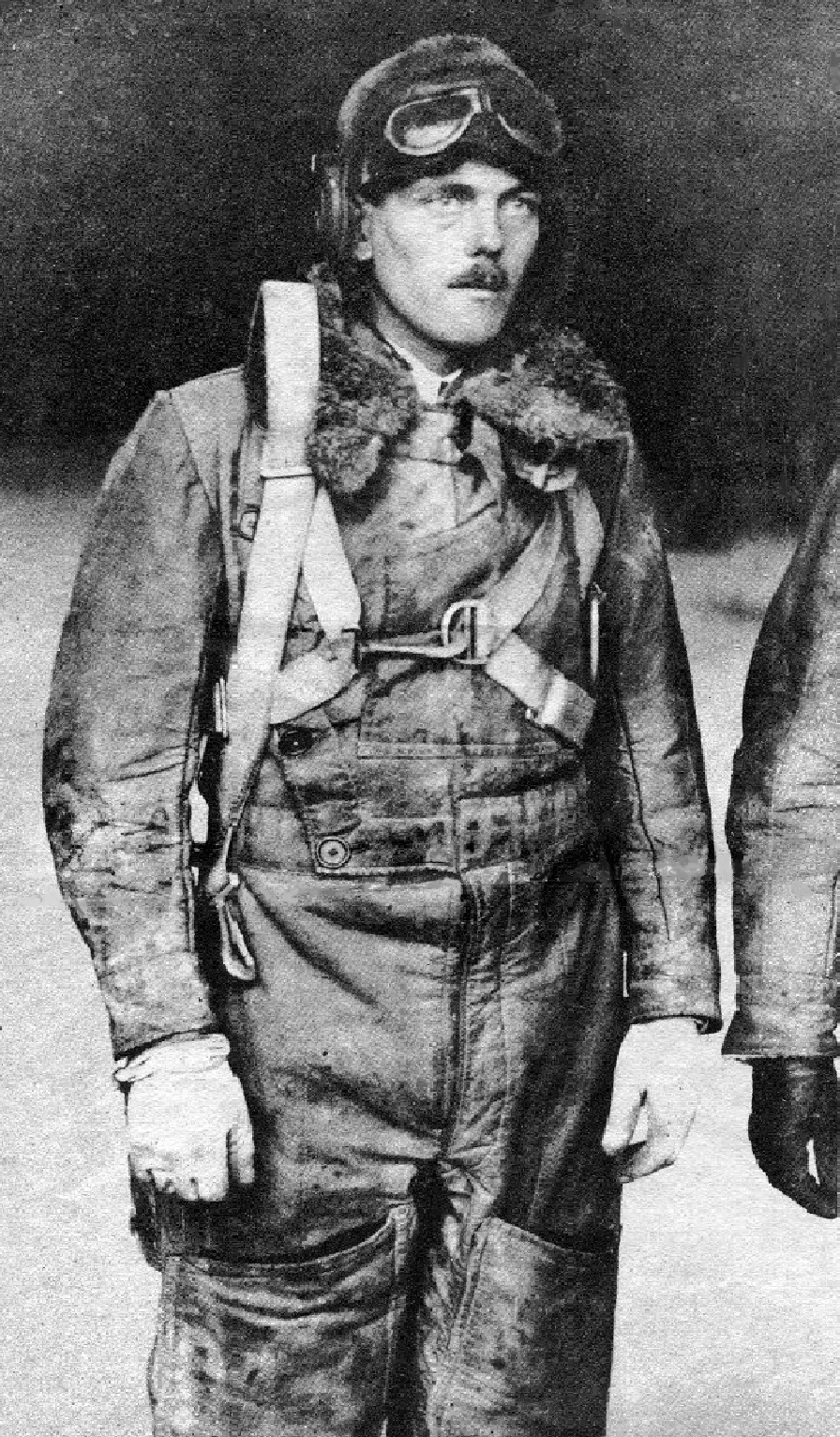
Campbell MacKenzie-Richards, (1900–1927)

Campbell Mackenzie-Richards (6 January 1900 – 9 November 1927) was a pioneer English aviator, Royal Air Force test pilot, and air race contestant, who was killed testing experimental equipment in November 1927.

== Early life ==
Campbell MacKenzie-Richards was born on 6 January 1900 in Streatham, London, the grandson of Peter Felix Richards (born 1808 in Edinburgh, Scotland; died 14 November 1868 in Shanghai, China), the founder of the Astor House, Shanghai; and the son of Peter Felix Mackenzie-Richards (born about 1863 in Shanghai; died 18 December 1920 in Colchester, Essex), a civil engineer, and Mary Edith "Mollie" MacRae (born 1 July 1869 in Brighton, Sussex; died 7 December 1954 at Heigham Hall, a private mental hospital in Norwich, Norfolk), who had married on 4 September 1893 at St. Leonard's Church, Upper Deal, Kent. MacKenzie-Richards was baptised on 1 March 1900 at the Holy Trinity Church at Upper Tooting. MacKenzie-Richards was the brother of Kenneth (born 1894 in Kensington; died 26 December 1980); Ursula (born 13 November 1902; died 11 December 1995); and Mary (born 1907 in Woodbridge, Suffolk; died 1983). Campbell MacKenzie-Richards was educated at the Woodbridge School in Suffolk.

== Career ==
During World War I MacKenzie-Richards served in the British Merchant Navy and was decorated twice.

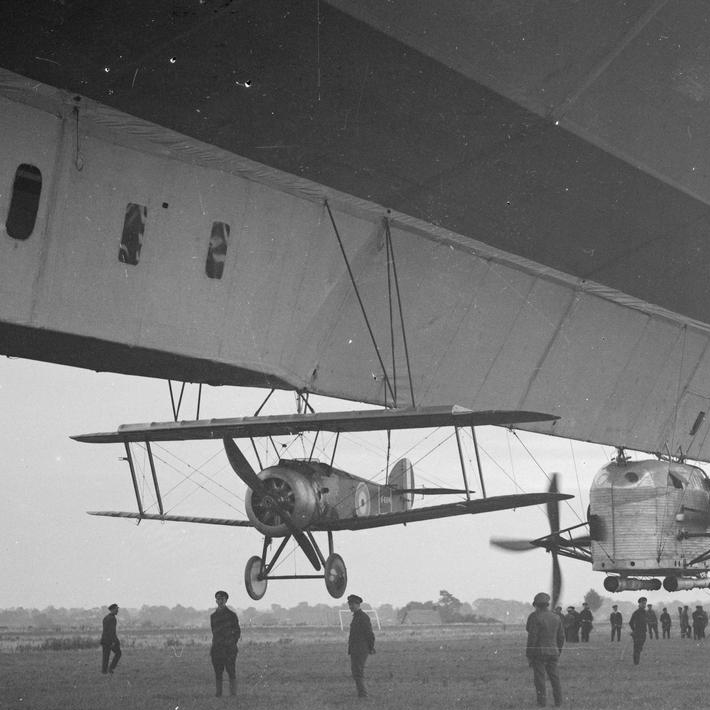
Sopwith Camel under the 23r airship, 1918

Around 1923 MacKenzie-Richards joined the Royal Air Force. On 24 January 1924 he was confirmed as Pilot Officer and later was promoted to the rank of Flying Officer, and was attached to the Bombing Squadron based at Martlesham Heath. After earning the reputation of being a highly skilled pilot, MacKenzie-Richards was attached to the experimental staff of the Royal Aircraft Establishment at Farnborough.

As part of the Airship Development Programme, from 9 October 1925 a hook-equipped de Havilland Humming Bird (Registration G-EBQP) was used in a short series of experiments with "an obsolete underpowered type of airship", HMA R33 (known colloquially as the "Pulham Pig") in an attempt to develop an airborne aircraft carrier. On 15 October 1925 the Humming Bird flown by Squadron Leader Rollo Haig, was released from the R33, and became the first to reattach an aircraft to a rigid airship, although the propeller was damaged as he reattached and he detached again to glide to a separate landing at the aerodrome. On 4 December 1925 Flight Lieutenant Janor, flying a Humming Bird was the first to successfully hook an aeroplane onto a rigid airship and remain attached until the airship landed. Previously the Royal Air Force had modified two F.1 Sopwith Camels (serials N6622 and N6814) for trials by No. 212 Squadron RAF with airship HMA 23r, which culminated in Lt. R.E. Keys piloting one on 6 November 1918, and the first launch and recovery of an aircraft in mid-air had been performed by the US Army TC-3 blimp on 15 December 1924, with a Sperry Messenger biplane performing a sortie from and back to a "skyhook" attached to the blimp.

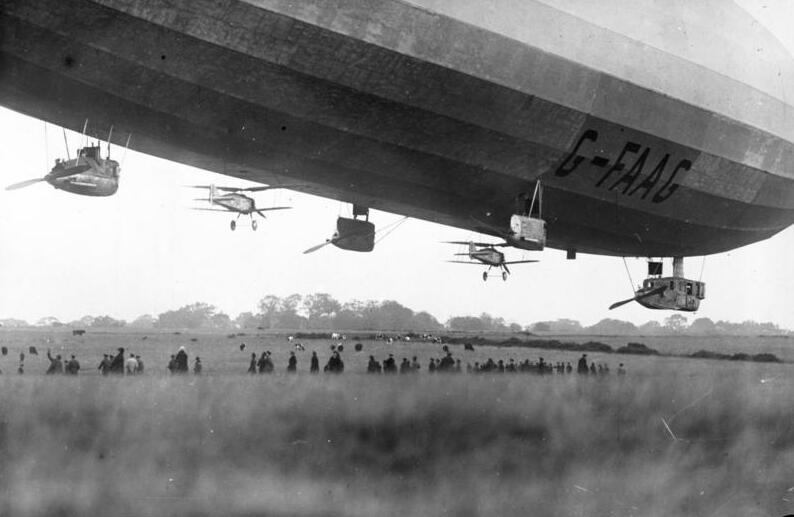
The pair of Gloster Grebes under the R33 airship, 1926

On Thursday 21 October 1926, MacKenzie-Richards and Flying Officer (later Air Vice-Marshal) R.L. Ragg participated in the experimental trials of launching twin parasite aircraft from retractable trapezes attached under the keel of the R33 using two Gloster Grebe fighters (J.7400 and J.7385) from Pulham aerodrome. The first Grebe, flown by MacKenzie-Richards, which was positioned aft, was released at 10.17am over Pulham at an altitude of 2,500 feet (762 metres), and, after diving for about 100 ft (30 metres), it levelled out. The Times reported the next day: "The aeroplane, with her engine running, dropped like a stone and then regaining control, MacKenzie-Richards performed a series of stunts, looping-the-loop, rolling and flying upside down", while Flight indicated that the plane "gambolled gaily in the air as if glad to be free, at last, from the maternal apron strings," before landing safely back at Pulham. After some difficulty in starting the engine, the second Grebe piloted by Ragg, which had been positioned abaft of the first Grebe, was successfully released at 11.30am from a slightly higher altitude over Cardington, Bedfordshire, and made a safe landing at Cardington.

In another experiment, the Grebes piloted by MacKenzie-Richards and Ragg were released from 2,000 feet and were able to fly and then reattach their planes to a skyhook on the airship. Despite the successful trials, the technique was never adopted.

== Air racing ==
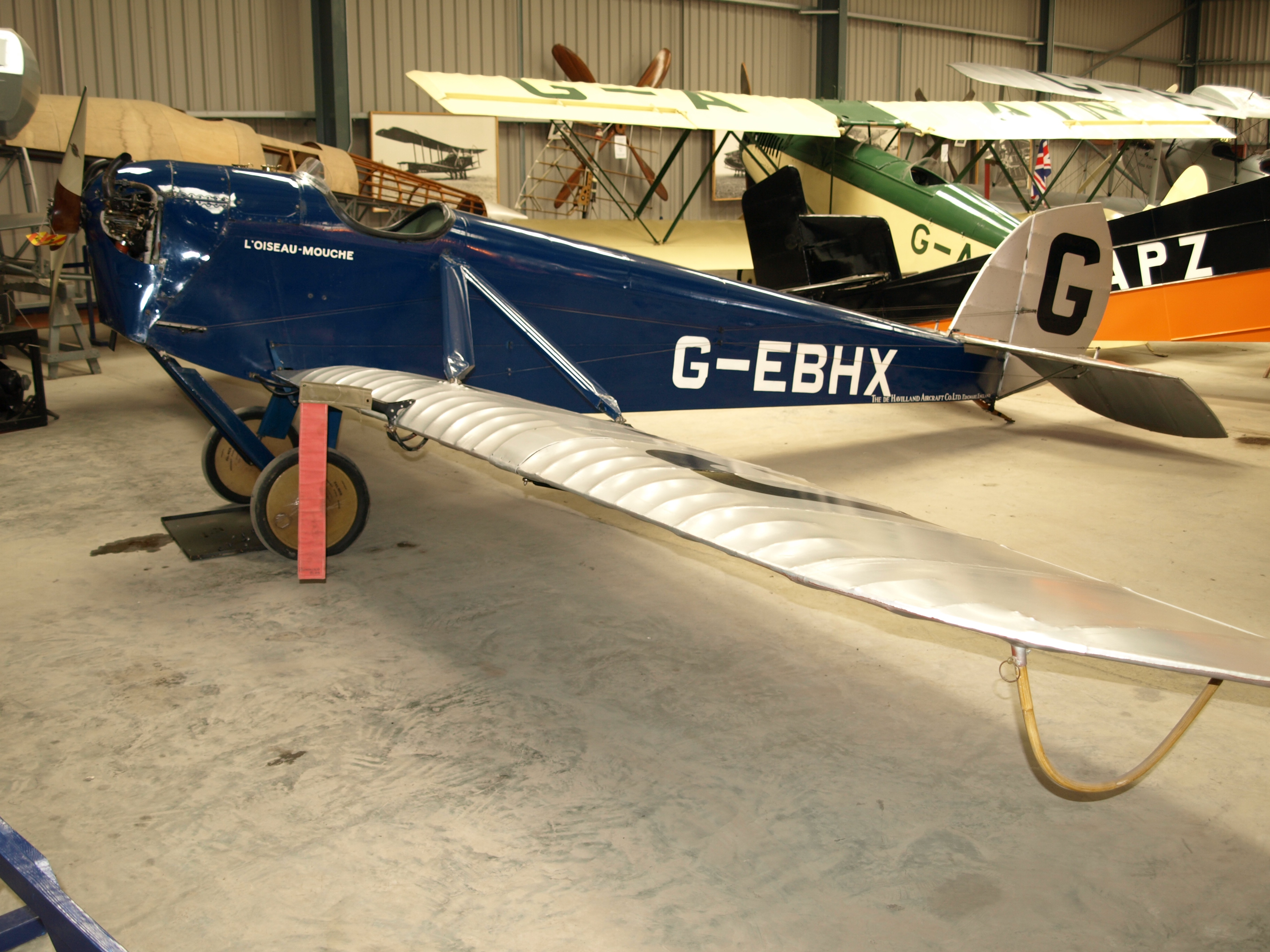
de Havilland D.53 Humming Bird at the Shuttleworth Collection, Bedfordshire

MacKenzie-Richards was a member of the Royal Aircraft Establishment (R.A.E.) Aero Club, and competed in air races. In June 1927 MacKenzie-Richards took part in the Whitsun weekend air races (4 and 6 June 1927) at the Ensbury Park racecourse (near Bournemouth), winning from scratch convincingly the delayed first race of the meet on Saturday, 4 June 1927, the Low Power Handicap for aeroplanes with engines less than 1500cc, against three other competitors (two others had withdrawn) in de Havilland Humming Bird G-EBQP, a single-seat ultralight monoplane that had been used in the R33 trials, with a Bristol Cherub III engine. at 73.5 miles per hour. The crash of a de Havilland DH.37A earlier on 4 June 1927, and the collision of a Westland Widgeon and a Blackburn Bluebird on Whit Monday, 6 June 1927, which resulted in the death of two pilots and a passenger in front of thousands of spectators forced the cessation of further air races at Ensbury Park racecourse, and its eventual sale to a housing developer.

During the Nottingham Flying Meeting held at the Hucknall Torkard aerodrome at Hucknall, Nottinghamshire on the Summer Bank Holiday weekend, which included the 6th King's Cup Race, after starting from the scratch position, Mackenzie-Richards came third flying the same Humming Bird in "ideal flying conditions" over the 8.5-mile single-lap course in the Papplewick Stakes Low-power Handicap, the first event held at 11.30am on Monday, 1 August 1927, and received £10.

== Marriage ==
On Wednesday 17 August 1927, MacKenzie-Richards married Mirabel Cobbold (born 2 May 1904), who had earned a Bachelor of Arts from the University of Oxford in 1926, the only child of Lt. Col. Ernest Cazenove Cobbold CB (born 15 January 1866 at Ufford, Suffolk; died 1932), of the York and Lancaster Regiment, and Edith Mary White (died 1949), at the St Peter and St Paul's Parish Church at Aldeburgh, Suffolk.

== Death and inquest ==
MacKenzie-Richards was killed in a night flying accident at East Grinstead, Surrey on 9 November 1927. MacKenzie-Richards was engaged in testing night navigating devices at Croydon aerodrome, including two new illuminated wind vanes erected there experimentally.

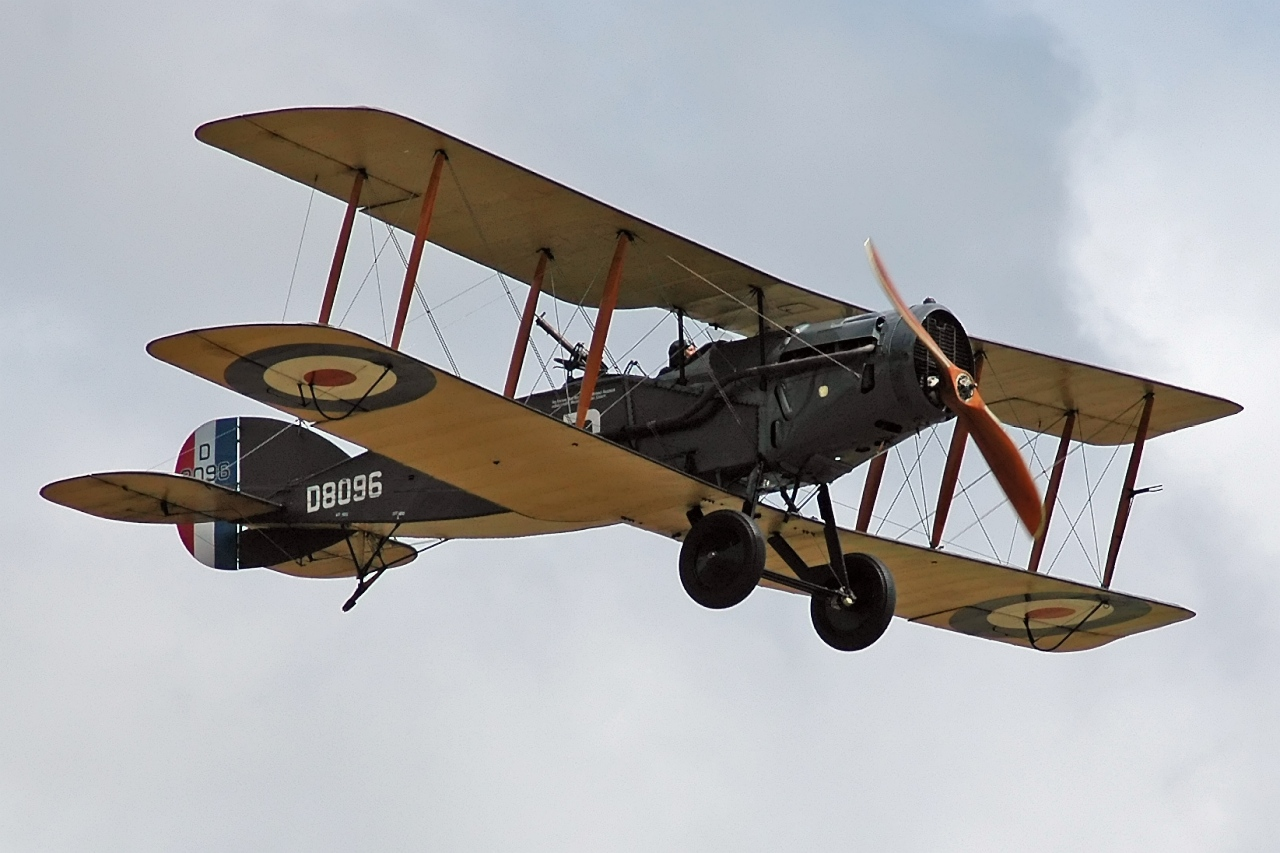
Bristol F.2 Fighter

On Wednesday, 9 November 1927, flying Bristol fighter C810, MacKenzie-Richards had finished his work at 5.30pm and left Croydon with Professor Harry Norman Green. Green (born 21 September 1902 in Sheffield, England; died 16 May 1967) was educated at the Central Secondary School in Sheffield, and received his undergraduate and medical degrees from Sheffield University, specialising in pathology. He taught at the Sheffield University (1926–1933, 1935–1953), Cambridge University (1933–1935), and the University of Leeds (1953–1967). Green's research interests focused on the immune system in cancer induction and growth. In 1947 Green was appointed Director of Cancer. a pathologist and member of the faculty of medicine (and later the Department of Pharmacology) at the University of Sheffield, as his observer. They attempted to make their way back to Farnborough, but the compass was 30 degrees out when they left. Failing to find Farnborough they attempted to return to Croydon. They flew back without seeing anything they recognised until they estimated they were over Croydon. They could not pick up any indication of Croydon nor could they see any lights. They spoke on the 'telephone' and MacKenzie-Richards suggested that they had better make a forced landing before they ran out of petrol – they only had about 20 minutes fuel remaining. He came down low and asked Green to look for a field. Presently he said that he could not see a field that he could land in and he lit a flare. There was a certain amount of mist, but nothing exceptional. They just missed some trees and climbed back up to 2,000 feet. As Green had never used a parachute before, MacKenzie-Richards briefed him particularly about not pulling the ripcord until he was clear of the aircraft. Green questioned whether the aircraft could be rolled onto its back so that they could both get out, but MacKenzie-Richards refused, saying that Green should go. At the inquest Green explained how he had one foot on the seat and one on the side waiting for the signal to jump. MacKenzie-Richards throttled the engine down and turned around, put his hand out and pushed Green. Green landed in a field and was perfectly alright. MacKenzie-Richards was found in another field, but there was no sign of life; his parachute was open. The Coroner's conclusion was that by the time MacKenzie-Richards left the aircraft he was too close to the ground and that his parachute failed to fully deploy.

At the inquest a Major Cooper informed the Court that the compasses were checked periodically on the ground, and that he was satisfied that this compass had been tested at certain periods. He pointed out that this had been an experimental aircraft, which had certain experimental lights, and the evidence suggested that one of the pieces of wiring had an effect on the compass after the machine had left the ground. It was quite possible that the error in the compass only occurred when the current was generated.

The wreckage of the aircraft was found in a wood about two hundred yards from where his body was found.

He is buried at the parish church of St. Andrew, Great Yeldham.

== Legacy ==
MacKenzie-Richards was promoted posthumously to Flight Lieutenant in the Royal Air Force. After his death, his only child, Gillian Campbell MacKenzie-Richards, was born in Aldeburgh, in 1928. For three years, Mirabel and Gillian lived in Aldeburgh. On 1 July 1931, Mirabel married Canadian farmer, Charles Robert Orr-Simpson, of British Columbia. On 14 July 1931 Mirabel and Gillian migrated to Canada on the Empress of Britain. On 26 February 1934, the Simpson family arrived in Southampton on Warwick Castle from Cape Town via Madeira, intending to live in Bath, Somerset. By June 1935, Mirabel was living in Clacton-on-Sea, Essex.
