= DeWitt Clinton Jansen =

American-Chinese judge and hotel proprietor

DeWitt Clinton Jansen (born at Shawangunk, New York on 8 November 1840; died 6 November 1894 at Shanghai), was a member of the Shanghai Municipal Council from 1893 until his death in November 1894; an Associate judge of the United States Consular Court in Shanghai; the proprietor of the Astor House Hotel in Shanghai, the first western hotel in China, from 1874 to his death in 1894; and was the first District Deputy Grand Master of the Cosmopolitan Lodge (No. 428, S. C.) of Freemasons which began working in Shanghai in 1864. Jansen Road (now Fulu Street) in Yangzepu (renamed Yangpu in 1949) was named in his honour.

== Family background ==
DeWitt Clinton Jansen was of Dutch ancestry, and was born at Shawangunk, New York on 8 November 1840, the second son of John Richard Jansen (born 2 March 1804 Wallkill, New York; died 11 March 1845 at Shawganguk) and Rachel Terwilliger (married May 1830), and the brother of Mary, Richard, William, and Cornelius. Jansen was the a great-great grandson of Thomas Jansen (1708–1798), who was one of the first settlers in the Wallkill valley, who built the Thomas Jansen House, a Dutch stone house on Jansen Road in Shawangunk. D.C. Jansen is a descendant of Mathijs Jansen van Ceulen, original owner of the piece of ground on Isle van Pappermemmins (Isle of Man Hats, aka Manhattan Island) (Original Patens, Aug 11, 1646) currently home to Columbia University. His ancestors were among the first to settle Kingston, New York in 1652.

After the death of his father in 1845, Jansen and his older brother William (born ca. 1836) lived with his grandparents, Thomas Johnson (Jansen) (born 27 Apr 1777 in Shawangunk, New York), and Leah Bleynman Johnson (Jansen). On 8 November 1871 Jansen married Ellen McGrath (died 12 November 1918 in Shanghai) in a ceremony performed by Rev. William Henry Collins, a missionary of the Church Missionary Society, at the Church of Our Saviour, Hongkew, China, one of the first churches in Shanghai. Jansen and Ellen had seven children: Ellen Rachel (born 19 May 1873 in Shanghai; died 15 March 1955 in Alameda, California); Edith Mary (born 29 March 1874); Mabel (born 10 May 1875); John DeWitt (born 22 July 1876; died 1918); Grace; Edward Clinton (born 28 November 1878); and Catharine (born 5 November 1880).

== Career highlights ==
Jansen left the United States on 7 August 1857, while still aged 16. Jansen was a merchant sailor, and colporteur in China's interior. From 1871 Jansen was resident in Shanghai, and was employed by the Imperial Maritime Customs.

=== Astor House Hotel (1874-1894) ===
By 1874 Jansen purchased the Astor House Hotel.

== Social activities ==
Jansen was a polyglot, fluent in a number of Chinese dialects, and assisted in the preparation of an 1871 Pekinese-English dictionary.

=== Church ===
Jansen was a regular attender and member of the Church Committee of the Union Church, which had been located on the London Missionary Society compound on Shantung Road since 1864, and in a new church building erected in 1886 at a new site on the corner of Soochow (Suzhou) and Yuen-ming-yuen (Yuan Ming Yuan) Roads.

=== Freemasonry ===
Jansen was a founding member of the first American Freemason lodge in China, the Cosmopolitan Lodge (No. 428, S. C.), which began working in Shanghai in 1864. From 27 December 1891, he was the first District Deputy Grand Master. of that lodge, a position he held until his death in November 1894.

=== Natural history ===
Jansen had an interest in natural history. In 1870 he sent specimens from China to the American Museum of Natural History. Jansen also served as Honorary Curator of the Shanghai Museum, from about 1880.

Jansen was a member of the China Branch of the Royal Asiatic Society of Great Britain and Ireland from 1877 until his death in 1894.

=== Shanghai Municipal Council ===
According to his obituary, Jansen was "a painstaking and prominent member of the Municipal Council."

=== United States Consular Court ===
By October 1894 Jansen was an Associate judge on the United States Consular Court in Shanghai.

== Death ==
On 6 November 1894, during an installation meeting of the lodge, Jansen "suddenly fell back in his chair, gave one or two gasps for breath" and died. On 8 November 1894 Jansen was buried in the New Cemetery of Shanghai. J.I. Miller eulogised Jansen:

speaking of Bro. Jansen as a 'typical Freemason, a just and upright man,' saying that, "His labours for the good of the Settlement and its public institutions are so well and widely known, that I will not dwell here upon them. Whatever he did, he did well."

On Sunday 11 November 1894 a memorial service was held at the Union Church, with the funeral sermon, based on Revelation 3:12, preached by Rev. John Stevens.
