= Peter Felix Richards =

Scottish merchant (1808-1868)

Peter Felix Richards (1808–1868) was a pioneering Scottish merchant in Shanghai in the era following the Treaty of Nanjing. He founded the Richards Hotel and Restaurant, the first foreign hotel in China, and the forerunner to the Astor House Hotel.

== Early life and family ==
Peter Felix Richards was born on 6 April 1808 in Edinburgh. By 1848 Richards had married Rebecca MacKenzie (born 6 May 1826 in Brechin, Forfarshire), the daughter of David and Rebecca W. MacKenzie, and the sister of Margaret (born about 1823), Christian (born about 1829), James (born about 1830), Charles (born about 1832), David (born about 1834), and Robert (born about 1836). By 1848 Richards and his wife had their first child, Rebecca A. Richards (born about 1848 in Shanghai). Other children included: Adelaide (born about 1851 in Shanghai), Amelia (born about 1852 in Shanghai), Helen Mary (born about 1853 in Shanghai; died 10 February 1861 in Shanghai), Peter Felix MacKenzie Richards (born about 1863 in Shanghai; died 18 December 1920 in Colchester, Essex, England), and Frederick Edward Richards (born about 1864 in Shanghai).

== Career ==
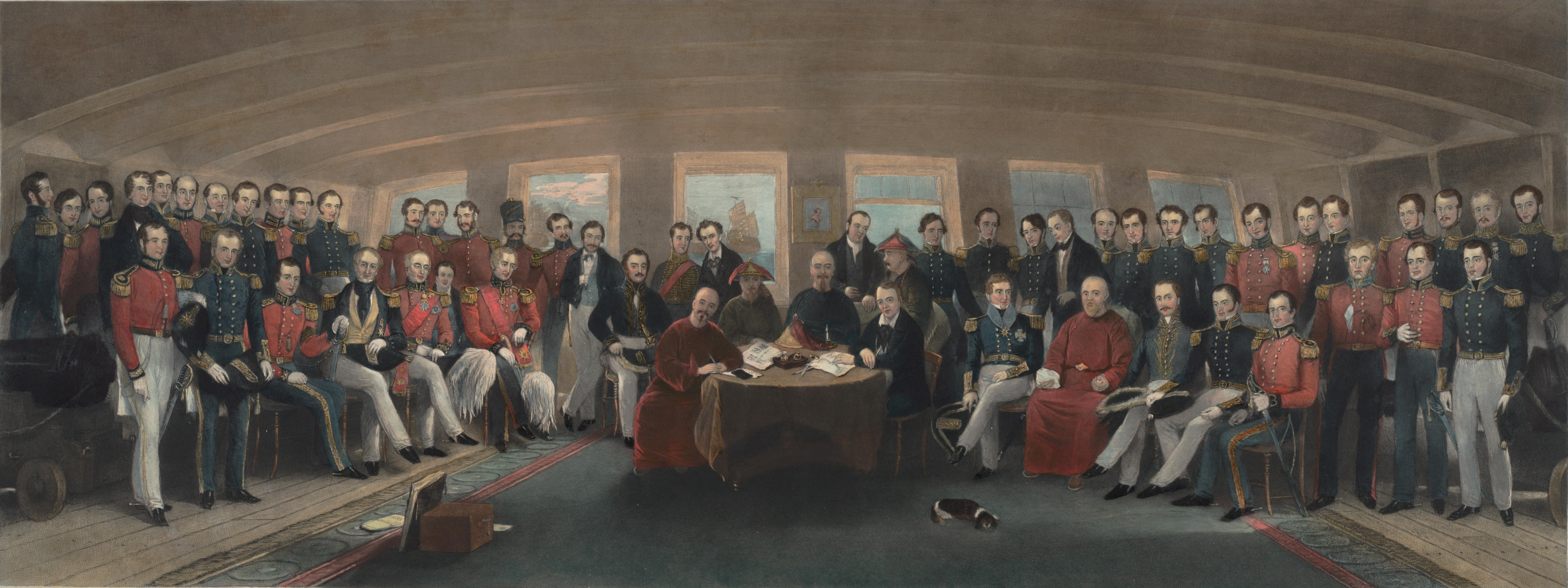
Signing of the Nanking Treaty, 1842

On 29 August 1842, the unequal Treaty of Nanjing was signed ending the First Opium War (1839–1842) between the British and Qing Empires, and establishing five treaty ports in China where British merchants could operate. In addition to Canton, Amoy, Fuzhou, and Ningbo, the port of Shanghai was opened officially to foreign trade on 17 November 1843. According to Shanghai historian F.L. Hawks Pott, "The foreign population of the Settlement gradually increased. In 1844 it was 50, in the following year, 90, and after five years it had grown to 175. In addition there was a floating population, consisting of the men on shore from the ships in harbour."

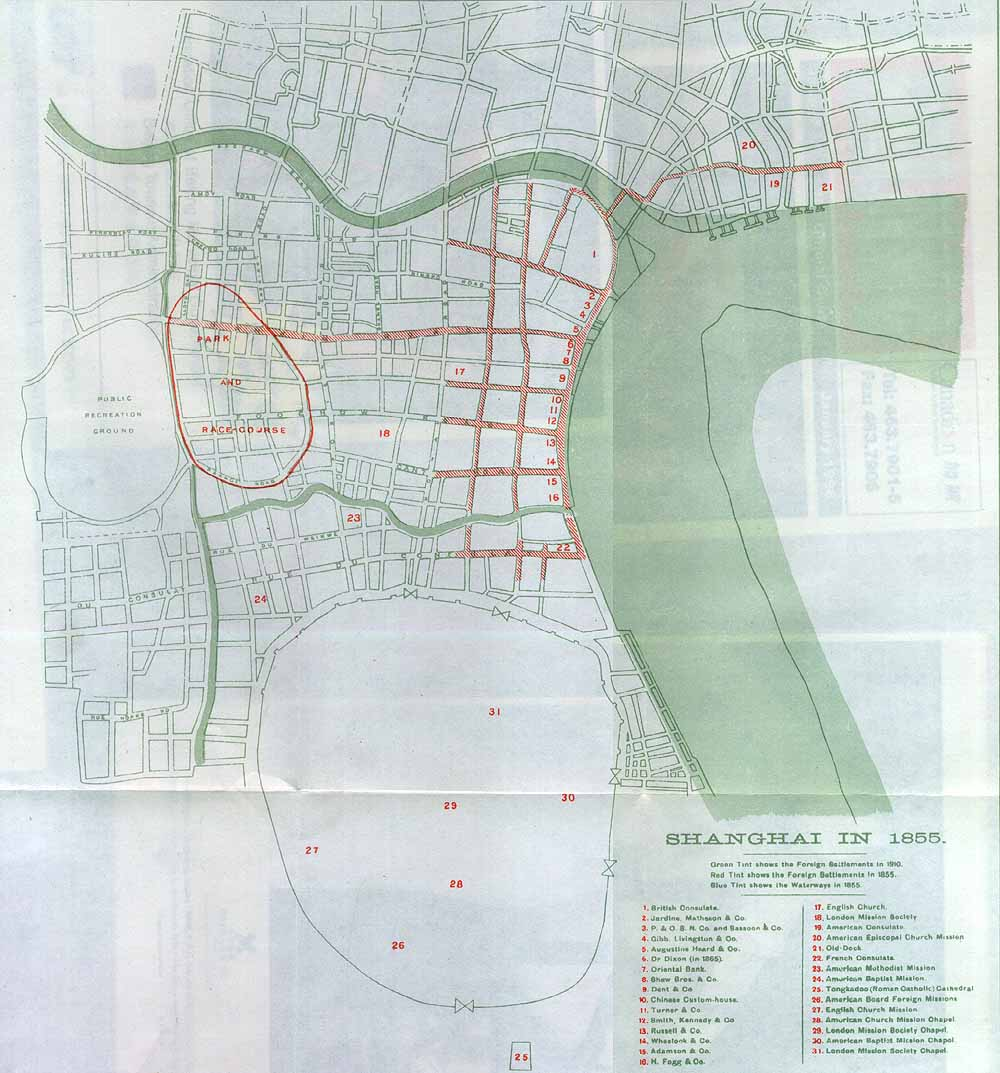
Map of Shanghai, 1855

=== Shanghai (1844-1856) ===
Peter Felix Richards, who had been doing business in China from about 1840, was one of the first foreign residents of Shanghai. During 1844 Richards established P.F. Richards & Co. (Shanghai and Fuzhoufu) (i.e., Fuzhou), which operated a general store, ship chandler, and commission agent business, on 4th Avenue (四马路) (now Fuzhou Road; 福州路) about a "block and a half to the west" of Sichuan Road. P.F. Richards & Co. imported and sold staples of English diets, including "orange marmalade, cheddar and stilton cheese, mustard, oatmeal, cocoa powder, and oil of Bergamot, as well as French olives and Turkish figs", as well as soda water and aerated lemonade.

According to Pott: "The foreign population was then something over 100, of whom seven were ladies. There were 25 mercantile firms engaged in business." In 1846, Richards opened one of the first western restaurants in Shanghai and the first western hotel in China, south of Yangjingbang Creek on the river front on The Bund facing the Huangpu River near Jinling Road East, in the Huangpu District of Shanghai, in what became in 1849 the French Concession. Named after its founder, Richards' Hotel and Restaurant (礼查饭店; "Licha"; Lee-zo), was "a single and ordinary building", in the Baroque style. that targeted initially the seafaring clientele that made up the bulk of travelers to 19th century Shanghai. The very first public meeting of the British settlement was in the newly opened Richards' Hotel on 22 December 1846. By May 1851 Richards added an auction service to his business.

By 1854 Richards was the owner of the Pekin, a lugger-rigged vessel, that successfully eluded a fleet of Chinese pirate junks, on a voyage originating in Shanghai on 10 June, with Richards on board. After an auction in Shanghai on 27 March 1855, Richards purchased the ship Margaret Mitchell, which had run aground off Woosong on 1 February 1855 and required extensive repairs to make it seaworthy, from its master, Thomas Jameson for $20,000, (then worth nearly £7,000), which was paid on 16 April 1855. Additionally, repairs were estimated initially to cost at least $40,000, but increased due to further damage after a collision with the dry dock gate at Shanghai on 4 April 1855. Richards had to mortgage the ship and other assets to finance the purchase, repairs and subsequent return voyage to England at an interest rate of 24%. On 26 March 1855 John Dewsnap, an American engineer who had constructed the dry dock at Hongkou in 1852, defended successfully a lawsuit brought by Jameson in the United States Consular Court of Shanghai for $20,000 for his part in causing the damage in the collision with the dry dock's gate. After 15 September 1855, the Margaret Mitchell left Shanghai under the control of ship master Captain Dewey Stiles, and after stops at Canton; Whampoa, where a mortgage of £1,336 was obtained from Anthon & Co. to finance insurance of the freight and the ship; Batavia; and Amsterdam, arrived in London on 23 May 1856, by which time Richards had discharged the mortgage obtained in Hong Kong. Two of Rebecca's brothers, James Mackenzie (born 1830) and David Mackenzie (born 1834), assisted in the operation of Richards' business until their termination in September 1857.

From the Chinese New Year (6 February) 1856, Richards announced that his would take Mexican dollars at par value to make purchases and settle accounts, however this decision was rescinded on 1 March 1856, and the discounted rate would be in effect. After 1 March 1856, Richards announced that his company would be renamed "Richards & Co.".

=== USA and England (1856-1857) ===
In preparation for his imminent trip to the United States of America and England to arrange more suppliers for his business, on 1 March Richards announced that during his absence that James McKenzie would manage his operations in Shanghai, while George D. Symonds would manage his interests in Fuzhou, and that both were authorised to sign by procuration. On 15 May 1856, while in New York, Richards' company was declared insolvent by decree of the British Consular Court in Shanghai, and all of his assets (including the Margaret Mitchell and the Richards' Hotel) were assigned provisionally to his creditors, Britons William Herbert Vacher and Charles Wills (died 8 September 1857), acting on behalf of Gilman, Bowman and Jardine, Matheson respectively. Vacher and Wills authorised James McKenzie to continue to manage the store and ship chandlery "under inspection".

By early June 1856 Richards planned to leave New York to return to England in order to sell the Margaret Mitchell to ameliorate his financial situation. However, Richards' ownership of the Margaret Mitchell was disputed by Thomas Mitchell of Glasgow, the original owner, and by another group who had purchased it from Stiles, the ship's master, upon its return to England.

=== Shanghai (1857-1861) ===
On 16 August 1857, Daniel Brooke (D.B.) Robertson (born 1810; died 27 March 1881 at Piccadilly), the British Consul of Shanghai announced that Richards' insolvency was superseded with the approval of his creditors. The following day, Richards announced that he was personally resuming control and management of his business in China. In February 1858 Richards' store and the Richards Hotel and Restaurant were relocated to a site on the northern banks of the Suzhou Creek, near its confluence with the Huangpu River in the Hongkou District of Shanghai. On 5 February 1858 Richards announced that:

We beg to give notice that we have removed from our Establishment to the Premises expressly built for us, immediately after crossing the New Bridge between the British and American Consulates. The Premises command a beautiful view of the whole front settlement and of the surrounding country and down towards Wusong as far as the eye can reach. They have also a commanding and central river position remarkably well adapted for Shipping Business; we Have spared no expense to make the Store convenient and safe for Goods.

In August 1858 the Privy Council determined that the Margaret Mitchell had been sold legally to Richards and was now the property of his insolvency assignees.

By 1859 the hotel was renamed (in English) the Astor House Hotel, while retaining the original Chinese name until 1959. According to actress Grace Hawthorne, who stayed at the Astor House in 1894: "The man who named it, some thirty years ago or so, had been to New-York and found in the Astor House a model of elegance and hotel excellence. He returned to Shanghai, and forthwith named his hotel the Astor House. According to John B. Powell, "He christened his establishment in honor of the then most famous hotel in the United States, the Astor House in New York; however, he was compelled to add the designation "hotel," as the fame of the New York hostelry had not yet reached the China coast. Aside from the name, the two establishments had little in common."

Even after the sale of the Astor House Hotel to Englishman Henry W. Smith on 1 January 1861, Richards and his wife were still residents of the Astor House at the time that their seven-year-old daughter, Helen Mary Richards, died on 10 February 1861.

=== Later years (1861-1868) ===
By 17 March 1861, Richards had relocated to Tianjin, where he had established himself as an "Agent ... to carry on business generally with the Chinese in Imports and Exports, having had twenty one years experience in business in China and being acquainted with the language sufficiently to transact business without the assistance of Compradors." In March 1862 Richards was described as "an enterprising speculator". By 1863 Richards was back in Shanghai, when his son Peter Felix MacKenzie Richards was born. Another son, Frederick Edward was also born in China by 1865.

It seems that by 1866 that Richards was residing in the port city of Yantai, described in May 1865 as a town of "little commercial importance" and "one of the most wretched dens", with about 70 European residents,

Richards died on 14 November 1868 in Shanghai, aged 60, and left an estate valued at less than £2. Subsequently, his widow, Rebecca, and their five surviving children returned to Britain.

== Posterity ==
In 1871 Richards' wife, Rebecca, was living as an annuitant in her hometown at 56 Southesk Street, Brechin, Angus, Scotland, with her daughter, Adelaide, and her two sons: Peter Felix MacKenzie Richards, and Frederick Edward Richards. By 1881 Rebecca Richards was living at Newington, Edinburgh, Scotland, where she was a lodging house keeper, with her two sons: Frederick, a commercial clerk; and Peter, an apprentice engineer. In 1891 Rebecca Richards was living at 88 Polwarth Gardens, Newington, Edinburgh, with her daughter, Rebecca A. Richards, who was employed as a governess.

In 1871 Richards' oldest child, Rebecca A. Richards, aged 23, was employed as a governess at the Ladies' Seminary at Hovingham, Yorkshire.

In 1871 Amelia, aged 19, was a pupil teacher at 8 Westgate, Grantham, Lincolnshire. In 1901 Amelia was still unmarried, and working as a tutor at 45-55 Aynhoe Road, Hammersmith, London.

In 1891 Peter was employed as a civil engineer, and lived in two rented rooms at 28 Parchmore Road, Thornton Heath, Croydon. From 6 December 1892 Peter was a member of the Institution of Civil Engineers. On 24 June 1893 Peter, then living at 21 Great George Street, London, changed his name by deed poll to Peter Mackenzie-Richards. On 4 September 1893 Peter married Mary Edith "Mollie" MacRae (born 1 July 1869 in Brighton, Sussex; died 7 December 1954 at Heigham Hall, a private mental hospital in Norwich, Norfolk), at St. Leonard's Church, London Road, Upper Deal, Kent. They had four children: Kenneth Mackenzie-Richards (born about September 1894 in Kensington; died 26 December 1980); Campbell MacKenzie-Richards (born 6 January 1900; died 9 November 1927); Ursula Mackenzie-Richards (born 13 November 1902; died 11 December 1995); died 11 December 1995); and Mary Mackenzie-Richards (born 1907 in Woodbridge, Suffolk; died 1983). By 1901 Peter and Molly, and their younger son, Campbell, were living in apartment 4 at the red-brick Georgian era Clapham Mansions, Nightingale Lane, Clapham Common, Streatham, Wandsworth. From at least 1900 until 1916 Peter's offices were at 53 Victoria Street, Victoria, London. Peter died on 18 December 1920 in Colchester, Essex. While the death certificate indicates that Peter Mackenzie-Richards died of "Aortic Incompetence", "Pulmonary Congestion", and "Hepatic Congestion", family tradition suggests his death was as a result of the Spanish flu.

By 1893, Frederick was employed as a merchant. On 18 February 1893 Frederick married Lillian Annie Webb (born about 1865 in Clapham), the oldest child of George Webb (born about 1834 in London; died before 1893), a deceased silversmith and cutler, and Annie T. Webb (born about 1840 in Streatham), at the Church of Saint Saviour, South Hampstead, London. By 1894, Frederick and Lillian were living in Foo Chow, China, where he was employed as a clerk by commercial agents Dodwell, Carlill & Co. Their daughter, Hilda W.L. Richards (born about 1894), and son, Ronald Edward Mackenzie Richards (born 13 March 1895; died 13 November 1914 near Ypres) were both born in Foo Chow. In 1901 Hilda, age 6, and Ronald, age 5, were living at Newlands Lodge, Collinsons Lane, Hitchin, Hertfordshire with two of their unmarried aunts, Ethel M. Webb (born about 1868 in Clapham ) and Elsie G. Webb (born about 1878 in Clapham).
