= William Herbert Vacher =

British merchant and banker

William Herbert Vacher (ca.1826 in London – 1899 in Hastings, England) was a prominent British merchant and banker who was a member of the Shanghai Municipal Council, a chairman of the British Chamber of Commerce in Shanghai, founding manager of the London branch of The Hongkong and Shanghai Banking Corporation.

== Biography ==
=== Early years and family ===
William Herbert Vacher was born in 1826 in London. On 17 November 1855 Vacher married Elizabeth (born about 1833) only daughter of Edward King of Shanghai and previously of Brixton, Surrey, at the Holy Trinity Church in Shanghai, China. Subsequently, Vacher and his wife had seven children, two of whom were born in China.

=== Career ===
From 1844 Vacher was a resident in Canton, China. By 1846 Vacher had become a member of the firm of Gilman, Bowman & Co. (Tae-ping), a British hong established by Richard James Gilman and Abram Bowman as a tea trader in 1840, (later Gilman & Co. after the retirement of Bowman). In 1850 Vacher was listed as still resident in Canton.

By 1851 Vacher had transferred to Shanghai, where from 9 August he was an authorised representative of Gilman, Bowman, & Co. Vacher was a member of the Shanghai Municipal Council from 1852 to at least 1856, where he was a member of the Committee to study the erection of a new building for the Shanghai Library in 1852, and also a member of Committee II: Assessments of Foreign-owned property. In August 1855 Vacher was still resident in Shanghai. In May 1856 Vacher and Charles Wills (died in Shanghai in 1857) were assigned the assets of bankrupt British merchant Peter Felix Richards (died in China in 1868), which included the lugger-rigged vessel the Margaret Mitchell, and the Richards Hotel and Restaurant.

Vacher was a leading freemason, who was President of the North China Lodge of the United Grand Lodge of England in 1852 and 1855, presided over the first English Mark Masters Lodge of Shanghai on 15 December 1854. By 1859 Vacher was the chairman of the influential Shanghai British Chamber of Commerce.

In 1859 Vacher was listed as a resident in Ningbo. Vacher's interest in Gilman & Co. ceased on 2 July 1860. Vacher retired as a partner in Gilman & Bowman in 1865.

In 1865 Vacher and his family returned to England, where he became the first manager of the London office of the newly established The Hongkong and Shanghai Banking Corporation later that year. In 1873 Vacher was forced to resign when it was discovered that he "had made disastrous speculations in South American railways, and had lost both on his own and the bank's account" £81,000.

By 1888 Vacher was a member of the Society for Psychical Research (SPR), and living at 54 Addison Mansions, in Kensington.

=== Later years ===
Vacher died at the age of 73 on 23 February 1899 at 44 Cambridge Gardens, Hastings, Sussex, England.
