= Skyhook (cable) =

Hypothetical aerial technology

A skyhook is a "hook" used to lift an object on a long cable hanging from the sky, without readily apparent support. In the mid-20th century it was common in the Boy Scouts and occupations such as oil drilling to send new recruits on a futile search for such an imaginary object, as a practical joke. In construction, when material or equipment arrives onsite before the foundations are designed or built, the common remark voiced, "The office wants us to use skyhooks!"

The term has subsequently lent its name to some real mechanisms that use an airborne hook or hoist, and to other products or ideas that allude to the concept. The American philosopher Richard Rorty uses the term to refer to a hypothetical metaphysical system that leads to a universal perspective. In his book Darwin's Dangerous Idea, Daniel Dennett furthers this usage of the term, claiming that evolutionary biologists who are not strict Darwinians hold out hope for some sort of metaphysical "skyhook" to explain the existence of things like human consciousness.
