= Thomas Jansen House =

- Thomas Jansen's House
- U.S. National Register of Historic Places
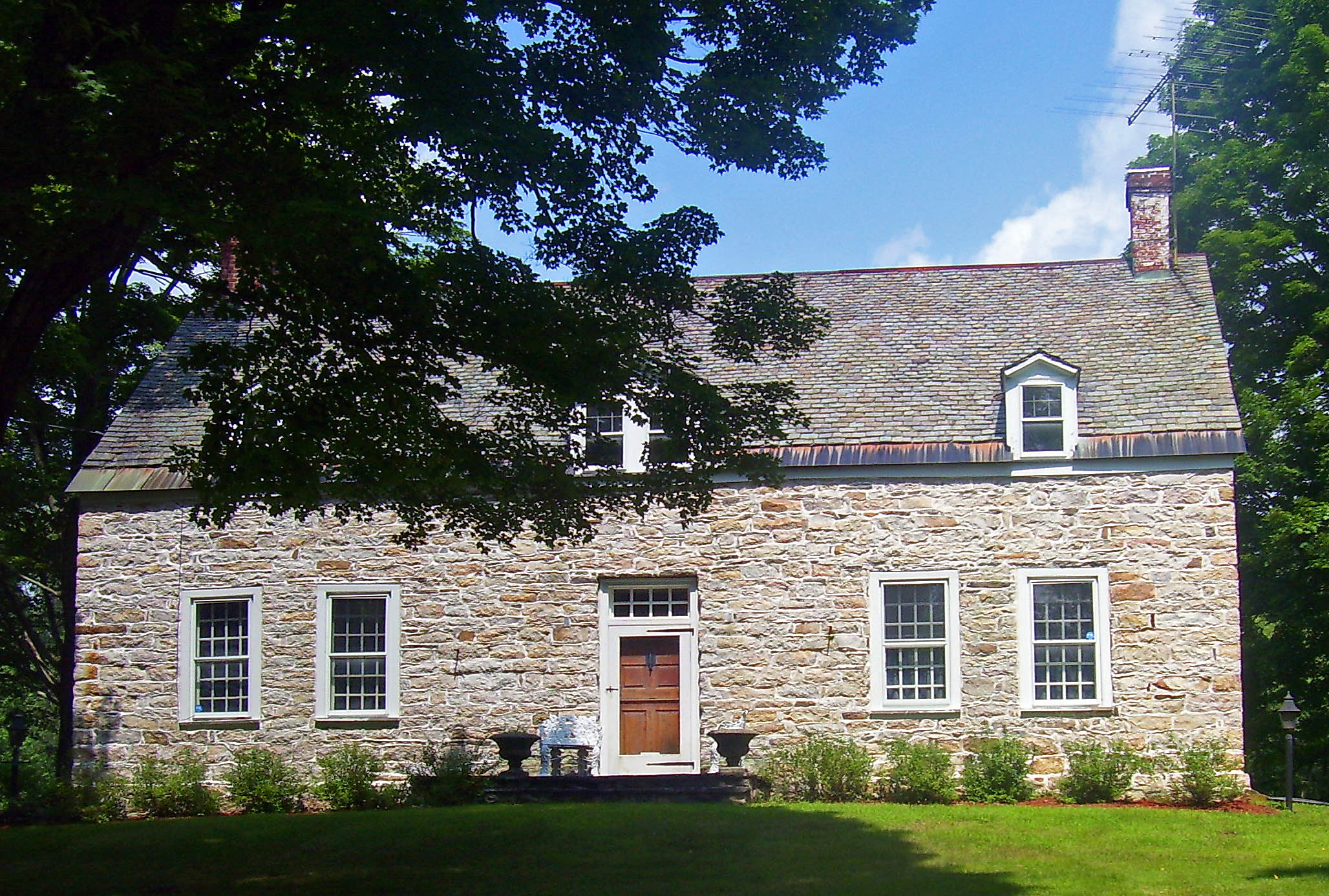
- The house in 2007, showing 1780 structure with modern TV aerial. Original 1727 house is in rear.

- Location within New York Location within the United States
- Location: Town of Shawangunk, NY
- Nearest city: Middletown
- Coordinates: 41°39′09″N 74°17′31″W
- Area: 38.6 acres (15.6 ha)
- Built: 1727, 1780
- MPS: Shawangunk Valley MRA
- NRHP reference No.: 83001817
- Added to NRHP: September 26, 1983

The Thomas Jansen's House, also known as Dwaarkill Manor, is a historic home located on Jansen Road in the western section of the Town of Shawangunk, in Ulster County, New York, United States. It is a Dutch stone house built first in 1727 by Jansen, an early settler of the area. In 1780, his family built the current house; the original survives as a rear wing, a common practice in the area.

It was listed on the National Register of Historic Places in 1983.
