= Astor House Hotel (Shanghai) =

Hotel in Shanghai, China

Astor House Hotel Pujiang Hotel 浦江饭店
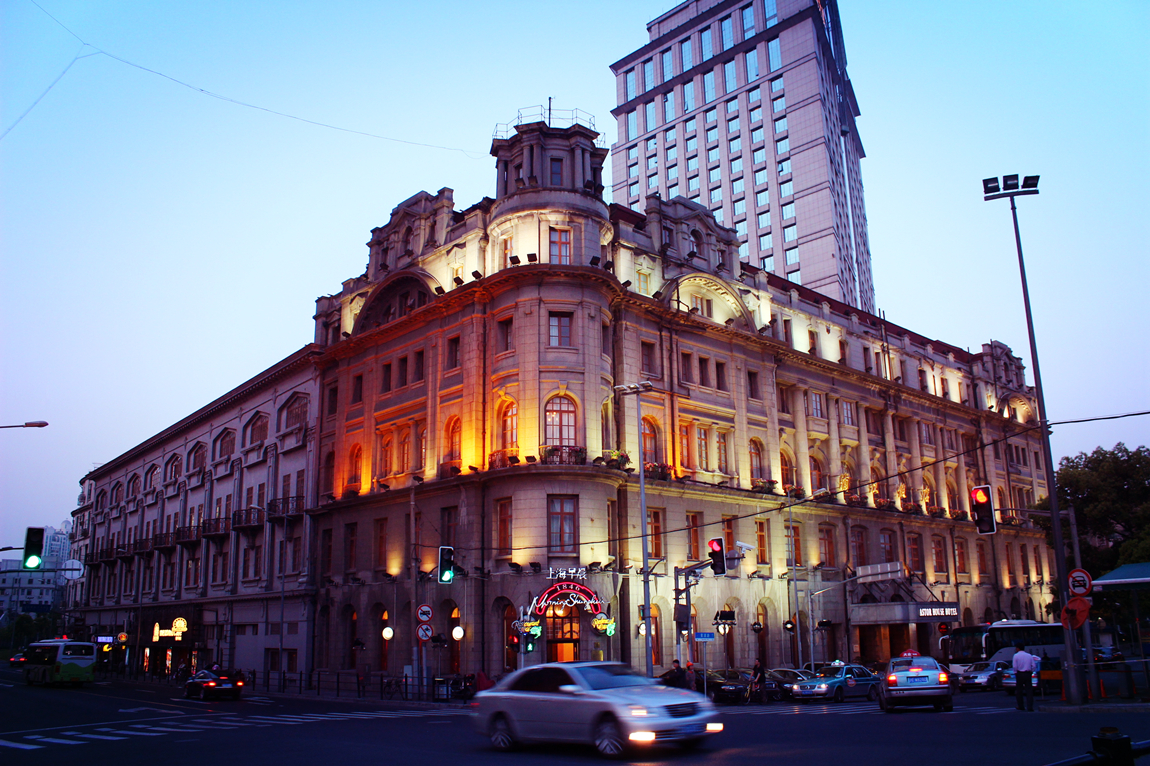

General information
- Location: 15 Huangpu Road, Hongkou District, Shanghai
- Coordinates: 31.24604°N 121.48657°E
- Opening: February 1858, Northern wing: 1903; Reopening: 16 January 1911
- Closed: 1 January 2018
- Owner: Shanghai Hengshan Mountain Group (上海衡山集团).

Technical details
- Floor count: 6
- Floor area: 16,563 square metres

Design and construction
- Architects: Renovation: Davies & Thomas; Annex: Atkinson & Dallas: Brenan Atkinson (until 1907), G.B. Atkinson (from 1907)

Other information
- Number of rooms: 134 rooms and suites

Website
- http://www.pujianghotel.com

The Astor House Hotel, known as the Pujiang Hotel (浦江饭店) in Chinese from 1959 to 2018, was described as once "one of the famous hotels of the world". Established in 1846 as Richards' Hotel and Restaurant (礼查饭店) on The Bund in Shanghai, it was located at 15 Huangpu Lu, Shanghai, near the confluence of the Huangpu River and the Suzhou Creek in the Hongkou District, near the northern end of the Waibaidu (Garden) Bridge, from 1858 on. The hotel closed on 1 January 2018, after being purchased by an undisclosed local business. It was converted to the China Securities Museum, which opened in December 2018.

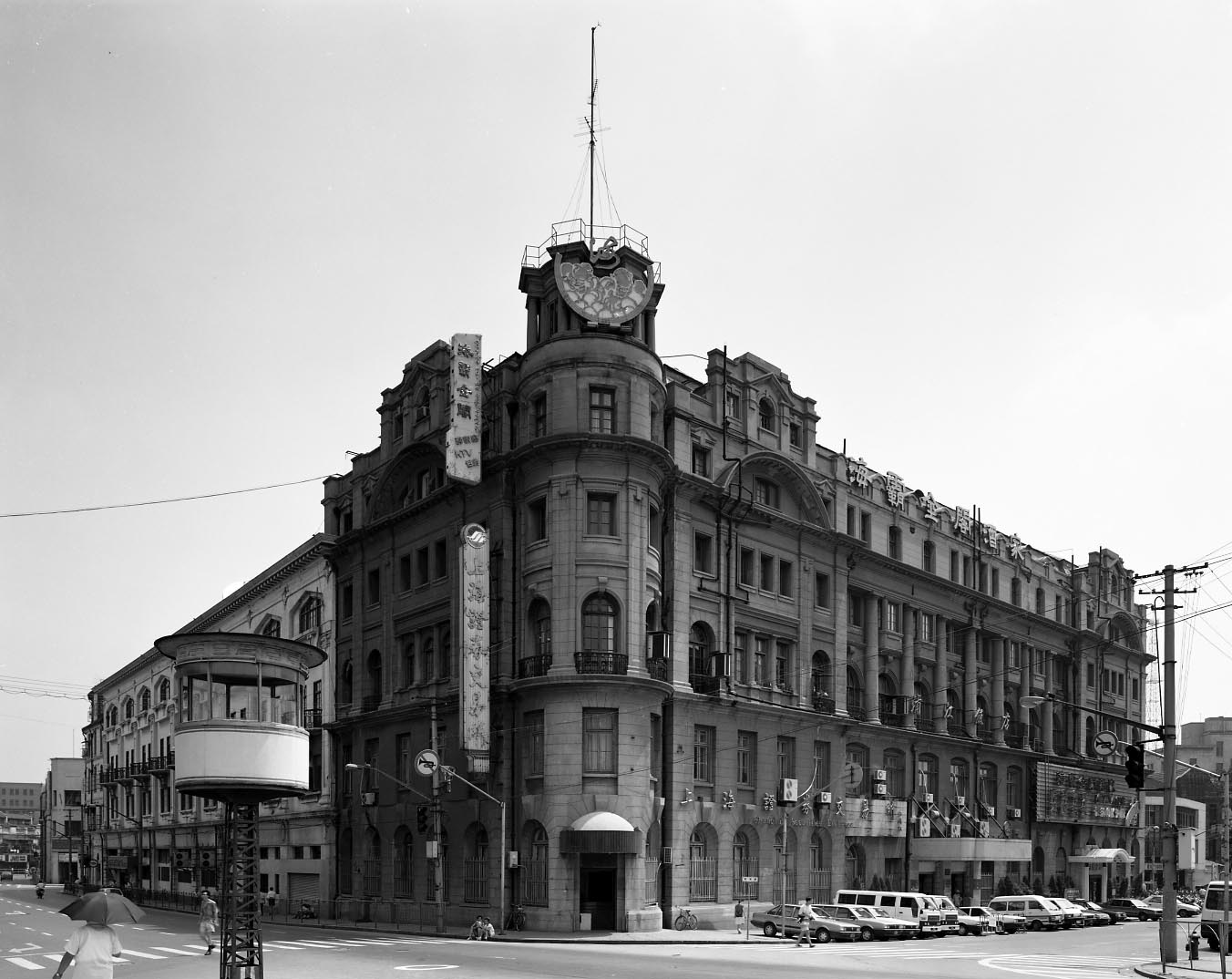
Astor House

== Location ==
The Astor House Hotel has been on the North Bund of Shanghai, by the northern end of the Waibaidu Bridge, since 1858. The hotel is on a 4,580 square metres (49,300 sq ft) site and has a total building area of 16,563 m^{2} (178,280 sq ft) with 134 rooms and suites. It was a landmark in the Hongkou District and the centre of foreign social life before the opening of the Cathay Hotel. It occupies an entire block, and is across the road from the Russian Consulate. Previously, the consulates of Germany, the United States and Japan were also located in row up the row from the Hotel.

== Background ==
On 29 August 1842, the Treaty of Nanjing declared Shanghai to be one of five open treaty ports in China, the others being Guangzhou, Amoy, Fuzhou, and Ningbo. On 17 November 1843, Shanghai was declared open to foreign traders, and soon after the British concession in Shanghai was established and the boundaries gradually defined. Afterward, the resident foreign population of the British concession increased: "In 1844 [at years end] it was 50, in the following year 90, and after five years it had grown to 175. In addition there was a 'floating population,' consisting of the men on shore from the ships in harbour."

== Richards' Hotel and Restaurant (1846–1859) ==
Among the first foreign residents of Shanghai was Peter Felix Richards, a Scottish merchant. Richards had been doing business in China from about 1840; and in 1844 had established P.F. Richards & Co. (of Shanghai and Fuzhou). P.F. Richards operated a general store, a ship chandler, and a commissioned agent business on 4th Avenue (四馬路, now Fuzhou Road). In 1846, Richards opened one of the first Western restaurants in Shanghai and the first Western hotel in China. These were located south of the Yangkingpang (Yangjingbang) creek.

=== Peter Felix Richards (1846–1859) ===
The hotel was "a single and ordinary building" built in the Baroque style, which initially targeted the seafaring clientele that made up the bulk of travelers to 19th century Shanghai. One contemporaneous account describes corridors and floors whose color and design echoed those on ships. Almost a century later, John B. Powell erroneously recounted the origins of the Hotel: "The Astor House Hotel ... had grown from a boarding house established originally by the skipper of some early American clipper, who left his ship at Shanghai. A string of sea captains followed the original as managers of the hotel. The very first public meeting of the British settlement was held in the newly opened Richards' Hotel on 22 December 1846. In August 1850 Richards advertised that a reading room for shipmasters had been established in his hotel. On 1 March 1856 his company was renamed "Richards & Co." and on 15 May 1856, while in New York on business, Richards' company was declared insolvent by decree of the British Consular Court in Shanghai, and all of his assets (including the Richards' Hotel) were assigned provisionally to his creditors, Britons William Herbert Vacher and Charles Wills.

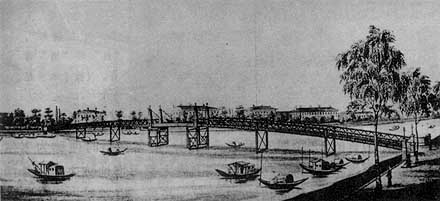
Wills' Bridge

According to Shanghai historian Peter Hibbard, the completion of the Wills Bridge allowed the expansion of the over-crowded settlement. Wills, who owned the land on the northern side of Suzhou Creek, benefited from increased property values. During 1857 Wills leased a lot that was slightly larger than 22 mu (15,000 m^{2} (160,000 sq ft)) in a section of reclaimed mud flats in Hongkew east of Broadway (now Daming Lu) on the northern banks of the Soochow Creek, that was adjacent to the new bridge, and faced the Suzhou Creek near its confluence with the Huangpu River, "at a huge profit for the building of the Astor House Hotel." In February 1858 Richards' store and the Richards Hotel and Restaurant were relocated to the site leased from Charles Wills on the northern banks of the Suzhou Creek. The new Hotel was a two-story East India style building.

== The Astor House Hotel (1859–1959) ==
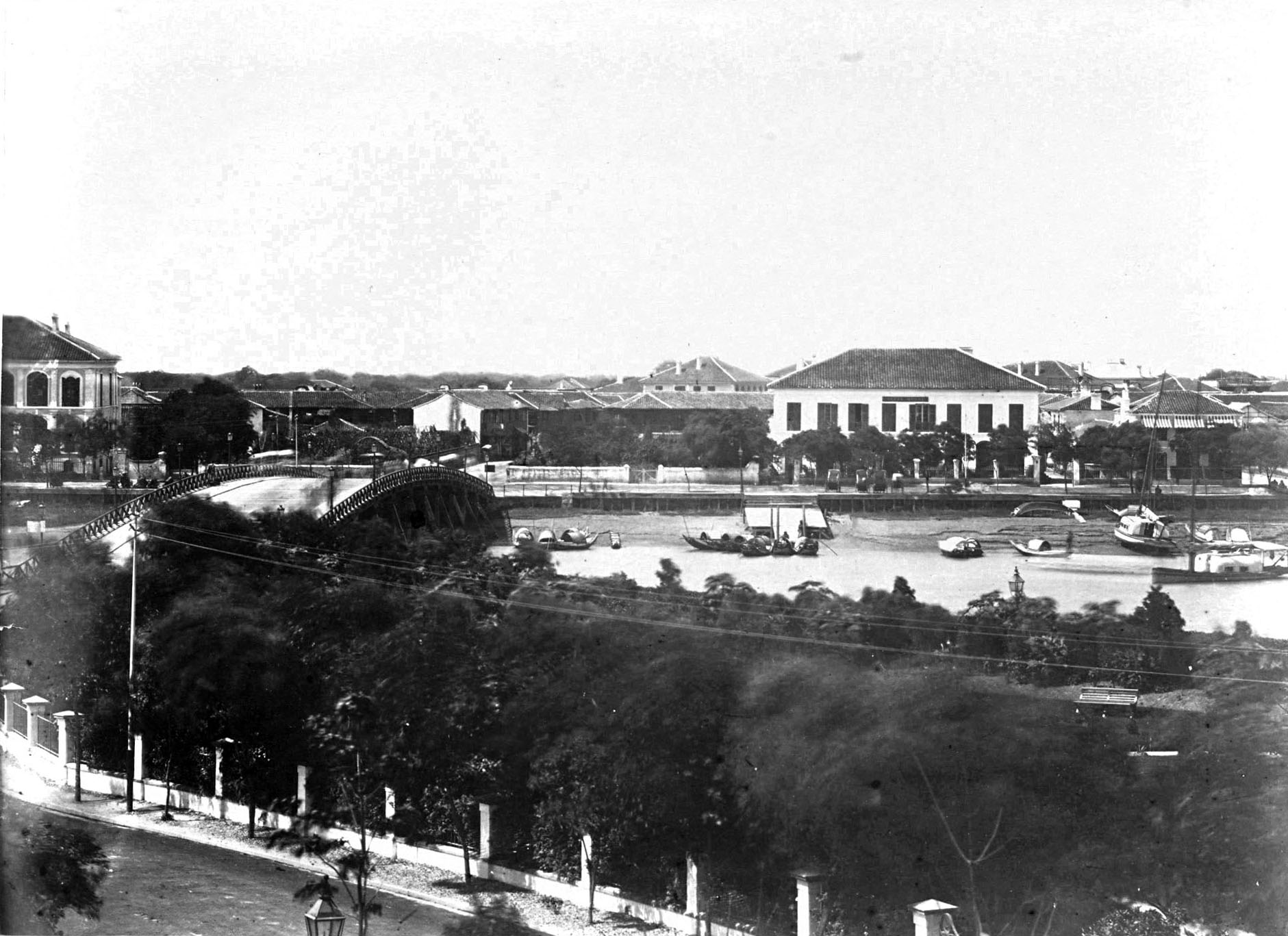
Garden Bridge & Astor House

In February 1858 Richards' store and the Richards Hotel and Restaurant were relocated to the site leased from Charles Wills on the northern banks of the Suzhou Creek, near its confluence with the Huangpu River in the Hongkou District of Shanghai. By 1859 the hotel was renamed (in English) the Astor House Hotel, while retaining the original Chinese name until 1959.

The Astor House Hotel was sold to Englishman Henry W. Smith on 1 January 1861; Richards and his wife were still residents of the Astor House when their seven-year-old daughter died on 10 February 1861. According to an 1862 guidebook, at that time the building also housed a "soda-water maker" by the name of F. Farr.

By October 1868 George Baker was the proprietor of the Astor House. By August 1873 it had been purchased by DeWitt Clinton Jansen.

=== Enlargement (1876) ===
Astor House Hotel

In 1876 the Astor House Hotel was enlarged, with fifty new rooms added that were often used to accommodate newly arrived families who were awaiting the completion of their own residences. After the 1876 expansion the hotel was "four large neo-Renaissance brick buildings linked together by stone passageways." American travel writer Thomas Wallace Knox (1835–1896) stayed there in 1879, providing a positive review in his Boy Travellers in the Far East.

In January 1877 plans were announced to construct Victorian Turkish baths on the Seward Road frontage as part of the expansion of the Astor House. In 1881 Jansen renewed his lease of the Astor House Hotel with the trustees of the Wills' Estate for a period of thirty years. In July 1882, the Astor House Hotel became the first building in China to be lit by electricity, and in 1883 it became the first building in Shanghai to install running water.

In 1882 the Astor House hosted the first Western circus in China. By the end of 1887, the Astor House was described by Simon Adler Stern as "the principal American hotel in Shanghai" The Astor House Hotel was "a landmark of the white man in the Far East, like Raffles Hotel in Singapore."

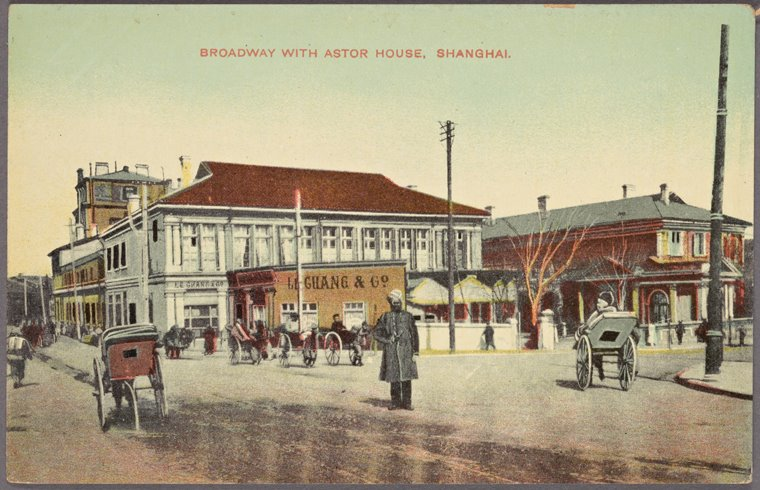
Postcard of Astor House Hotel, Shanghai, circa 1890

During 1889, The Shanghai Land Investment Company Limited (SLIC), which was formed in December 1888, purchased the "extensive estate known as the Wills' Estate, which includes the site of the Astor House Hotel, and possesses one of the best business situations in Hongkew" for 390,000 taels, approximately US$290,000. By the end of November 1889 Jansen agreed with the Shanghai Land Investment Company to transfer the Astor House Hotel and its land to the proposed Shanghai Hotel Company (SHC). To allow for the expansion of the Astor House and the construction of a new one-hundred bedroom hotel and large assembly hall, the SHC would also purchase the land at the back of the Hotel, so that the property would extend from Whangpoo (Huangpu) Road to Broadway, and from Astor Road to Seward Road.

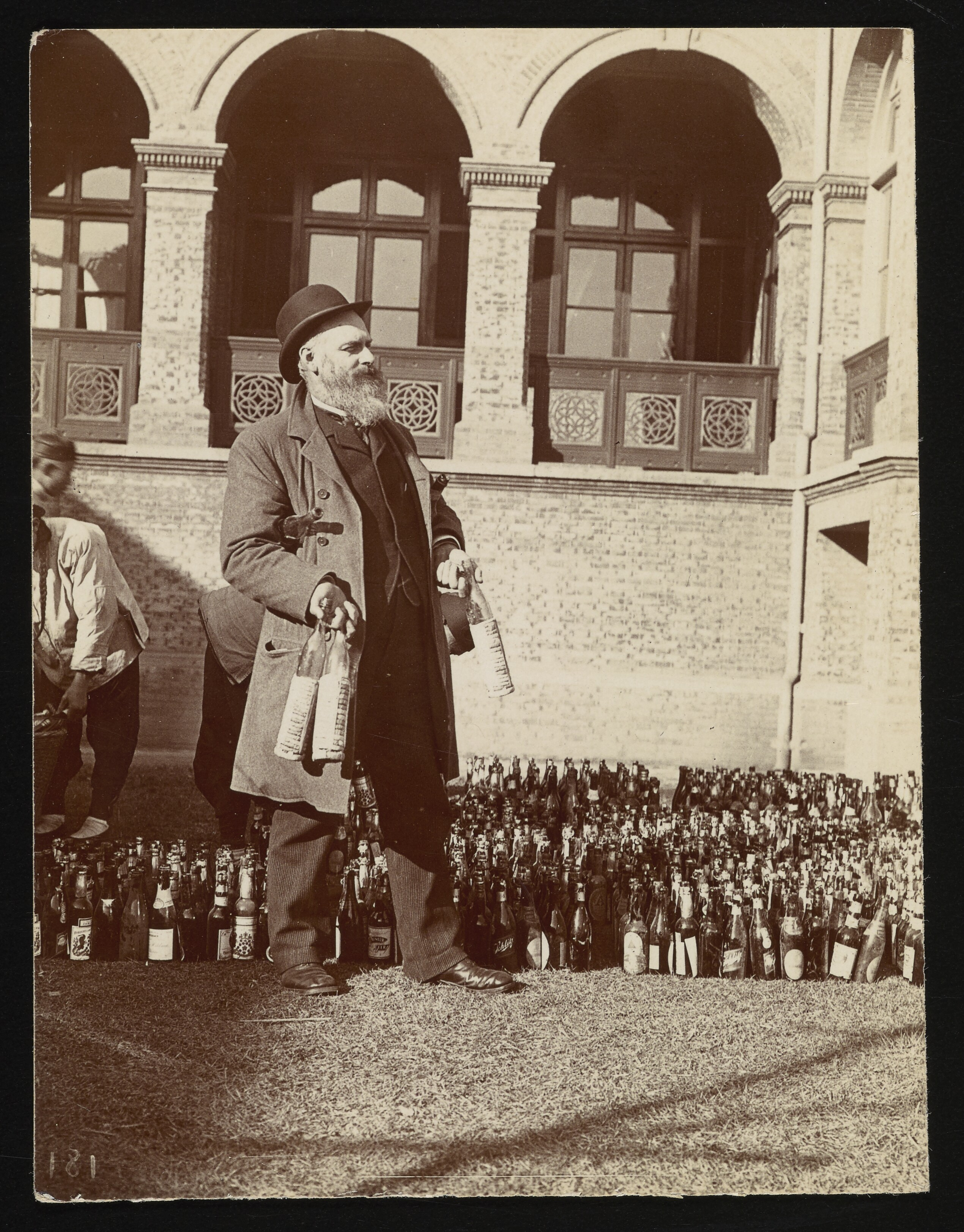
A hotel guest, possibly the mining engineer William H. Shockley, stands in the inner yard of the Astor House Shanghai in 1897.

By 1890, "For foreigners the Astor House was the center of social activity." Renovations to the Astor Hall were completed in time for the annual St. Andrew's Ball on Wednesday, 30 November 1892. In 1894 the Astor House was described as a "first class hotel in all these words imply" and was listed in Moses King's Where to Stop.": A Guide to the Best Hotels of the World.

After her husband's death, Ellen Jansen operated the Astor House. The Astor House remained in her control until 1 November 1900. By 1896 the Hotel was managed by Canadian-born Lewis M. Johnson, who was responsible for booking the first motion pictures to be shown in Shanghai on Saturday 22 May 1897 in Astor Hall. On 5 November 1897, China's first prom was hosted at the Astor House, which celebrated the 60th birthday of Cixi, the Emperor Dowager, thus "ending the social stricture that women should not attend social events"; One traveller indicated in 1900, "the Astor-House Hotel at Shanghai, it might be called European with a few Chinese characteristics. We of course had Chinese to wait on us here".

=== Auguste Vernon era (1901–1902) ===
In July 1901, Vernon privately floated the Astor House Hotel Co. Ltd. with a capital of $450,000. 4,500 shares were issued for $100 each, and were fully subscribed with Vernon or his nominees taking 4,494 shares, with the remaining shares purchased by six separate individuals. The shares were soon trading for up to $300 each. The Astor House Hotel Ltd. was "incorporated under the Company Ordinances of Hong Kong", with Vernon becoming the managing director.

Later that month, as a response to the severe shortage of accommodation in the rapidly growing International settlement, Vernon was able to convince the company to negotiate an extension of the current nine-year lease of the hotel and its property with the Land Investment Company for an additional twenty-one years, of the entire block, which included all the Chinese shops at the rear of the hotel, thus greatly expanding its holding but also increasing substantially the company's debt. Vernon intended to demolish the Chinese shops to allow the construction of a new three-storied wing containing 250 rooms, thus increasing its capacity to 300 rooms, with the ground floor of the new wing to provide first class accommodation for retail stores. Debentures with a return of 6% were issued in July 1901 to finance the expansion of the hotel, with the expectation that the increased number of rooms would generate a surplus of income to repay the dentures expeditiously.

In 1902, after less than two years of leadership, Vernon retired because of ill-health, and left owing the company "a considerable sum of money". By 1904, Vernon was living in Tangku (Tanggu), and was the owner of the steamship George, which was seized that year off Liaotishan as a prize of war by the Empire of Japan, after transferring goods to Russia during the Russo-Japanese War. Subsequently Vernon was manager of the Hotel de France and from 1916 the Keihin Hotel in Kamakura, Japan.

=== Louis Ladow (1903–1904) ===
As Vernon had planned, the Chinese shops that occupied the newly leased property at the rear of the existing hotel were demolished. However, the new northern section of the hotel contained only 120 rooms, less than half of the number that Vernon had envisaged. An outbreak of cholera in the city resulted in few guests when the northern wing was opened in November 1903. It was managed originally by "an eccentric American" octaroon, Louis Ladow (died in China on 20 November 1928), who had been imprisoned in Folsom Prison, who subsequently built the Grand Carleton Hotel in Shanghai in 1920. Under Ladow's supervision, his bartenders served "the finest cocktails in the Far East", a reputation it maintained through the 1930s.

=== A. Haller (1904) ===
In 1904, the Hotel was considered "by far the best hotel in the whole of the East, including Japan." At this time, Mr A. Haller was the manager. About this time, the Hotel's managers wrote letters "complaining to the foreign-run Shanghai Municipal Council about "natives," "coolies" and "rickshaws" making too much noise for patrons to bear."

=== Captain Frederick W. Davies (1906–1907) ===
By July 1906, retired British naval officer Captain Frederick W. Davies (born about 1850; died 16 January 1935 in Shanghai), who had previously been a sea captain on the NYK European Service, and associate manager of the Grand Hotel in Yokohama, had become manager of the Astor House, and "a more genial and hospitable gentleman never carried out the duties of that position." Room rates were between $7 and $10 per day (Mexican). The hotel employed 254 people, with each hotel department "under special European supervision". The 1904 announcement of the rebuilding of the Central Hotel (reopened in 1909 as the Palace Hotel) as a luxury hotel on the Bund, and the demolition of the nearby Garden Bridge, and construction of the current Waibaidu Bridge in 1907, which involved the resumption of part of the Astor House Hotel's property, forced the owners of the Astor House Hotel to begin extensive renovations.

=== Walter Brauen (1907–1910) ===
From February 1907, the hotel's manager was Swiss citizen Walter Brauen, a skilled linguist who had been recruited from Europe. The existing hotel was described as "the leading hotel of Shanghai...., but has an unpretentious appearance." The company decided to embark on a completely new hotel, "fitting of Shanghai's growth and importance" and "better than any in the Far East." In 1908, before any reconstruction or renovations, the Astor House was described in glowing terms:

Leading straight from the entrance to the main residential portion of the house is a long glass arcade. Upon one side of this are the offices, where the clerks and commissioners will attend promptly and courteously to every want; upon the other is a luxuriously furnished lounge, and, adjoining this, the reading, smoking, and drawing rooms. The dining room has accommodations for five hundred persons. It is lighted with hundreds of small electric lamps, whose rays are reflected by the large mirrors arranged around the walls, and when dinner is in progress, and the band is playing in the gallery, the scene is both bright and animated. There are some two hundred bedrooms, each with a bathroom adjoining, all of which look outward, facing either the city or the Huangpu River. Easy access is gained to the various floors upon which they are situated by electric elevators. The hotel...generates its own electricity and has its own refrigerating plant."

Architects and civil engineers Davies & Thomas (established in 1896 by Gilbert Davies and C.W, Thomas), were responsible for the re-building of the three principal wings of the Astor House Hotel. The Astor House Hotel was to be restored to a neo-classical Baroque structure, making it once again "the finest hotel in the Far East". The new addition (the Annex) was based on plans drawn by "Shanghai's leading architects of the time", British architects and civil engineers, Brenan Atkinson and Arthur Dallas (born 9 January 1860 in Shanghai; died 6 August 1924 in London), established as Atkinson & Dallas in 1898. After the death of principal architect Brenan Atkinson in 1907, he was replaced by his brother, G. B. Atkinson. The intention was to rebuild the hotel "on modern lines", using reinforced concrete as the primary building material. Included in the plans were: "the dining room, facing the Soochow Creek, is to be extended along the whole front of the building. Winter gardens are being constructed, the writing and smoking rooms, and the private bar and billiard room will be enlarged and the kitchen placed upon the roof." A new reinforced concrete wharf measuring 1,180 feet (360 m) long and 200 feet (61 m) wide was also constructed.

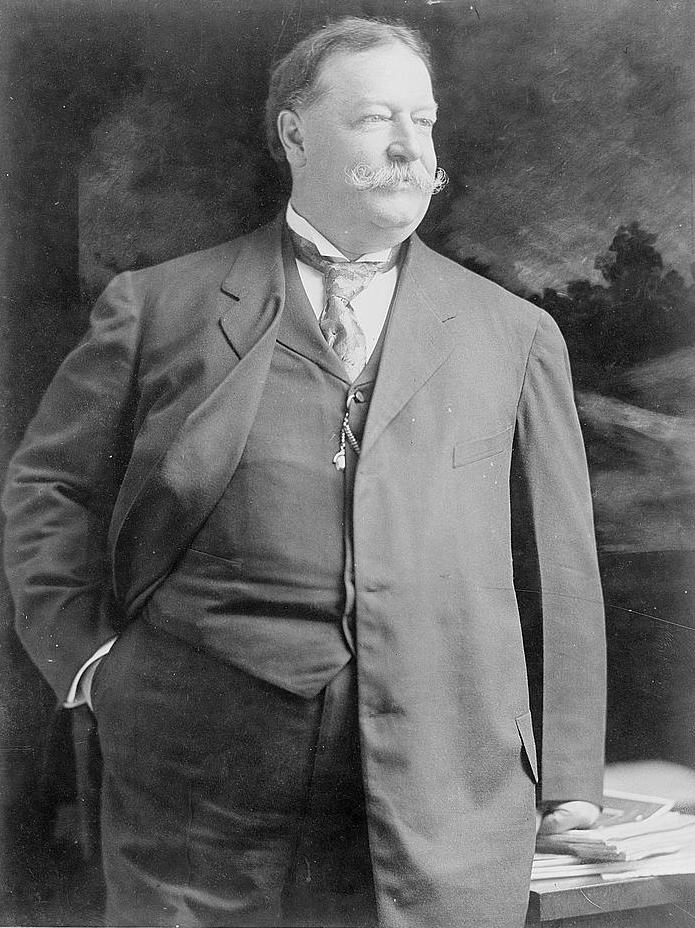
William Howard Taft

Prior to the new construction, future US President William Howard Taft, then US Secretary of War, and his wife, Helen Herron Taft, were honoured at a banquet organised by the American Association of China in the large dining room at the Astor House Hotel in Shanghai on 8 October 1907, with over 280 in attendance; it was, at that time, "the largest affair of the kind ever given in China." During the dinner, Taft made a significant speech on the relationship between the United States and China, and supporting the Open Door foreign policy previously advocated by John Hay. Organized Sunday School work in China was born at Shanghai on 4 May 1907. "This beginning of Sunday-school history in China took place in Room 128 of the Astor House, Shanghai, occupied at that time by Mr. [Frank A.] Smith."

The opening of a tram line in March 1908 over the new Garden bridge along Broadway (now Daming Lu) past the Astor House Hotel by the Shanghai British Trolley Company, greatly increased both access and business. Also in this period, the first western movies shown in China were shown at the Astor House Hotel. On 9 June 1908, a motion picture with some sound was first shown in China in the open air in the hotel's garden.

Construction finally commenced in November 1908, and was scheduled to be completed by July 1909. However, delays postponed completion until November 1910.

In September 1910, days after the annual meeting of the Astor House Hotel Co., Brauen "ran off with a huge chunk of hotel funds just three months before the hotel opened, six months behind schedule, in January 1911." A total of $957 had been embezzled by Brauen. A warrant for his arrest was issued by the Mixed Court of Shanghai, but Brauen had already left Shanghai on a Japanese steamship. Brauen was spotted in Nagasaki on Thursday, 14 September 1910, but evaded capture. At the annual meeting of Astor Hotel Co. in September 1911, Mr. F. Airscough, the chairman, reported that Brauen had been "a thoroughly capable hotel Manager" but who had "left our employment under most regrettable circumstances".

=== Re-opening (1911) ===
Costing $360,000, the restoration was completed in December 1910, and the official opening was on Monday, 16 January 1911. The North-China Herald reported:

The enduring impression of a city is largely given by the buildings that first catch the eye. The new Astor House Extension will greatly assist in bearing in upon the visitor that he is approaching no mean city. Favoured by its site, it stands out boldly and inspires a belief in the future of a city that can support such a huge caravanserai, in addition to others. The Shanghai resident regards it with equal admiration and also with a sense of personal pride. That gigantic edifice stands where, in the memory of many still living, the swamp-birds called defiantly to the struggling settlement that was finding its feet on the other side of the creek. It personifies to the resident the verification of the brightest dreams that in the old days the most daring dared to dream. A huge, but stately seal has in a sense been set upon the city's aspirations, and it stands at once as an emblem of accomplishment and an example for emulation.

Advertising itself as the Waldorf Astoria of the Orient', its new 211-room building, with a 500-seat dining room. Another advertisement described the Astor House Hotel in even more glowing terms: "Largest, Best and Most Modern Hotel in the Far East. Main Dining Room Seats 500 Guests, and is Electrically Cooled. Two hundred Bedrooms with Hot and Cold Baths Attached to Each Room. Cuisine Unexcelled; Service and Attention Perfect; Lounge, Smoking and Reading Rooms; Barber and Photographer on the Premises. Rates from $6; Special Monthly Terms." An advertisement in Social Shanghai in 1910 bragged, "The Astor House Hotel is the most central, popular and modern hotel in Shanghai. At the time of its re-opening in January 1911, the refurbished Astor House Hotel was described as follows:

Astor House Hotel Shanghai Dining Room

The building has five storeys and attics on the Whangpoo Road frontage and four storeys on the Astor Road side. On the ground floor, at the corner of Whangpoo Road and the Broadway, is a handsomely appointed public bar-room and buffet, 59 ft (18 m). by 51 ft (16 m) .; in the centre, with main entrance from Whangpoo Road, is a magnificent lounge ball, 70 ft (21 m). by 60 ft (18 m) ., and at the East end are the Hotel office and the manager's office, with the secretary's office, in mezzanine, above the latter. The basement fronting Astor Road contains store-rooms, the steam-heating apparatus, and motor fire-pump. The grand staircase, with marble dado and red panels on white background, leads upward to passenger lifts, a ladies cloak room, a very prettily furnished ladies' sitting room, a reading room with several comfortable sofas and easy chairs upholstered in leather, a private buffet with a polished teakwood bar, and a large billiard room. Farther up the grand staircase is the main dining hall, almost the whole length of the building with a gallery and verandah on the second floor and well lighted by a barreled ceiling of glass. On the Astor Road side is a handsome banqueting hall and reception rooms, both decorated in ivory and gold, and six private dining rooms. There were six service elevators, bedrooms with private sitting rooms, and luxury suites under the dome.

Additionally, the Hotel now had a 24-hour hot water supply, some of the earliest elevators in China, and each of the 250 guest rooms had its own telephone, as well as an attached bath. A major feature of the reconstruction was the creation of the Peacock Hall, "the city's first ballroom", "the most commodious ballroom in Shanghai". The newly restored Astor House Hotel was renowned for its lobby, special dinner-parties, and balls." According to Peter Hibbard, "[D]espite their architectural bravura and decorative grandeur, the formative years of both the Palace and Astor House Hotels were overshadowed by an inability to cater for the fast changing tastes of Shanghai society and her visitors". In 1911, John H. Russell, Jr. told his daughter, the future Brooke Astor, that the Hotel offered "the finest service in the world", and that in response to her question about "a man dressed in a white skirt and blue jacket beside every second door", was told by Russell: "They are the 'boys'. ... When you want your breakfast or your tea, just open the door and tell them."

=== William Logan Gerrard (1910–1915) ===
In October 1910, Scotsman William Logan Gerrard, who was a long-time resident of Shanghai, was appointed the new manager, but severe illness forced him into hospital for several weeks, before being invalided home temporarily. Soon after his release from the hospital, Gerrard married Gertrude Heard on Tuesday 19 July 1911 at the St. Joseph's Roman Catholic Church in the French Concession. That evening, they departed on their honeymoon in the USA and Scotland, and returned to Shanghai early in 1912. The Secretary of the Hotel, Mr. Whitlow, was appointed acting manager, but was soon replaced by Mr. Olsen.

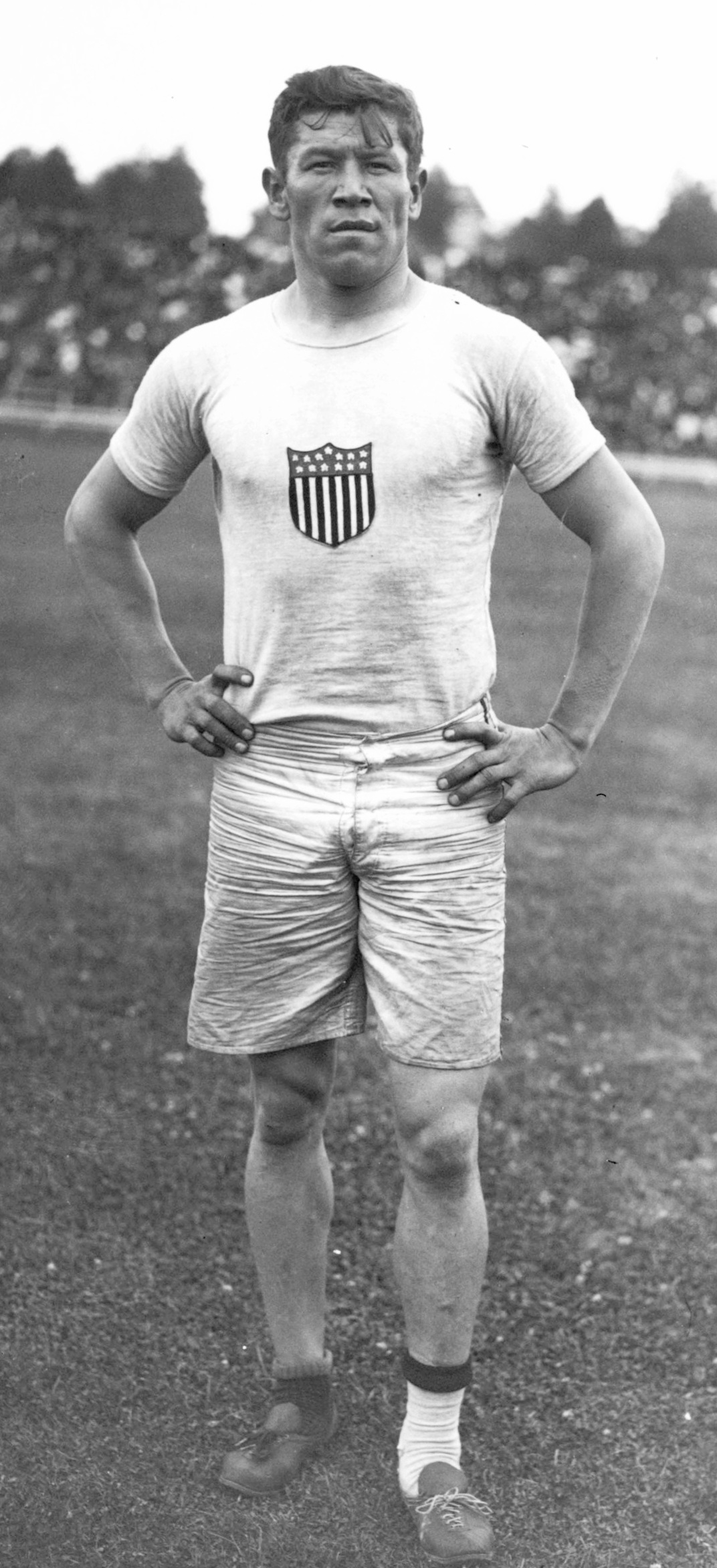
Jim Thorpe at 1912 Olympics

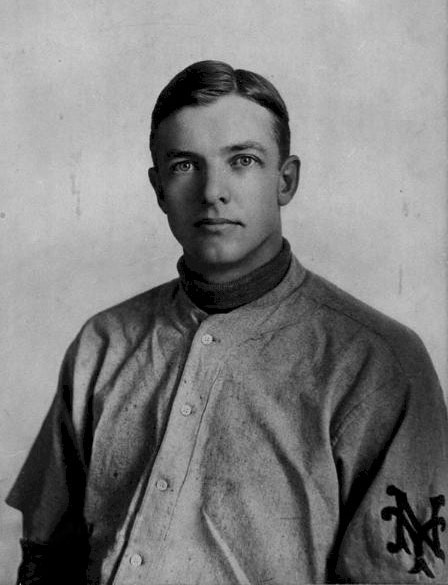
Christy Mathewson

On 3 November 1911, during the Xinhai Revolution that would lead to the collapse of the Qing dynasty in February 1912, an armed rebellion began in Shanghai, which resulted in the capture of the city on 8 November 1911, and the establishment of the Shanghai Military Government of the Republic of China, which was formally declared on 1 January 1912. Business proceeded for the Astor House Hotel, where rooms were available from $6 to $10 per night. However, the effects of the Revolution and the long absence of Gerrard resulted in a three-month operating loss of $60,000. On 30 June 1912, a "serious crisis" confronted the shareholders of the Astor House Hotel Company. While praise for the renovations was almost universal, they strained severely the Hotel's finances. The Hotel's bank refused to issue the funds needed to pay interest to the debenture holders, forcing an extraordinary meeting with the trustees of the note holders. The interest was finally paid after mortgaging the Astor Garden (B.C. Lot 1744), the foreshore property between Whangpoo Road and the Suchow Creek, for 25,000 taels (US$33,333.33).

On 11 December 1913, the Astor House Hotel hosted a banquet for both the New York Giants of John McGraw and Chicago White Stockings of Charles Comiskey baseball teams, which included Christy Mathewson and Olympian Jim Thorpe, who were touring the world playing exhibition games. This transnational tour was led by Albert Goodwill Spalding, owner of the White Stockings, "professional baseball's most influential figure." At that time, "No hotel in Shanghai, and few in the world, surpassed the Astor House Hotel. A handsome and impressive stone edifice of arched windows and balconies, the hotel stood six stories high and sprawled over three acres of land near the heart of the city. On 29 December 1913 the first sound film in China was shown at the Hotel. At this time there were still restrictions on Chinese entering the Astor House Hotel.

At the annual meeting of the Astor House Hotel Company held at the hotel in October 1913, the directors revealed plans to increase profit by another reconstruction, including the construction of a new theatre seating 1,200 people to replace Astor Hall, which seated only 300; additional luxury suites; and also a winter garden.

Mary Hall, who stayed at the Astor House in April 1914, described her experience:

The Astor House, which since I was here last, seventeen years ago, had outgrown all recognition....I entered the spacious social hall flanked with cigar, sweets, scent and other stalls....[I]nside the hotel it was easy to imagine ones self in London or New York. The idea is soon dissipated when you find yourself following a man clad in bath-room slippers and shirt to the feet, the whiteness of which is relieved by a long black pigtail hanging down his back. He bows and smiles as he unlocks a door and shows you to your room, which is light and airy, with a bath-room attached. The dining-room was a gorgeous scene in the evening...The room is long, and the prevailing colours buff and white: down the centre are very handsome Chinese inlaid pillars on which, during the hot months, electric fans are worked. A gallery runs down either side, and in the busy season is also filled with tables. A band plays nightly....'Boys' moved hither and thither dressed in long blue shirts over which were worn short white sleeveless jackets, the latter obviously full dress, as they were dispensed with at breakfast or tiffin. Soft black shoes over white stockings, and legs swathed with dark felt were the finishing touches of a picturesque uniform.

During 1914, the Astor Gardens, the portion of the hotel grounds at the front of the Hotel known as "the foreshore" that had stretched to the Suzhou Creek, was sold to allow the construction of the consulate of the Empire of Russia immediately in front of the Hotel. By October 1914, the Hotel's financial position had improved sufficiently to allow the shareholders to approve the renovation plans, which included demolishing the old dining room and kitchen to create eight shops that could be leased, and first class bedrooms and small apartments; construction of a new dining room in the centre of the hotel; relocation of the kitchen on the top floor to allow the conversion to bachelor's bedrooms; and conversion of part of the bar and billiard room into a grill room.

Despite the renovations, financial difficulties persisted that resulted in the trustees for the debenture holders foreclosing on the Hotel in August 1915. In September 1915, the trustees subsequently sold the Astor House Hotel Company Limited and all of its property and assets, including over 10 mow of land, to Central Stores Limited, owners of the Palace Hotel, for 705,000 taels. With the change of ownership, Gerrard's services were no longer required.

== Central Stores Ltd. (1915–1917) and The Shanghai Hotels Limited (1917–1923) ==
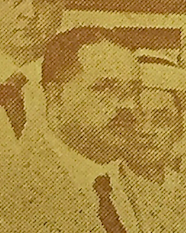
Edward Isaac Ezra

Central Stores Ltd. (renamed The Shanghai Hotels Limited in 1917) was owned 80% by Edward Isaac Ezra (born 3 January 1882 in Shanghai; died 16 December 1921 in Shanghai), the managing director of Shanghai Hotels Ltd., the largest stockholder, and its major financier, At one time, Ezra was "one of the wealthiest foreigners in Shanghai". According to one report, Ezra amassed a vast fortune estimated at from twenty to thirty million dollars primarily through the importation of opium and successful real estate investment and management in early twentieth century Shanghai. The Kadoorie family, Iraqi Sephardic Jews from India, who also owned the Palace Hotel at number 19 The Bund, on the corner with Nanjing Road, had a minority share holding in the Astor House Hotel.

=== Captain Harry Morton (1915–1920) ===
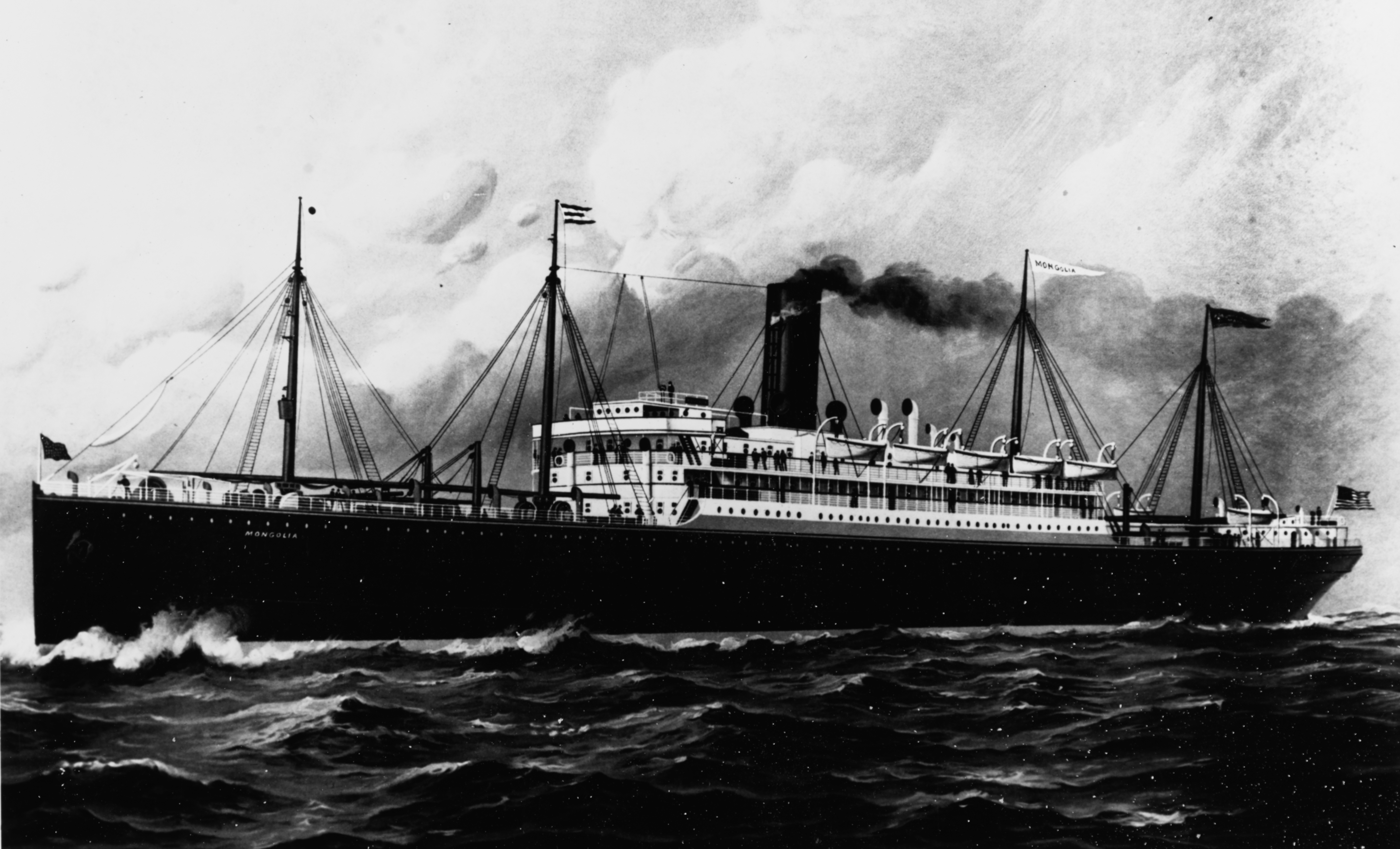
SS Mongolia, formerly captained by H.E. Morton

Despite some shareholder opposition, in March 1915, Captain Henry "Harry" Elrington Morton (born 12 May 1869 in Clonmel, Ireland; died 2 October 1923 in Manila) a "staunch Britisher" who had become a naturalised American citizen, a master mariner who had first gone to sea at age 14, formerly of the Royal Navy, a Royal Arch freemason, who "had been coming to Shanghai for twenty years", was appointed managing director, with responsibility for managing Central Stores' three Shanghai hotels, including the Astor House, with a salary of $900 a month, plus board and lodging. Morton was "a retired ship captain who ran it as a ship, the hotel had corridors painted with portholes and trompe-l'œil seascapes and rooms decorated like cabins; there was even a "steerage" section with bunks instead of beds at cheaper rates." American journalist John B. Powell, who first arrived in Shanghai in 1917 to work for Thomas Franklin Fairfax Millard, the founder of what later became The China Weekly Review, described his new accommodation at the Astor House Hotel: "the Astor House in Shanghai consisted of old three- and four-story brick residences extending around the four sides of a city block and linked together by long corridors. In the center of the compound was a courtyard where an orchestra played in the evenings. Practically everyone dressed for dinner, which never was served before eight o'clock. According to Powell, "Since most of the managers of the Astor House had been sea captains, the hotel had taken on many of the characteristics of a ship." While at that time the Hotel charged about $10 a day Mexican for accommodation, "a room in the "steerage" ... [cost] $125 a month, including meals and afternoon tea. That figured out at about $60 in United States currency." According to Powell,

the "steerage" section ... consisted of single rooms and small suites at the back of the hotel. The section resembled an American club, because practically all of the rooms and suites were occupied by young Americans who had come out to join the consulate, commercial attaché's office, or business firms whose activities were undergoing rapid expansion. Sanitary arrangements left much to be desired. There was no modern plumbing. The bathtub consisted of a large earthenware pot about four feet high and four feet in diameter....The Chinese servant assigned to me would carry in a seemingly endless number of buckets of hot water to fill the tub in the morning.

In 1915, soon after taking control of the Astor House Hotel, Ezra decided to add a new ballroom. The new ballroom, designed by Lafuente & Wooten, was opened in November 1917.

In July 1917, the assistant manager was Mr. Goodrich. Around the end of World War I, the Sixty Club, a group of sixty men-around-town (a mixture of actors and socialites), and their dates would meet at the Astor House each Saturday night. Shanghai was considered the "Paradise of Adventurers", and the "ornate but old-fashioned lobby" of the Astor House was considered its hub. The lobby was furnished with the heavy mahogany chairs and coffee tables. By 1918 the lobby of the Astor House, "that amusing whispering gallery of Shanghai", was "where most business is done" in Shanghai. After China signed the International Arms Embargo Agreement of 1919, "sinister-looking German, American, British, French, Italian, and Swiss arms dealers appeared in the lobby of the Astor House ... to dangle fat catalogs of their wares before the eager eyes of any buyers." In 1920, the lobby "with its convivial atmosphere, presents to the visitor a welcome oasis, where congregate travelers from afar to chat pleasantly." Another recorded: "The effervescence at the Astor is more tangy than elsewhere. All the latest scandal of the town is an old story in its lobbies almost before it occurs." Powell added: "At one time or another one saw most of the leading residents of the port at dinner parties or in the lobby of the Astor House. An old resident of Shanghai once told me, "If you sit in the lobby of the Astor House and keep your eyes open you will see all of the crooks who hang out on the China coast." According to Ron Gluckman, "Opium was commonplace, says one woman who lived in Shanghai before World War II. 'It was just what you had, after dinner, like dessert.' Opium and heroin were available via room service at some of the old hotels like the Cathay and Astor, which offered drugs, girls, boys, whatever you wanted."

In 1919, Zhou Xiang (周祥), "an Astor House bellboy, rewarded for recovering a Russian guest's wallet with its contents, spent a third of it on a car. That car became Shanghai's first taxi, and spawned the Johnson fleet, now known as the Qiangsheng taxi", which is "now ranked number-two by the number of taxis in the city behind Dazhong. The Shanghai government took over Qiangsheng after the Communists won the Chinese civil war in 1949".

Despite an annual profit of $596,437 in the previous year, in April 1920, Morton was forced to resign as the manager of the Shanghai Hotels Companies, Ltd, due to a new British government Order in Council restricting management of British companies to British subjects. Morton subsequently left Shanghai in May 1920 on board the steamer Ecuador.

=== Walter Sharp Bardarson (1920–1923) ===
Morton was replaced by Canadian Walter Sharp Bardarson (born 20 September 1877 in Roikoyerg, Iceland); died 17 October 1944 in Alameda, California). who became an American citizen after he resigned from the Astor House Hotel in June 1923. A 1920 travel guide summarised the features of the Astor House: "Astor House Hotel 250 rooms all with attached baths, the most commodious ballroom in Shanghai, renowned for its lobby, special dinner-parties, and balls. Banquets a special feature, and a French chef employed. Up-to-date hairdressing salon and beauty parlor. Strictly under foreign supervision."

Under the leadership of Edward Ezra, the Astor House Hotel made a handsome profit. Ezra, intended to build "the biggest and best hotel in the Far East, a 14-storey hotel with 650 huge luxury bedrooms, including a 1,500-seat dining hall and two dining rooms", on Bubbling Well Road. Tragically, Ezra died on Thursday, 16 December 1921. In 1922, Sir Ellis Kadoorie, one of the prominent members of the board of the Hong Kong Hotel Company, died aged 57, thus curtailing their expansion plans.

On 12 May 1922, Ezra's 80% controlling interest in The Shanghai Hotels Limited was purchased for 2.5 million Mexican dollars by Hongkong Hotels Limited, "Asia's oldest hotel company", which already owned the Hongkong Hotel, as well as the Peak, Repulse Bay, and Peninsular Hotels in Kowloon; Messrs. William Powells Ltd., a large department store in Hong Kong; the Hong Kong Steam Laundry; and three large parking garages in Hong Kong.

== Hong Kong & Shanghai Hotels, Limited (1923–1954) ==
=== James Harper Taggart ===
Astor House Hotel Baggage Label 1920s

On 12 May 1922 Ezra's 80% controlling interest in The Shanghai Hotels Limited was purchased for 2.5 million Mexican dollars by Hongkong Hotels Limited, "Asia's oldest hotel company", which already owned the Hongkong Hotel, as well as the Peak, Repulse Bay, and Peninsula Hotels in Kowloon; Messrs. William Powells Ltd., a large department store in Hong Kong; the Hong Kong Steam Laundry; and three large parking garages in Hong Kong. Shanghai Hotels Limited, which was managed by Mr. E. Burrows, owned the Astor House Hotel, Kalee Hotel, Palace and Majestic Hotels in Shanghai and approximately 60% of The Grand Hotel des Wagons-Lits in Beijing; the China Press; and China Motors Ltd., which owned parking garages. The architect of the acquisition was James Harper Taggart (born 1885 in Castlemaine, Victoria, Australia) managing director of Hongkong Hotels Limited, who was of "Lowland Scot heritage, of evidently very humble parentage", who was married to "an American millionaire heiress", was described as "dynamic", and as "diminutive and sharp-minded". and who had been the former manager of the Hong Kong Hotel. Initially both Burrows and Taggart were joint managing directors of the new entity. In October 1923 Taggart helped engineer the merger of Shanghai Hotels Limited and the Hongkong Hotel Company, to create Hong Kong & Shanghai Hotels, Limited with himself as managing director.

Despite indicating in May 1922 that Ezra and Kadoorie's planned new "super hotel" to be built at Bubbling Well Road would proceed, later Taggart decided to cancel the project, instead decided to create "new rendezvous and entertainment centres of Shanghai's social and business circles." Taggart "played a leading role in revolutionising the modern hotel business in Shanghai by introducing novel concepts, such as dinner dances and European-style grill rooms." After the first radio broadcast in China on 26 January 1922, the Astor House Hotel was among the first to install a receiving set to hear the inaugural broadcast, locating it in the Grill room. Another innovation was The Yellow Lantern, an exotic and exclusive curio shop, located off the lobby shop, operated by Jack and Hetty Mason, where rare Oriental treasures, including embroideries, were offered for sale. By the early 1920s, the Astor House Hotel had become "an international institution in fame and reputation." The Shanghai Rotary Club (Club 545), which was formed in July 1919, began meeting at 12.30pm each Thursday at the Astor House Hotel for tiffins in 1921, and again for five years from 1926. The Shanghai Stock Exchange was housed at the Astor House Hotel from 1920 until 1949. According to Peter Hibbard,

The "Roaring Twenties" saw Shanghai entering a period of frenetic growth, only tamed in the late 1930s, with the old fabric of the city being torn apart in a rapacious drive towards modernisation. The city was staking its claim as a great international city, with a modern skyline and manners to match. Apart from its rapidly growing foreign population with their ever-increasing demands for sophisticated entertainment, the number of foreign visitors began to boom in the early 1920s. The first of a long stream of round-the-world cruise-liners began to call on the city in 1921 and by the early 1930s, Shanghai was playing host to around 40,000 globetrotters each year.

The influx of White Russian refugees from Vladivostok after the fall of the Provisional Priamurye Government in Siberia in October 1922 at the close of the Russian Civil War, created a significant community of Shanghai Russians. Denied the benefits of extraterritoriality, and having few other resources, there was a proliferation of white slavery, brothels and street prostitution, and new nightspots on Bubbling Well Road and Avenue Edward VII also reduced patronage at the more sedate tea dances at the Astor House: "For foreigners, the better cabarets offered a welcome alternative to club life and the stuffy tea dances at the Astor House Hotel ... around which the foreign colony's social life had previously revolved."

=== Renovations (1923) ===
By the beginning of 1923, there were those who felt the Astor House Hotel needed improvement. Further, while "The Astor House on Whangpoo Road, with its palm garden and its French chef, was the largest and best place to stay," the opening of the Majestic Hotel in 1924 eclipsed the Astor House once again. One guest who attended a New Year's Eve event in 1922 indicated: "We hied to the Astor House, a place far removed in space and comfort from its namesake in New York city." Additionally, the large public spaces created in the previous renovations were not proving profitable.

The owners began remodelling the hotel again in 1923 to "keep up with the Shanghai passion for nightly entertainment." The ground floor was remodelled, and "its grill-room soon earned distinction." They commissioned architect Mr. A. Lafuente to design the dining room and ballroom. On Saturday, 22 December 1923, the new ballroom was opened formally with 350 invited guests. The North-China Herald described the ballroom:

The light blue walls decorated with maidens and sylphs dancing in the open spaces, are surmounted by the plaster reliefs for the indirect lighting system suspended from the ceiling, while high on the marble pillars beautifully cast female figures appear to support the roof. Probably the most novel feature of the decorative scheme, excepting the incandescent mirrors was the peacock shell utilized by the orchestra.

The initial Astor House orchestra had eight members under the direction of "Whitey" Smith. Later the resident Astor Orchestra was directed by Alex Bershadsky, a White Russian émigré, while the orchestra of Ben Williams, the first American orchestra to travel to Shanghai, also played at the Astor House.

=== Jacques Kiass (1924–1928) ===
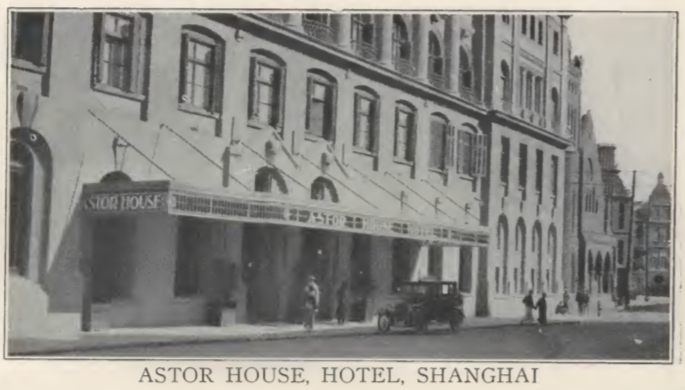
Astor House Hotel, Shanghai, 1925

By April 1924 the manager was Jacques Kiass. In 1924 the American aviators who made the first aerial circumnavigation of the world, indicated: "Upon entering the lobby, had it not been for the Chinese attendants, we should have thought ourselves in a hotel in New York, Paris, or London." During the First Jiangsu-Zhejiang War, conflict between the armies of General Sun Chuanfang, warlord of Fujian, and rival warlord General Lu Yongxiang of Zhejiang, an evening fire caused damage at the Astor House Hotel on 17 October 1924, and forced the evacuation of guests and hundreds of Chinese servants. Isabel Peake Duke recalled being at a tea dance at the Astor during an earthquake in 1926, during which "the walls of the hotel were visibly shaking and swaying". At this time the tea dances were held daily (except Sundays) between 5 pm and 7 pm. Duke indicates that for the price of one Mexican dollar (about 35 US cents), the Paul Whiteman Orchestra played the romantic dance tunes of the period, and included sandwiches, cream and cakes. Her only complaint was the lack of air-conditioning, necessitating overhead ceiling fans and fountains of water to keep the dancers cool in the summer months. According to Frederic E. Wakeman, "The tea dance was one of the first cultural events to bring the Chinese and Western elites of Shanghai together. High society initially met at the Astor." At one time Chinese visitors were not allowed into the lobby or the elevator. However, by now, "smartly dressed Chinese youngsters, Shanghai's jeunesse dorte, enjoyed the tea dance at the Astor House." These afternoon tea dances at the Majestic Hotel and the Astor House became "the first places where 'polite' foreign and Chinese society met. At both venues, more whiskey than tea was served. These 'teas' dragged on late into the evening, with drunken guests occasionally falling into the magnificent fountain that occupied the center of its clover-shaped Winter Garden ballroom." Elise McCormick indicated in 1928, "Tea dances at the Astor House formerly took place only once a week. Later the demand caused them to be introduced twice a week and soon they were taking place every day except Saturday and Sunday, with a dinner dance in the ballroom practically every night."

On 21 March 1927, during a battle between the Kuomintang and the Communist forces during the Chinese Civil War, the Astor House Hotel was struck by bullets. In 1927 the Astor House Hotel in Shanghai was included in Robert Ludy's Historic Hotels of the World, where it was indicated that "the Astor House Hotel...has been the principal hostelry for more than fifty years." Ludy further indicates that the Hotel was one of the three hotels in Shanghai where all the important foreign visitors to Shanghai stay, and that "it is not only possible to enjoy modern conveniences in these Chinese hotels, but they are quite as well equipped as those found in America or Europe." In 1929 the officers of the Royal Army Medical Corps were impressed with the standard of accommodation: "The rooms at the Astor House Hotel are very comfortable, central heating, bathroom attached, hot and cold water ad lib. The hotel charges were $12 a day, about 25 s[hillings]., inclusive of food and everything, but you have to have your meals in the big dining room."

=== H.O. Wasser (1928) ===
By November 1928 the manager was H.O. "Henry" Wasser. Another valuable employee was Mr Kammerling, a Russian Jew (born in Turkey) who became Reception Clerk: "With an amazing flair for languages and the opportunity to work with people of many cultures, Mr H. Kammerling eventually learned to converse fluently and faultlessly in German, English, French, Chinese, Hebrew, Japanese and one or two other languages, as well as his native Russian and Turkish." By 1930, Kammerling was one of the Hotel's managers.

=== Decline in prestige (1930–1932) ===
Despite the 1923 renovations, by 1930 the Astor House Hotel was no longer the pre-eminent hotel in Shanghai. The completion of the Cathay Hotel in 1929, "threw a painful shadow upon the old-fashioned Astor House." According to Gifford, "The center of social activity shifted in the 1930s from the Astor House around the corner to the Cathay. Its jazz was even more jumping, its rooms were even more Art Deco a-go-go." In 1912, when the American Consulate was constructed on Huangpu Road, and just after the re-opening of the Astor House after extensive renovations, the Hongkou area was considered "a most desirable location", however by 1932 the area had deteriorated, due in part to the proliferation of Japanese businesses and residents, with many Chinese refusing to cross into the Hongkou district. In April 1932 The China Weekly Review indicated that the Hotel "incidentally had slumped into a second rate establishment due to the construction of newer and more modern hotels south of the [Suzhou] creek." Further, Fortune magazine in describing the Cathay Hotel highlighted the problem for the Astor House: "Its air-conditioned ballrooms have emptied all the older ballrooms in town. And the comfort of its tower bedrooms has brought wrinkles to the foreheads of the managers of the old Astor House and the Palace Hotel." While the Astor House was less expensive than the Cathay Hotel, it also lacked air-conditioning. American historian William Reynolds Braisted recalling that on his return to Shanghai in 1932, after an absence of a decade:

The Palace Hotel and the Astor House were now far outclassed by three hotels built by a wealthy Baghdadi Jew, Sir Victor Sassoon: the magnificent Cathay Hotel on the Bund, the Metropole in midtown, and the Cathay Mansions across the road from the Cercle Français in the French Concession.

James Lafayette Hutchison, on his return to the Astor House in the 1930s after several years absence in the United States, noticed no changes: "I walked across the bridge and registered at the old Astor House Hotel.... The same subdued, cavernous lobby with the same white-gowned boys leaning against the tall pillars, the same mystic maze of halls leading to a sparsely furnished bedroom." Further, he described the Astor House as "a faded green, cavern-like wooden structure, with tall rooms smelling of must and mildew". According to Canadian journalist Gordon Sinclair, by 1931 the Shanghai Press Club used the Astor as their regular meeting place, and overseas Chinese frequently stayed there.

=== 28 January incident (1932) ===
In response to the Mukden Incident, and the subsequent beating of five Japanese Buddhist monks in Shanghai by Chinese civilians on 18 January 1932, and despite offers of compensation by the Shanghai municipal government, Japanese forces attacked Shanghai in the January 28 incident. A good deal of fighting took place near the Astor House Hotel. Reports to the United States Department of State indicated: "Chinese shells once more fell in neighborhood of wharf area of Hongkew. The shells were clearly heard passing between British Consulate and Astor House." On 30 January 1932, during the Japanese invasion of Shanghai, a reporter for The New York Times, reported on the impact of the Shanghai Incident on the Astor House Hotel:

At 11:30 o'clock this morning the Japanese inexplicably began firing machine guns down Broadway past the Astor House Hotel....The streets were then filled with milling masses of frightened, homeless Chinese, some of them wearily sitting on bundles of household goods. Immediately there was the wildest panic. . . . Chinese women with their bound feet and with babies in their arms were attempting to run to safety as their faces streamed in tears.

On 30 January 1932 the Japanese "effected the seizure and military occupation of virtually all parts of the International Settlement eastward of and down the river from Suzhou Creek, which area includes the postoffice, the Astor House Hotel, the buildings of the Japanese, German and Russian consulates and the city's main wharves and docks." The fighting and shelling in the vicinity of the Astor House Hotel "resulted in consternation among the guests", but the arrival of four American naval vessels on 1 February 1932 partially alleviated their concerns. On 25 February 1932, American Consul-General Cunningham ordered all Americans staying at the Astor House to evacuate due to fears of the artillery of the counter-attacking Chinese forces. However, despite "many Chinese shells" falling in the vicinity of the Astor House that night, the American guests refused initially to evacuate the Hotel, but by 30 April "many guests moved out of the Astor House hotel", along with most non-Japanese residents of the Hongkou district.

=== Arrest of Ken Wang (1932) ===
On 27 February 1932 Japanese sailors pursued Chinese Brigadier General Ken Wang (Wang Keng or Wang Kang) (born 1895), then a recent West Point graduate, whom they believed to be a spy, into the lobby of the Astor House Hotel and arrested him, in violation of the international law that operated in the International Settlement, without explanation or apologies, and refused to turn him over to the police of the International Settlement. After a strike of Astor House employees, and a scare caused by a "convivial guest" throwing an empty bottle out of one of the Hotel's windows at midnight, eventually Wang was released but detained by the Nanjing government, which was forced to deny three weeks later that Wang had been executed for treason.

=== Highlights (1932–1937) ===
By 1934 "the Astor House Hotel's tea dances and classical concerts [were] popular...during the Winter season." In 1934 the Astor House's tariffs were, in Mexican dollars (approximately 1/3 of an American dollar): "single, $12; double, $20; suite- for two, $30." One of the more interesting frequent visitors to the Astor House Hotel was Mr. Mills, a gibbon, who accompanied American journalist Emily Hahn, the sometime paramour of Sir Victor Sassoon, from 1935 until her departure for Hong Kong in 1941. In 1936 American artist Bertha Boynton Lum (1869–1954) was enthusiastic in her description of the Astor House Hotel: "The rooms are huge, the ceilings unbelievably high, and the baths large enough to drown" in. American Charles H. Baker, Jr., in his 1939 travelogue The Gentleman's Companion, describes the drink that caused him to miss many steamships as "a certain cognac and absinthe concoction known as The Astor House Special, native to Shanghai". According to Baker, the ingredients for the Astor House Special are: "1½ oz cognac, 1 tsp maraschino liqueur, 2 tsp egg white, ¾ oz Pernod, ½ tsp lemon juice, and club soda", however "the original recipe calls for Absinthe instead of Pernod."

=== Second Sino-Japanese War (1937–1945) ===
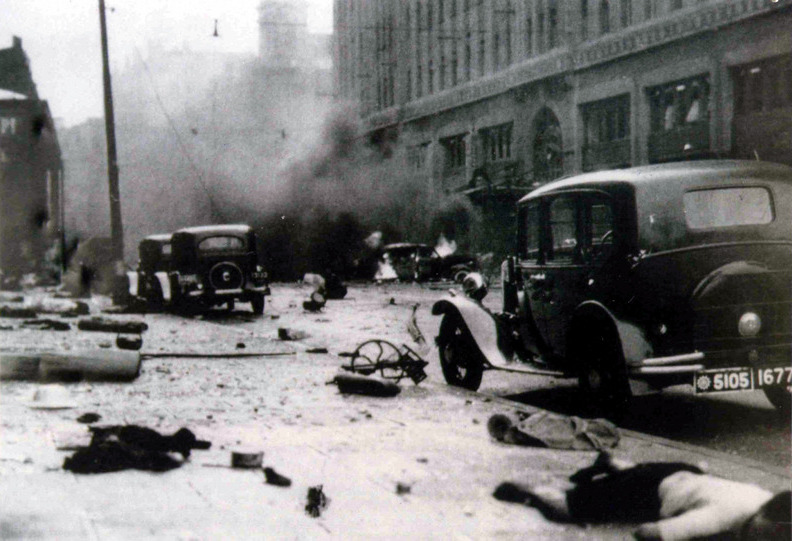
Effects of Chinese Bomb dropped near Cathay Hotel 14 August 1937

The Hotel was damaged during the Battle of Shanghai when the Japanese invaded Shanghai in August 1937 at the outset of the Second Sino-Japanese War. After Japanese machine guns were set up outside the hotel, and Japanese troops searched the Astor House for an American photographer, Americans living there evacuated on 14 August, with one, Dr. Robert K. Reischauer, subsequently killed later that day in the lobby of the Cathay Hotel by a bomb dropped from a Chinese war plane. Subsequently Japanese troops seized the Astor House Hotel, but by 18 August, the Hotel management recaptured the Astor House. In the following days, some 18,000 to 20,000 Europeans, Americans and Japanese evacuated to Hong Kong, Manila, and Japan, including Lawrence and Horace Kadoorie, who fled to Hong Kong. The Hotel was damaged again on 14 October 1937 by bombs from planes of the Chinese government and shells from Japanese naval guns. On 4 November 1937 a Chinese torpedo boat launched a torpedo in an attempt to sink the Japanese cruiser Izumo, then "lying moored to the Nippon Yusen Kaisha wharf close to the Japanese Consulate General, just east of the mouth of Soochow Creek", near to the Garden Bridge, exploded outside the Astor House breaking several windows. American foreign correspondent Irene Corbally Kuhn, one of the writers of the 1932 film, The Mask of Fu Manchu, and then a reporter for The China Press, described the hotel as "the most famous inn on the China coast, redundantly identified as the Astor House Hotel," and also the damage inflicted upon it during the 1937 Japanese invasion: "from the street the boards were up over the shop fronts." On 23 November 1937, it was reported that "The Japanese at present have the Astor House Hotel filled with socalled Chinese traitors".

The vacuum created when the British owners of the Astor House Hotel fled to Hong Kong in September 1937 allowed the Japanese occupation forces to assume control of the hotel until the surrender of the Empire of Japan on 2 September 1945. The Astor House Hotel was occupied by the Japanese YMCA for two years, until 1939. The Japanese subsequently leased the hotel for a three-year term to another party, with "a reasonable return" remitted to the absent owners. On 6 November 1938 four hundred members of the White Russian diaspora in Shanghai met at the Astor House Hotel (across the road from the Soviet embassy) to discuss forming an anti-communism alliance with the Axis powers: Japan, Italy and Germany against Soviet Union.

In July 1940 Time magazine reported that, in response to the unapproved anti-Japanese thrice daily broadcasts on radio station XMHA (600 kHz AM) of "burly, tousled, tough-tongued, 39-year-old" veteran American journalist Carroll Duard Alcott (1901–1965), "The embittered Japanese began operating a maverick transmitter from Shanghai's Astor House Hotel, which set up a terrible clatter whenever Alcott began to broadcast. Alcott told about it. The Japanese denied it. Alcott told the number of the hotel room where it was housed. Finally the Japanese turned their transmitter over to some Shanghai Nazis." The jamming continued by the Japanese from the top floor of the Astor House. Alcott, who had worn a bullet-proof vest, had two bodyguards, and carried a .45 automatic after threats to him by Japanese authorities, was ordered to leave China by the Japanese-sponsored government of Wang Ching-wei in July 1940, refused to quit his broadcasts, but eventually departed Shanghai on 14 September 1941 on board the President Harrison, after four years of broadcasts.

During the Japanese occupation the Astor House was also used to house prominent British (and later American) nationals captured by the Japanese., Later the Astor House Hotel was used as the Japanese General headquarters, before being leased as a hotel for the duration of the war. In late June 1944 the Japanese held "an elaborate ceremony at the Astor House Hotel in which the titles of six public utilities in Shanghai, including electricity, gas, waterworks, telephone, telegraph and tram service were transferred to the Nanjing Government."

== Post-War era (1945–1959) ==
During World War II and the Japanese occupation, "the Astor House fell into decline, and its elegance was soon no more than an almost unimaginable memory." Hibbard indicates "the hotel fared badly in the war and extensive refurbishment bills were deferred following its requisition by the US Army", in September 1945. The Hong Kong and Shanghai Hotels Ltd (HKSH) leased the hotel to the US Army until June 1946. According to Horst Eisfelder, a German Jewish refugee from Nazi Germany, lunch at the Astor House during the American army occupancy was a real treat: "For only US 5¢ we had freshly prepared pancakes and a bottle of icy cold Coca Cola, which also cost five cents".

By 1946 White Russian refugee Len Tarasov had become manager of the Astor House Hotel, but was fired when a Chinese businessman leased the Hotel from the Hong Kong and Shanghai Hotels Ltd (HKSH) in 1947. Its address was listed as 2 Ta Ming Road, Shanghai. The Chinese management subdivided the first floor to create 23 rooms, and rebuilt the shops on street level, opened a cafe, and re—opened the bar. The hotel was "filled with members of organisations involved in the post-war reconstruction of China, including the United Nations Relief and Rehabilitation Association". On 27 May 1949, the People's Liberation Army marched into Shanghai, and on 1 October 1949 the People's Republic of China was proclaimed, forcing Generalissimo Chiang Kai-shek to flee. According to some accounts, Chiang had his last dinner in mainland China at the Astor House on 10 December 1949, before flying into exile on the island of Taiwan. By 1950 the agreement between the Hong Kong and Shanghai Hotels Ltd and the Chinese company expired. While the HKSH wanted to resume management of the hotel, the Chinese company was reluctant to relinquish control. Diplomatic tensions between the new Chinese government and the United Kingdom further complicated the dispute.

The fortunes of the Astor House fell into a spiral of decline, and its liveried doormen, elegantly appointed rooms and French restaurant with palm garden were soon no more than a distant and almost unimaginable memory."

On 19 April 1954 the Hotel was confiscated and control of the hotel passed to the Land and House Bureau of the Shanghai people's government. On 25 June 1958 the hotel was incorporated into the Shanghai Institution Business Administrative bureau. Prior to the Hotel's re-opening as the Pujiang Hotel in 1959, "the building had been used by a tea and textile trading company as offices and dormitories, as well as by the Chinese Navy."

== Pujiang Hotel (1959–2018) ==
On 27 May 1959, the name was changed from the Astor House Hotel to the Pujiang Hotel, and the hotel was permitted to receive both foreigners and overseas Chinese guests. During the Cultural Revolution (1966–1976), the Hotel declined substantially, with the dining room on the top floor being changed beyond all recognition. In 1988 the Pujiang Hotel was incorporated into another government-controlled entity, the Shanghai Hengshan Mountain Group (上海衡山集团).

During this period, the Hotel became the first hotel in China to offer hostel beds.

In the late 1980s, the hotel's reputation declined, and it functioned partly as a "backpackers hangout." At the end of 1992, the then Pujiang Hotel was described negatively. The Hotel "became the city's premiere destination for independent travellers seeking dormitory accommodation." One 1983 guide described the Hotel as "slightly run-down", while a 1986 guide warned: "Despite its exceptional location near the Bund, ... the Pujiang is recommended only to travelers well prepared for 'roughing it'". Pamela Yatsko, who stayed at the Pujiang Hotel in 1986, described it as "a dilapidated western architectural relic catering to penny-pinching backpackers like myself, melted seamlessly into this somber skyline, making it barely distinguishable from a distance....As for the Astor House Hotel's spacious rooms, the renamed hotel rented me a cot in one that had been converted into a dorm room fitting probably 30 beds....The clerk charged me the equivalent of US$8 a night for the cot."

In 1988 the Pujiang Hotel was incorporated into another government-controlled entity, the Shanghai Hengshan Mountain Group (上海衡山集).

At that time, one assessment indicated: "Today the Pujiang is run down and can get cold and clammy in winter – otherwise its nice." At the end of 1989, the Pujiang was "Shanghai's official backpackers' hangout," with at least eight dormitories accommodating twenty people in each. Accommodation in "the cheap if austere dormitory rooms", was inexpensive. In 1989, a bed in the dormitories was 17 renminbi, including breakfast, while four years later it had only increased to 20 renminbi per night, while a private room was 80.

In 1998 the Pujiang became the first Shanghai member of the International Youth Hostel Federation. By 1998, "its 80 [private] rooms cost $40 to $60" per night. Prior to its restoration, the Pujiang Hotel seemed to have reached its nadir, being described as "an inexpensive, somewhat grotty backpackers' favorite" and "a dive for young budget travelers. Only the ballroom still shows signs of life." A 1999 foreign guest elaborates: "My room turned out to be located on a floor way up in the Gods that must have been the former servants' quarters. The lift and grand staircase ended at the fifth floor below it and from there you ascended a set of dark, steep stairs to the attic. I imagined the ghosts of weary maid-servants trudging up these stairs late at night.... The polished wooden boards creaked and shook when anyone walked, or thundered, down the passage past my door.... One drawback to living in the attic was that the bathroom I had to use was three flights of stairs down on the third floor. The bathroom, in an annexe off the side of the building, was a dingy old square room covered all over in white tiles and with drainage holes in the floor that made it look like a gas chamber. The floor sloped away a good four inches (10 cm) as though the annexe was sliding down the outer wall. It felt as though I was still on the ship. Ancient pipes ran down the walls to two antique taps that spouted a solid jet of water which, without the refinement of a shower rose, pelted you from an overhead pipe. A local reporter indicated: "Situated in an inconspicuous corner near the Bund, the Pujiang Hotel, formerly the Astor House Hotel, seems to have lost its bygone glory. The low-rise building has been eroded to be dated in colour, which was submerged among the eminent architecture of the Bund. Few members of the city's younger generation are even aware that the hotel exists, let alone that it is considered the father of the city's luxury hotels.

=== Renovations (2002–2008) ===
According to Mark O'Neill, in 1995 the Hotel faced destruction, as "much of the furniture and interior decoration was destroyed or stolen during the Cultural Revolution, while insects had eaten a large part of the wood. Some parties have proposed demolishing it and putting a modern, five-star hotel on the site. Hengshan established a committee of scholars and experts which concluded that the hotel should be saved." Once Wu Huaixiang (吴怀祥), president of the state-owned Hengshan Group, discovered its historical significance, he convinced the Group to retain the building and gradually restore it to its former glory. Wu explained the reasoning behind renovation rather than demolition: "If the hotel is demolished during my watch, I would be judged as a criminal in history. We could build a modern hotel anywhere but the Astor House is only in one place." The Shanghai Zhuzong Group Architectural and Interior Design Co. Ltd., which had also renovated the nearby Broadway Mansions, was chosen to undertake the renovation work. In 2002 the first phase of renovation was completed, and cost about 7 million renminbi to refurbish the 35 VIP rooms. Even after some initial renovation in 2002, it was apparent to a British reporter in 2004 that the Astor House required additional changes: "Now, a bit down on its luck, it had to make do with me and other budget travellers. Inside the atmosphere of faded decadence persisted. The "hairdressers" at the end of the corridor seemed a bit too keen to promote their "special room massage". The request for a haircut left them totally baffled, which could have explained Einstein's crazy hairdo in the portrait in the lobby." About this time the Hotel was again renamed the Astor House Hotel in English, while continuing to be the Pujiang Hotel in the Chinese.

In November 2003 Wu Huaixiang indicated the Hengshan Group was looking for an overseas investor to pay part of the 100 million yuan (US$12.5 million) needed to "renovate and manage the property and turn it into the Raffles of Shanghai." Wu indicated: "Our aim is to turn it into a classic five-star hotel, like the Raffles in Singapore. We want the investor to pay a leasing fee and provide some of the money for renovation. That we can negotiate." The Hong Kong and Shanghai Hotels Group, who had owned the Astor House until its confiscation in 1952, was uninterested in buying back Astor House, as it had plans to construct a Peninsular Hotel on the nearby site of the former British Consulate.

During the renovations several significant discoveries were made in 2004: "Seven century-old, white marble clapboards embossed with carvings of the Egyptian Sphinx were recently found in a hotel storage room that has been sealed for decades. The storage room at the Shanghai Astor House Hotel also contained several other century-old utensils, including an American hurricane lamp, an English ammeter, four blades of an American electric fan, and 37 white marble candle holders". According to Li Hao, a manager at the Hotel, "The antiques will first be appraised, then be repaired, and finally be put in their former places or exhibited to the public. ... We'll relocate them to where they were, providing them a chance to function again as before." Jasper Becker reported later in 2004, soon after the most recent renovation: "The oak-panelled walls and Ionic marble columns of the Astor Hotel's reception hall lend it a grandeur that war and revolution have not altered since Bertrand Russell and Bernard Shaw succumbed to Shanghai's splendid decadence.

In February 2006 the Shanghai Municipal Council announced plans for significant renovation in the area surrounding the Astor House Hotel. According to an article by Mark O'Neill, "When well-heeled visitors arrive in Shanghai in 2009 and want to stay in a period hotel on the Bund, they will be able to choose between two properties of the Kadoorie family. One will be the new Peninsula Hotel due for completion that year and the other the Pujiang, now state-owned but which belonged to the Kadoories before 1949 and is being refurbished in the style of the early 1900s. The properties are part of an ambitious multibillion-dollar project to turn the Bund from a street of rundown commercial buildings into a Chinese Ginza or Fifth Avenue, with upmarket hotels, restaurants, brand-name stores and expensive apartments. The city government wants to complete the transformation ahead of the World Expo in 2010, when it will show to the world what it has achieved in the 20 years since its resurrection began in 1990, after the decay and neglect during the first four decades of communist rule."

In May 2006 the Hotel was described: "From the outside, the hotel looks like Harrods; inside is a marble-floored reception dimly lit by a huge chandelier. The air of faded grandeur is enhanced by the fact that previous guests have included Einstein and Charlie Chaplin. Those boys may or may not have received friendlier service than we did, but the room size and decor more than made up for it." Frommer's travel guide described the refurbished Astor House Hotel: "The brick-enclosed inner courtyard on the third floor now leads to rooms that have been refurbished and stripped down to accentuate the building's original highlights (high ceilings, carved moldings, and wooden floors). Beds are firm and comfortable, bathrooms large and clean, and there are even little flourishes like old-fashioned dial telephones. In 2006 the Morning Shanghai restaurant opened at the Astor House: "On entering the building there is the vaulting red-brick ceiling, a European-style dome and impressive chandelier. The pillars in the lobby are replicas of the originals, and the antiques by the stairs recall times long past. Morning Shanghai's attention to the authenticity of its dishes and the general ambiance makes it suitable for those more advanced in years to enjoy the dining experience and reminisce."

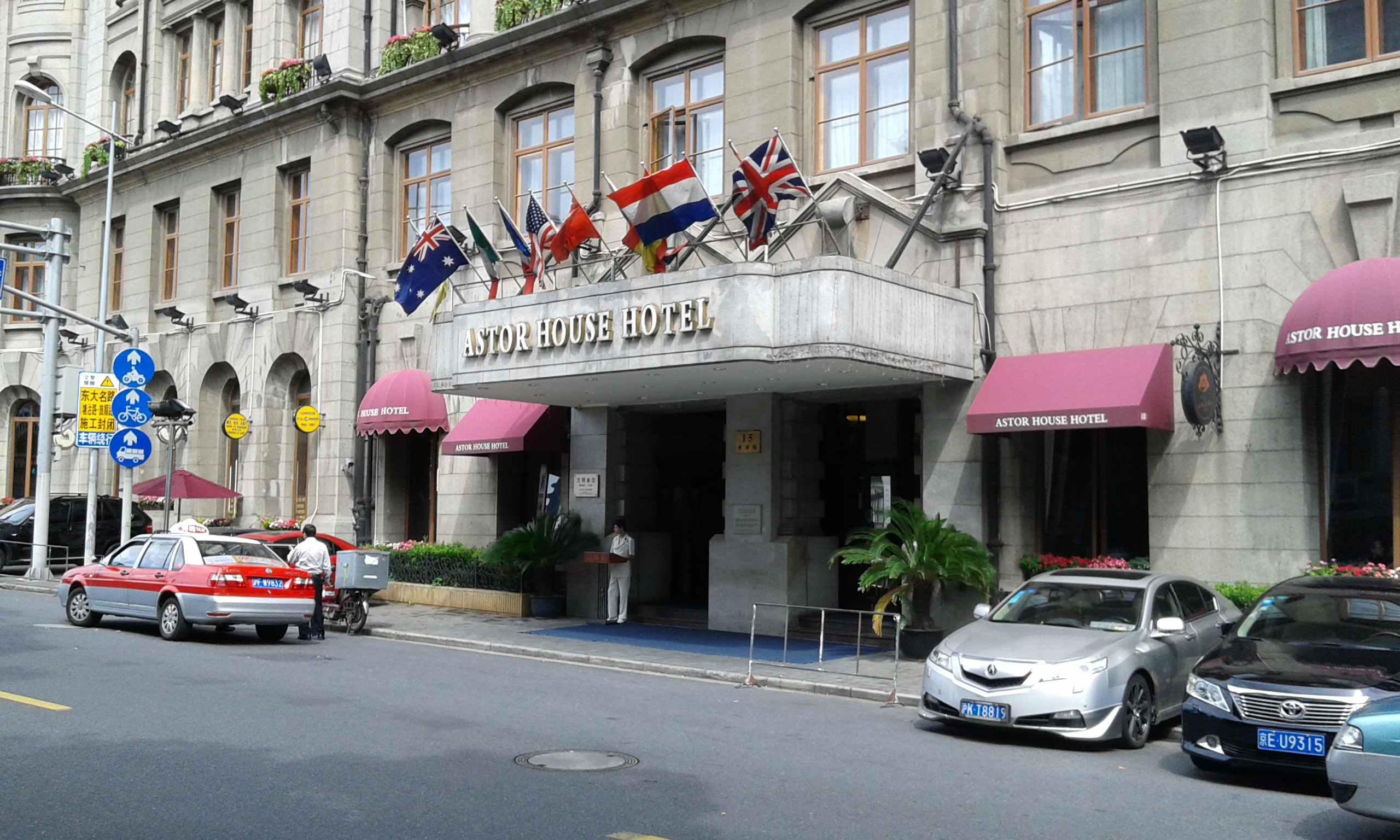
Astor House Hotel, Shanghai, 2014

As part of the extensive renovations in the vicinity of the Astor House Hotel in preparation for the 2010 World Expo held in Shanghai from May 2010, The Daily Telegraph predicted in February 2008: "Thirty of the buildings have protected status, while the renovation of the [Waibaidu] bridge will turn attention to the Astor House Hotel and Shanghai Mansions, Art Deco haunts of the city's pre-war glitterati....The Astor House Hotel is one of the city's neglected treasures and a fair bet will be that it will be restored to it former glory and the prices will zoom up to reflect this. A price worth paying for the Astor is part of the history of Shanghai."

According to Tourism Review magazine in late 2008: "In recent years through intensive restoration the hotel got a completely new look. Today, it is a unique combination of old Victorian-style design and modern facilities. It contains 116 various types of rooms, including deluxe, standard, and executive and some 4-bed rooms. Each room is well decorated while some of them in which celebrities once stayed, are taken as historic spots with photos hanging on the wall to show guests. Today there is "an eccentric style to the place. And how can you not love a hotel that makes its male staff dress in spats, kilts and black tailcoats?...With its thick lacquered walls, high ceilings, wooden floorboards and winding corridors, it has a feel that's somewhere between a Victorian asylum and an English boarding school". In July 2009, the Hotel was described as "the tactfully-refurbished Astor House."

== China Securities Museum (2018–present) ==
The hotel closed on 1 January 2018, after being purchased by an undisclosed local business. It was converted to the China Securities Museum, which opened in December 2018.

The Shanghai Stock Exchange opened at the hotel in 1920 and remained here until 1949 when it closed. It re-opened at the same location in 1990, using the ballroom of the west wing of the hotel until the exchange was relocated to Pudong in 1998; it ran in the west wing, while "the east wing of the building still functioned as a state-run hotel." The main aim of the Exchange was "to sell state securities, but a few other stocks (already being traded less formally) were also listed. The "transaction hall" was equipped with modern computers, several dozen small rooms for bargaining, and electronic transmission of prices "to 47 transaction centers around the city." Initially only eight stocks and 22 bonds were listed.

== References in popular culture ==
The Astor House Hotel has appeared in the following films:

- 2005 Everlasting Regret (Chinese: Changhen ge), produced by Jackie Chan, based on a novel by Wang Anyi, featured the Astor House's Restaurant;
- 2007 Lust, Caution (Chinese: Se, jie), a Chinese espionage thriller directed by Taiwanese American director Ang Lee, based on the 1979 short story by Chinese author Eileen Chang, had some scenes shot around the Astor House Hotel.
- 2008 Forever Enthralled (simplified Chinese: 梅兰芳; traditional Chinese: 梅蘭芳; pinyin: Méi Lánfāng), a biographical account of Mei Lanfang, China's greatest opera star, directed by Chen Kaige, filmed some of its scenes at the Astor House Hotel.
