= Broadway Mansions =

Coordinates: 31°14′40″N 121°29′10″E

- 百老汇大厦
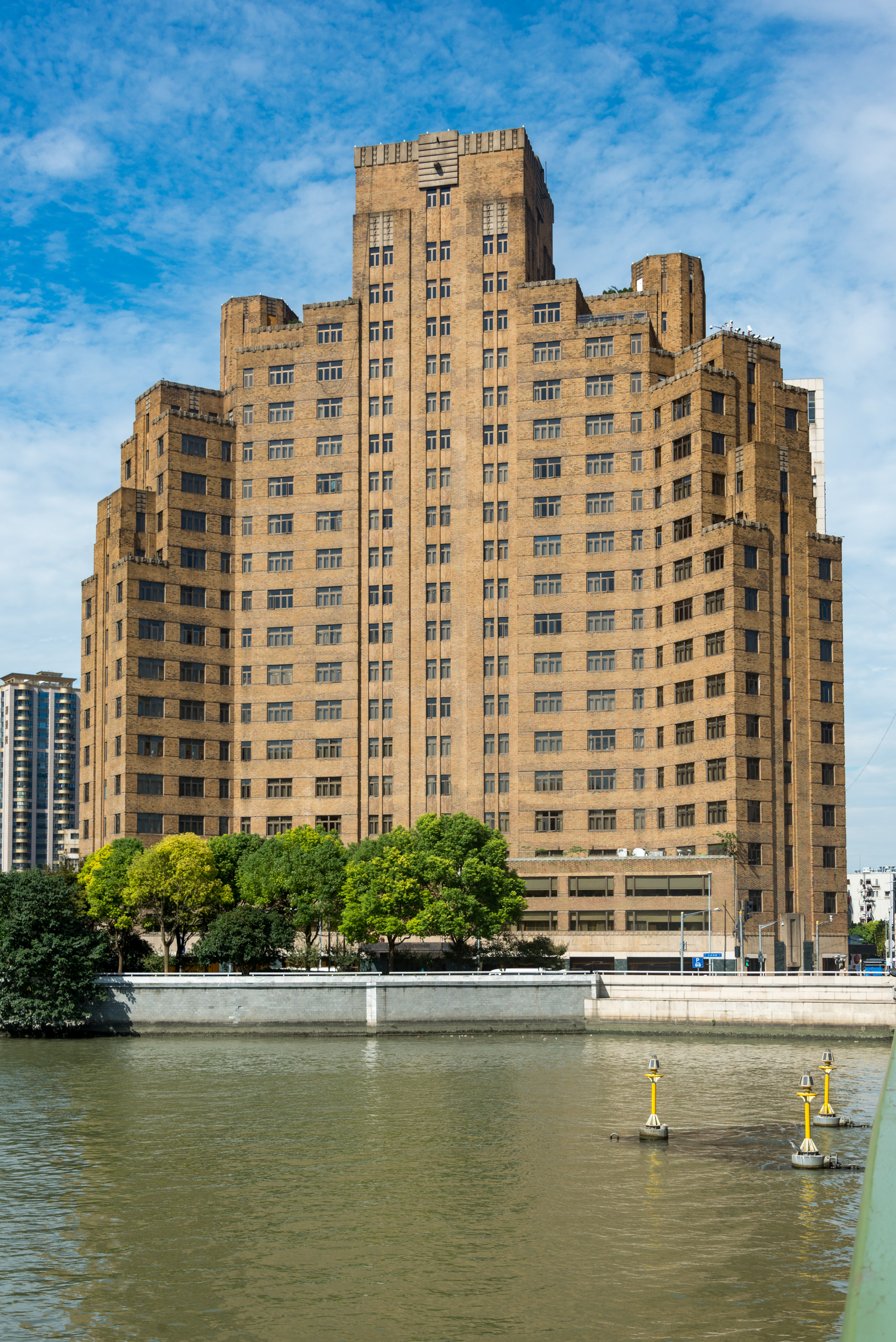
- Broadway Mansions, 2013
- Interactive map of the Broadway Mansions area

General information
- Status: Completed
- Type: Hotel, apartments
- Location: 20 Bei Suzhou Road, Hongkou District, Shanghai, China
- Construction started: 1930
- Completed: 1934
- Cost: $10 million (Mexican) (approximately US$3.4 million)
- Owner: Shanghai Hengshan (Group) Holdings Company (上海市人民政府直属的上海衡山集团) since at least 1985.

Height
- Roof: 78.0 m (255.9 ft)

Technical details
- Floor count: 19
- Floor area: 24,596 square meters (264,750 sq ft)

Design and construction
- Architects: B. Flazer, Palmer and Turner
- Developer: Shanghai Land Investment Company
- Structural engineer: John William Barrow, Palmer and Turner
- Main contractor: Ye Guang Estate Property Company

References
- broadwaymansions.com

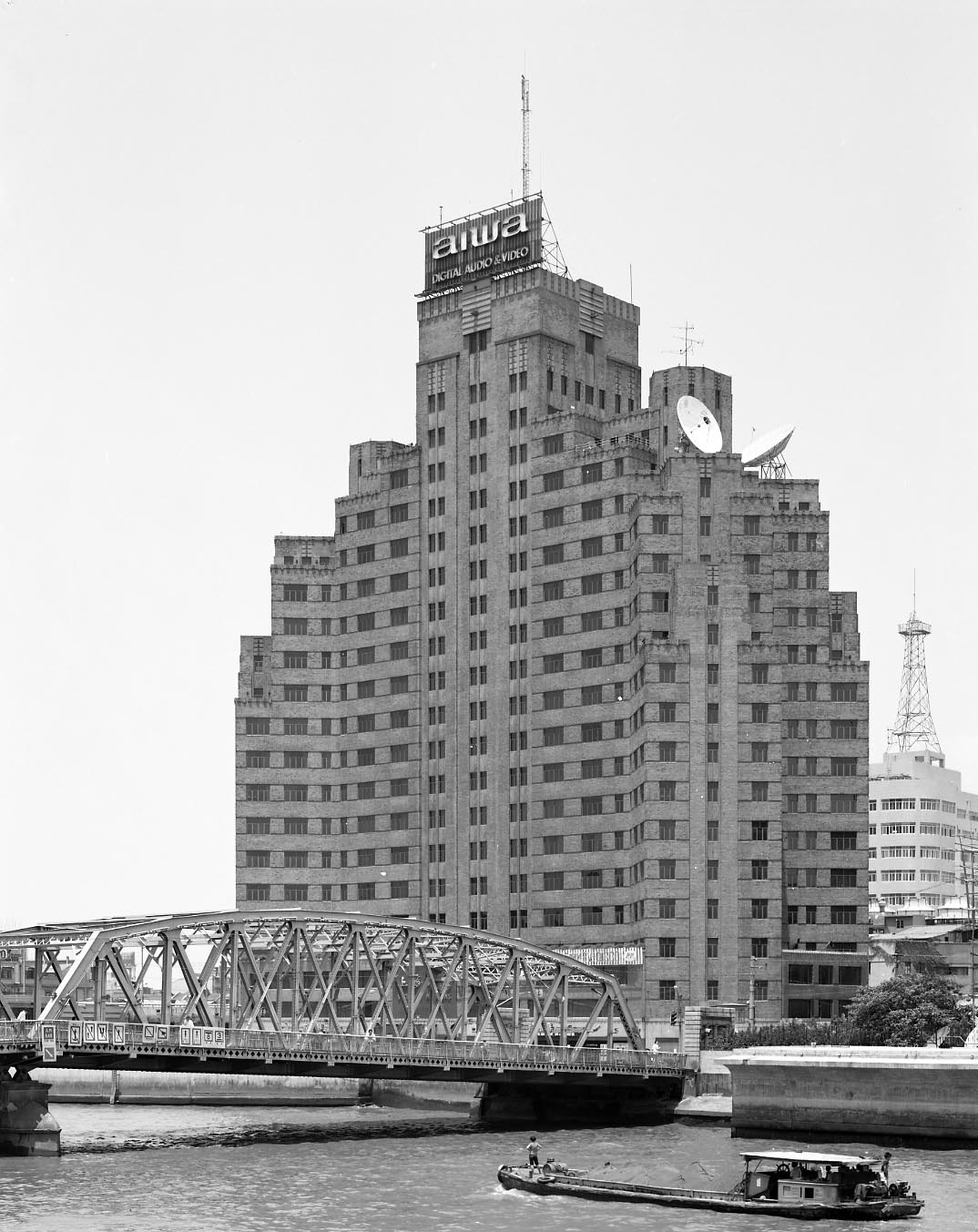
Broadway Mansion in 1994

The Broadway Mansions (simplified Chinese: 百老汇大厦; traditional Chinese: 百老匯大廈; pinyin: Bǎilǎohuì Dàshà, Shanghainese: Pahlowe Dusa) is a nineteen-floor Art Deco five-star hotel in Shanghai, China. and was for over five decades one of the primary symbols of Shanghai.

Completed in 1934, the same year as the 19 feet taller Park Hotel. Upon its completion it became the tallest apartment building in Shanghai and remained so for several decades. Located near the confluence of Suzhou Creek and the Huangpu River, as well as the northern end of The Bund, it was built by the architectural and engineering firm of Palmer and Turner, and its completion in 1935 heralded the commencement of the high-rise building era in Asia. It was Shanghai's "closest approach to a modern American skyscraper". It commands possibly the best view of the Bund and Huangpu.

Originally called "The Broadway Mansions", it was renamed "Shanghai Mansions" by the Shanghai Municipal Council in 1951, but reverted to its original name after China opened up again to the West. The Broadway Mansions has been owned and operated by the Shanghai Hengshan (Group) Holdings Company (上海市人民政府直属的上海衡山集团) since at least 1985.

== Location ==
The Broadway Mansions Hotel is located at 20 Bei Suzhou Road (formerly 1 Broadway), Shanghai, in the North Bund area of the Hongkou District. It is at the northern end of the Waibaidu Bridge (Garden Bridge). It is at the corner of Bei Suzhou Road, Huangpu Road, and Daming Road (formerly Broadway), and is less than 30 meters (98 ft) from the Suzhou Creek, close to its confluence with the Huangpu River. It is also bounded by Haining Road at the rear, and Wusong Road South on the west. It is across Daming Road from the Astor House Hotel. Before the mansions were constructed, a building owned by the British firm Shanghai electric construction company stood on its site.

== History ==
=== Broadway Mansions (1934–1951) ===
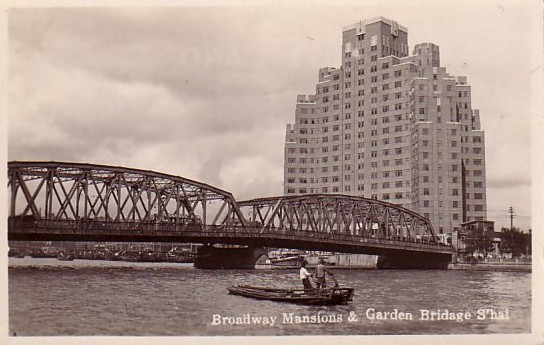
The Broadway Mansions in the 1930s

Construction for the Broadway Mansions was started in 1930, and completed by October 1934, and cost $10 million (Mexican) (approximately US$3.4 million at that time). The Mansions was "originally built in 1934 as an exclusive residential hotel by the British". The Mansions was built by Ye Guang Estate Property Company, for the Shanghai Land Investment, Company controlled by Sir Victor Sassoon. Additionally, Sassoon owned the Cathay Mansions, another apartment building in the French Concession. Along with the two other tallest buildings in Shanghai, (the Palace Hotel and Sassoon House), these skyscrapers were all owned by Baghdadi Jews. The chairman of the board was Harry Edward Arnhold (born 16 January 1879 in Hong Kong), a Briton of German ancestry who had been educated in Britain, the chairman of the Sassoon-controlled Arnhold & Company, a former Chairman of the British Chamber of Commerce in Shanghai (1923); and the sometime chairman of the Shanghai Municipal Council (SMC). The primary developer and financer of the Broadway Mansions was Dr. Maurice Benjamin who had "financed and built much of the Shanghai coast". Benjamin, who was one of the more prominent landowners and businessmen in Shanghai, considered an expert on real estate, was also a leading board member of the Shanghai Land Investment Company, and a former member of the Shanghai Municipal Council (1920–1921), According to Maisie Meyer, "Broadway Mansions was hailed as Maurice Benjamin's masterpiece."

In the years before the Second Sino-Japanese War, "Honkew's only outstanding building was the Broadway Mansion." On its completion, "this monumental pyramid was one of Shanghai's two tallest buildings." From its inception, it "had been a headquarters for Japanese commercial activity", due to its proximity to Shanghai's Little Tokyo, comprising the Yangpu and Hongkou districts. In 1932, Little Tokyo comprised 4.25 square miles (11 km^{2}) out of the entire 8.3 square miles (21 km^{2}) of the International Settlement, and had about 30,000 Japanese residents, while there about 20,000 other foreigners in both the International Settlement and French Concession combined. The area was dominated and controlled by the Japanese military. After the surrender of non-foreign Shanghai in November 1937, the International Settlement north of the Suzhou Creek, became almost exclusively Japanese in population.

==== Second Sino-Japanese War (1937–1945) ====
The Japanese military commandeered the Broadway Mansions at 11.00am on 17 August 1937, with all non-Japanese residents were ordered to evacuate from the Broadway Mansions by Japanese military sailors, often at the point of a bayonet. Soon the Japanese flag fluttered over the Broadway Mansions, to the great delight of Japanese admiral Isoroku Yamamoto who toured Shanghai in April 1938. The Mansions became a de facto Japanese possession. The Journal of the American Chamber of Commerce in the Philippines in discussing accommodation in Shanghai indicated: "Broadway Mansions? No. That's out. It is ... mostly empty and in darkness. Some Japanese military are there, that is all. It is a British property, Shanghai's newest and best apartment hotel. Another indemnity is accumulating." Within a year most of the Mansions was rented to Japanese tenants. According to testimony presented to a US Congress sub-committee, "Broadway Mansion is the "brain" of all Japanese control in Shanghai. Here most of the important combined policy meetings are held." The Mansions was used as the headquarters of the Japanese Army Liaison Office. Before December 1941, the Japanese military government held weekly (and later bi-weekly) press conferences at the Broadway Mansions, and had offices there, including its transportation office. Foreigners who transgressed the Japanese rules of the territory occupied by Japan were held for questioning in the Mansions.

After December 1938, as a result of a meeting of Japanese military authorities and the Japanese-appointed puppet regime Reformed Government of the Republic of China led by Liang Hongzhi in Nanjing, which led to the formation "the Jiangsu-Zhejiang-Anhui Opium Suppression Bureau (Su Zhe Wan jinyanju) on the fifth floor of the Broadway Mansions. ... They were empowered to control the import and distribution of opium, to enforce licensing conditions for opium hongs and smokers, and to collect revenues from opium sales. ... All fifty-eight licensed opium hongs in Shanghai ... had to pick up their opium requisitions from the bureau on the fifth floor of the Broadway Mansions." The Reformed Government (and its successor, the Reorganized Government of Wang Jingwei) had its Foreign Affairs Bureau on the fourth floor of the Broadway Mansions.

===== Sale of Broadway Mansions (March 1939) =====
In an unsuccessful attempt to increase the number of Japanese ratepayers and thus gain a majority on the Shanghai Municipal Council, which governed the International Settlement, a Japanese joint stock company purchased the Broadway Mansions in 21 March 1939 at a considerable loss to its owners for $5,000,000, with the considerable hesitation of H.E. (Harry) Arnhold, the chairman of the board. At that time The China Weekly Review reported: "One of the most luxurious hotels in Shanghai, Broadway Mansions has 156 hotel suites, 56 apartments, and eight offices and stores." Many non-missionary foreigners were interned at the Broadway Mansions after the bombing of Pearl Harbor in December 1941.

==== Highlights (1945–1949) ====
===== US Military occupancy (1945–1949) =====
After the Japanese surrender in August 1945, and the subsequent evacuation of its Japanese tenants and occupants, the Shanghai Municipal Council assumed ownership of the Broadway Mansions. The Council leased part of the Mansions to the foreign correspondents and the remainder to the United States military, where it became the headquarters for the American Military Mission that advised Chiang Kai-shek and the Nationalist government of the Republic of China. The first five or six floors of the Broadway Mansions was occupied by officers of the U.S. Military Aid Group in China (MAGIC) and their dependents, with 400 billets being provided at the Mansions. The ground floor hosted a small American army hospital. American fighter pilot Bill Dunn, one of the first to occupy the Mansions in August 1945, recalled: "In Shanghai we were billeted at the Broadway Mansions, a beautiful European-style hotel. There was only one problem: the rooms had no beds. Japanese officers had been billeted there, and they didn't use our type of bed, just sleeping mats. We got in touch with the hotel manager, who soon had a flock of Chinese setting up beds for us." About this time the manager was Michael Alexis Melgunow, a White Russian émigré, who had previously been the head chauffeur. After the alleged rape of two Chinese girls by American marines, approximately 5,000 anti-American Chinese university students marched on 1 January 1947 on the Broadway Mansions, at that time home for 200 U.S. servicemen and their dependents, demanding the American military (which they likened to the British imperialists and the Japanese aggressors) leave China. The American-owned China Weekly Review attributed the cause of the Chinese hostility to the "outrageous conduct" of American military police and other Army and Marine" personnel.

===== Foreign Correspondents' Club of China (1945–1949) =====
Also immediately after World War II, the Mansions hosted the Foreign Correspondents' Club of China, which had been founded in Chongqing on 18 May 1943, in its upper four floors, and billeted its members and their families, until soon after the establishment of the People's Republic of China in October 1949. American journalist John Robinson Beal explained: "It's easy to understand why the correspondents prefer Shanghai. One lives comfortably at the Broadway Mansions, ... one of the Far East's finest hotels, waited on hand and foot by servants", making it "the most decorous press club in Asia". Journalist Richard Hughes joked that "Most of the correspondents lived there, incestuously".

The bar was located in the penthouse on the 17th floor. The parties held in the Foreign Correspondents' Club were notorious. While there was intense fighting in the rural areas of China during the escalating Chinese Civil War, this "did not prevent the parties in the foreign correspondents' club atop the eighteen-story Broadway Mansions, where dancing went on under gaily colored lights." "on its top floor foreigners and their White Russian mistresses used to dance the sultry Shanghai nights away." At these parties, "White Russian mistresses mingled with the American wives and black market speculators with military personnel", who all cursed the Chinese, including both the Communists and Chiang Kai-shek. Along with the decline in value of the Chinese currency, both gambling and opium-smoking increased, as did concerns about what to do with their White Russian mistresses should the Communists triumph and evict them from China. The Mansions also hosted a popular brothel in this period of American occupancy.

While Edward Ward in 1947 considered the Mansions to be "one of the most modern luxury blocks of flats", Harrison Forman, noticing the changes in the Mansions since its halcyon days before the war, reflected on his return, "Now it looked rundown and motheaten." American Pulitzer Prize–winning journalist Keyes Beech described the Broadway Mansions as "a steel and concrete apartment hotel that shot eighteen stories up from the bank of Soochow Creek, an American pillar of plenty", but indicated that "the best thing about the Broadway Mansions was the view". In May 1949 the Broadway Mansions was still the tallest apartment building in Shanghai, but described as a "building with dull red brick".

==== The Battle of Broadway Mansions (25–27 May 1949) ====
From 25 May 1949, during the Chinese Civil War, one of the few significant battles in Shanghai was, what foreign residents called, "The Battle of Broadway Mansions", where for two days there was fierce fighting in the vicinity of the Broadway Mansions between the forces of the Kuomintang and the People's Liberation Army. From 30 April 1949 retreating Nationalist soldiers took possession of the Broadway Mansions, the nearby Central Post Office and the Embankment apartment complex. One hundred regulars from the army of the Republic of China commanded by a major, occupied the Broadway Mansions, as part of the Kuomintang's defense of Shanghai against the invading People's Liberation Army. Eventually, just over one thousand Nationalists defended the Broadway Mansions, where they had entrenched themselves on the upper floors, where they could shoot from the windows and from the roof. From the roof of Broadway Mansions, just above the Foreign Press Club, the Kuomintang snipers could rake the approaches to the Waibaidu Bridge by the advancing Communist forces. There about two hundred foreigners trapped within the Mansions during the battle, who were terrified for their safety. Peter Townsend recalls: "When you go out on the parapet of Broadway Mansions a bullet whistles above your head and you duck and crawl back on your hands and knees."

Journalist Edwin Palmer Hoyt, whose apartment was in the Broadway Mansions, described the defeat of the Kuomintang: "The rot of the Kuomintang was definitely showing, nowhere more tragically than on Soochow Creek, just below the windows of the Broadway Mansions Hotel, the press hotel for the correspondents. From the windows of their comfortable apartments, they could look out at the steaming mass of humanity crowded beneath." Townsend reported during the final stages of the battle, "They're hanging on at Broadway Mansions ... for nothing." According to Brown and Pickowicz, "The thousand or so Nationalists defending Broadway Mansions could have been subdued by the Communists in an hour if the latter had wanted to do so." The hoisting of the red flag with five yellow stars of the People's Republic of China on the roof of the Broadway Mansions on 27 May 1949 signified the final conquest of Shanghai by the People's Liberation Army.

==== Highlights (1949–1951) ====
After the surrender of Shanghai to the People's Liberation Army on 27 May 1949, and especially after the declaration of the People's Republic of China on 1 October 1949, the circumstances changed dramatically for the residents of the Broadway Mansions. According to Ross Terrill, "Foreign journalists drifted out of China to other assignments. The Foreign Correspondents Club in Broadway Mansions unraveled. Its Chinese staff were paid off; waiters were given leftover mustard. ... Today there are no dances, but you can get a good view" from the roof. On 20 June 1949 the remaining 11 foreigners residing in the Broadway Mansions were ordered to leave to make room for political and military workers. By 1950 the Shanghai branch of the Chinese Government Information Office, had its headquarters in the Broadway Mansions.

=== Shanghai Mansions (1951–1969) ===
On 1 May 1951, the Shanghai Municipal Council, who had assumed ownership in 1945, renamed the Mansions as "'Shanghai dasha' or the Grand Building of Shanghai", or as more popularly known in English, "the Shanghai Mansions". Apparently, in 1957, the Mansions was also known as the 'Golden River Hotel', which The Times journalist James Bertram (1910–1980) described as "an elaborate Western-style hotel-cum-apartment-house that has survived the war years and the Japanese occupation without visible change." In 1956 British novelist and film producer Rubeigh James Minney, who visited Shanghai in 1956, referred to the Shanghai Mansions' store on the ground floor: "On the ground floor there is a very superior general store", where, "the atmosphere was much more elegant: by contrast one might say it was on the Harrods level."

In 1965, the Mansions was described as "the huge ugly building in Shanghai". Belgian journalist Jacques Marcuse concurred with that assessment, describing the Mansions in 1967 as "that tall yet squat ugly building". while in the same year, Sally Backhouse, after describing "slab-like buildings that towered above the rest, holed by myriad windows and grimy with dirt, like dry old discolored cheese", indicated that "the largest of these was the famous 'Broadway Mansions', in capitalist days a block of luxury flats and rented buildings." Another resident described the Mansions in the mid-1960s as a huge hotel, but "Shanghai Mansion is not the most luxurious hotel in Shanghai."

==== Shanghai Mansion Incident (23–24 February 1967) ====
On 23 February 1967, a "grave incident" occurred at the Shanghai Agricultural Department, that became known as the Shanghai Mansions Incident. During the period of the Shanghai Revolution (or January Revolution) of January 1967, which led to the short-lived Shanghai People's Commune, on 20 February, men "were sent to the Shanghai mansion to urge the [striking] workers to go back to their agricultural production posts." On 23 February 1967, an "expatriate rebel group which had set up headquarters in the Shanghai Mansions, staged an assault on the Revolutionary Committee's economic department". On 24 February 1967, the evening the Shanghai Commune was renamed the Shanghai Municipal Revolutionary Committee at the instigation of Mao Zedong, "the committee sent some 'representatives' on a 'fact-finding investigation' to ... the Shanghai Mansion, the site of an apparently large but undetermined colony of returnees from the countryside." These 'counter-revolutionary" forces were suppressed, and the ring leaders were punished. However, after this incident "they continued to deploy large numbers around the Shanghai Mansions day and night, beating up public security personnel."

=== Anti-Imperialism Building (c. 1969-1972) ===
During the Cultural Revolution, the Mansions was renamed the Anti-Imperialism Building by Chinese Red Guards.

=== Shanghai Mansions Hotel (c. 1972 to c. 1996) ===
By 1973, the Mansions was renamed in English the Shanghai Mansions Hotel, but retained its Chinese name. By 1973 the Mansions was the third-choice accommodation provided for Overseas Chinese: "If there isn't enough room at these two hotels, then Overseas Chinese are put into the sky scraping Shanghai Mansions Hotel overlooking the Bund. During the 1970s the Mansion was also the primary residence for "foreign experts". Edoarda Masi, an Italian language teacher, who lived at the Mansions for a year between 1976 and 1977, described the Mansions as "a mastodon among the low buildings that surround it; walls, plumbing, closets are all solid." Referring to the Mansion's popularity, Masi indicated: "Depending on the time of year, this large room is half empty or crowded with tourists. The Dasha, which is known in English as Shanghai Mansions, for long stopovers. By 1978 the Mansions was used increasingly as a hotel for visitors from Third World countries, thus improving the accommodation situation in Shanghai.

An American academic who stayed at the Mansions in the summer of 1982, said: "With its somewhat shabby decor, the hotel lobby at Shanghai Mansions was a hangout in the evenings for the African and Middle Eastern students of Shanghai." By 1984, "The Shanghai Mansions, consisting of a main and a side building, is a hotel accommodating foreign tourists, businessmen, overseas Chinese." At that time the Mansions had 370 guest rooms (including some deluxe suites) and 1,468 beds. In 1985 one visitor referred to the "Thirties fortress of Shanghai Mansions, its thick brick walls pocked by black windows. The General Manager of the Mansions from 1985 to at least 1999 was Tao Pei Tai (born 1 August 1946), who was also Deputy General Manager of Hengshan Group Holding Co., the owner of the Mansion. In 1989 a double room in the Mansions was US$50 per night. One 1991 Chinese travel guide extolled the service ethic of the Mansion: "The Shanghai Mansions adheres strictly to the guideline of "guests first, service first, courtesy first and tidiness first". However, after September 1993 the Mansions was no longer the dominant landmark in the Shanghai landscape:

The announcement of the metropolis has also changed. It is no longer the magnificent art deco silhouette of the Shanghai Dasha [Shanghai Mansions] or the Waibaidu metallic bridge which marks the beginning of the center city and the Bund but, much further upstream, the Yangpu stayed-girder bridge. Completed in 1993, it has become the huge waterway entrance into the city, as role reclaimed, the Nanpu Bridge located downstream.

While acknowledging that "the view to the river from the rooftop terrace ... is breathtaking", one 1993 guidebook warned, "Unfortunately, its location can become a drawback in the evening, as the sonorous horns of the river barges pose a constant challenge to sleep." In 1995 the Shanghai Mansions was evaluated by the State Tourism Bureau, and named one of the twelve national best star hotels.

=== Broadway Mansions Hotel (c. 1996 to today) ===
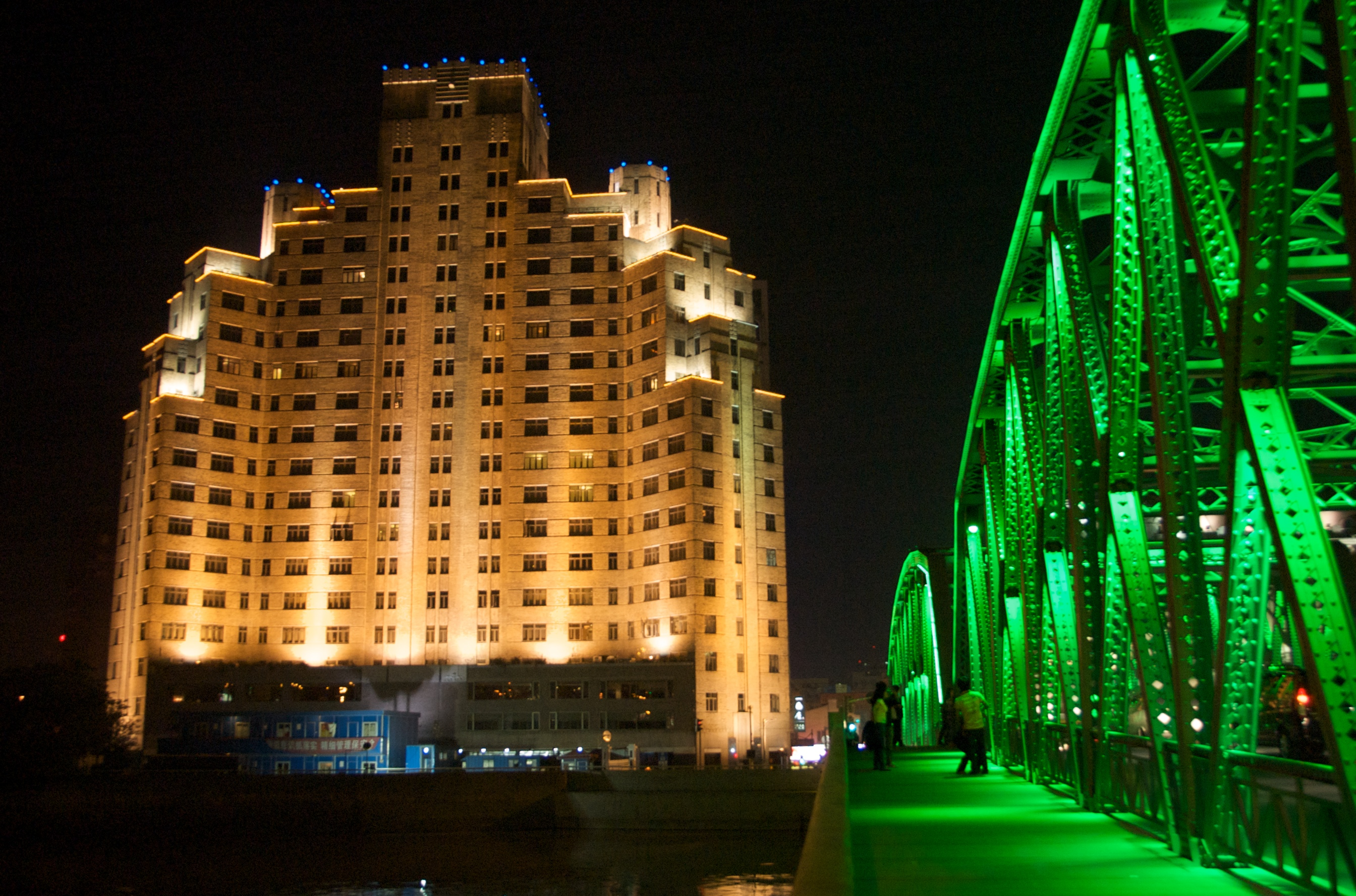
Broadway Mansions at night, 2009

By 1996, the Mansions was again renamed - this time a reversion to a name similar to its original name - the Broadway Mansions Hotel, reflecting the increased openness to the West as a result of the reforms of Deng Xiaoping, and the shift from providing long-term residential apartment accommodation to that of a hotel. At that time the Mansions was described as "rather dull compared to other Shanghai hotels".

The Hotel was partially renovated in 2003.

== Ownership ==
The Broadway Mansions has been owned and operated by the Shanghai Hengshan (Group) Holdings Company (上海市人民政府直属的上海衡山集) since at least 1985. The current president is Mr. Mu Xiangyang. The Hengshan Hotels and Resorts owns five other hotels in Shanghai, including the Astor House Hotel, across the road from the Broadway Mansions.

== Amenities ==
The Broadway Mansions was the first hotel in Shanghai to have a restaurant on the top of the building. Today the Broadway Mansions Hotel has six restaurants, and is famous for its Huaiyang cuisine.

== Architecture ==
According to Professor Anne Warr,

Despite the uncertainties of the 1930s, in particular the increasing Japanese control over Chinese territory, the growing influence of the Communist Party, and the corruption of the Nationalist Government, Shanghai boomed. The first American style Art Deco skyscraper appeared on The Bund just as the American economy collapsed and Shanghai was about to enter its most dynamic decade. At the end of the 1920s as Europe and America went into financial depression, shiploads of unemployed foreigners arrived in Shanghai seeking their fortune. In three years, Shanghai’s foreign population almost doubled, from 36,500 in 1930 to 70,000 in 1933. Architects abandoned the Beaux-Arts styles of earlier decades and whole-heartedly embraced Art Deco and Modernism. ... During this period, clashing concepts of nationalism, imperialism and internationalism were reflected in the architecture. Internationalism from New York permeated Shanghai in the form of skyscrapers and the latest Hollywood movies, while Japanese imperialism filtered into every corner.

The Broadway Mansions was designed by Mr. B. Flazer, and the structural engineer who supervised construction was John William Barrow, both of the architectural firm of Palmer & Turner. Palmer & Turner, who designed many of Shanghai's major buildings (13 buildings on the Bund alone), was one of the oldest architectural firms in the world, and was founded by British architect William Salway (1844–1902) in Hong Kong in 1868. British architect Clement Palmer (1857–1952) joined the firm in 1883, while structural engineer Arthur Turner (born 1858) joined the next year. Palmer and Turner became partners in 1891. In 1912 they established a branch in Shanghai managed by British architect, George Leopold "Tug" Wilson (1881–1967). Palmer & Turner designed many of the buildings on The Bund, including the Neo-Renaissance style Union Building (1916), its first work in Shanghai, and the first building in Shanghai to use a steel structure; the Neo-Renaissance Mercantile Bank of India, London and China building (1916); the Yokohama Specie Bank Building (1920s); and the neo-classical HSBC Building (1921–1923); the adjacent Greek Revival neo-classical Customs House (1927). Wilson had supervised construction of the majority of British buildings along The Bund until their new client, Sir Victor Sassoon tilted them towards Art Deco and Modernism at the end of the 1920s, and such buildings as the Art Deco Sassoon House (1926–1929); the Yangtze Insurance Building; the Broadway Mansions (1934); and subsequently the Old Bank of China Building, Shanghai (1937).

The Broadway Mansions is "a brick patterned Art Deco apartment block ...[that] would not have looked out of place in Manhattan", and is an example of the Art Deco or Streamline Moderne style of architecture that emerged in the 1920s and flourished in the 1930s The Broadway Mansions is a steel-framed red brick building "in the stepped skyscraper mode", that is 78 meters (256 ft) in height, with a total floor space of 24,596 square meters (264,750 sq ft). Steel-framed structures were used in Shanghai from 1916 onwards, originally for eight- to ten-story buildings, but by the 1930s, for up to twenty-four stories. The building's floor plan was modeled after the Chinese character for the number eight, which is a symbol of luck and prosperity. The facade of the Broadway Mansions was one of its distinctive features. The design of the Mansions was "influenced by modernism", and like "most apartment buildings in Shanghai featured a simple and modern style of exterior".

According to Peter Rowe and Seng Kuan, after describing the Metropole Hotel and Hamilton House, also designed by Palmer & Turner about the same time: "A similar approach to both architecture and place making was taken almost simultaneously by B. Flazer, with the curved symmetric stepped-back facade of the Broadway Mansions. ... The firm of Palmer and Turner was to continue with curvilinear plan forms in the organic layout of the large Embankment Building of 1933. The Mansions had a roof top garden, and even a squash court. Initially the Mansions had 370 guest rooms, and also housed offices and shops. According to Fiona Shen, "part hotel, part apartment block, it also catered to that fixture of Shanghai economic life during the Concession period - the young, single expatriate - with its 99 stylish and compact bachelor pads." Broadway Mansions Hotel was the first hotel in Shanghai that had an indoor parking facility, a structure that had four levels with 80 spaces. The phone system was built at the time of its construction, and its phone number (46260) has remained unchanged.

== Reviews ==
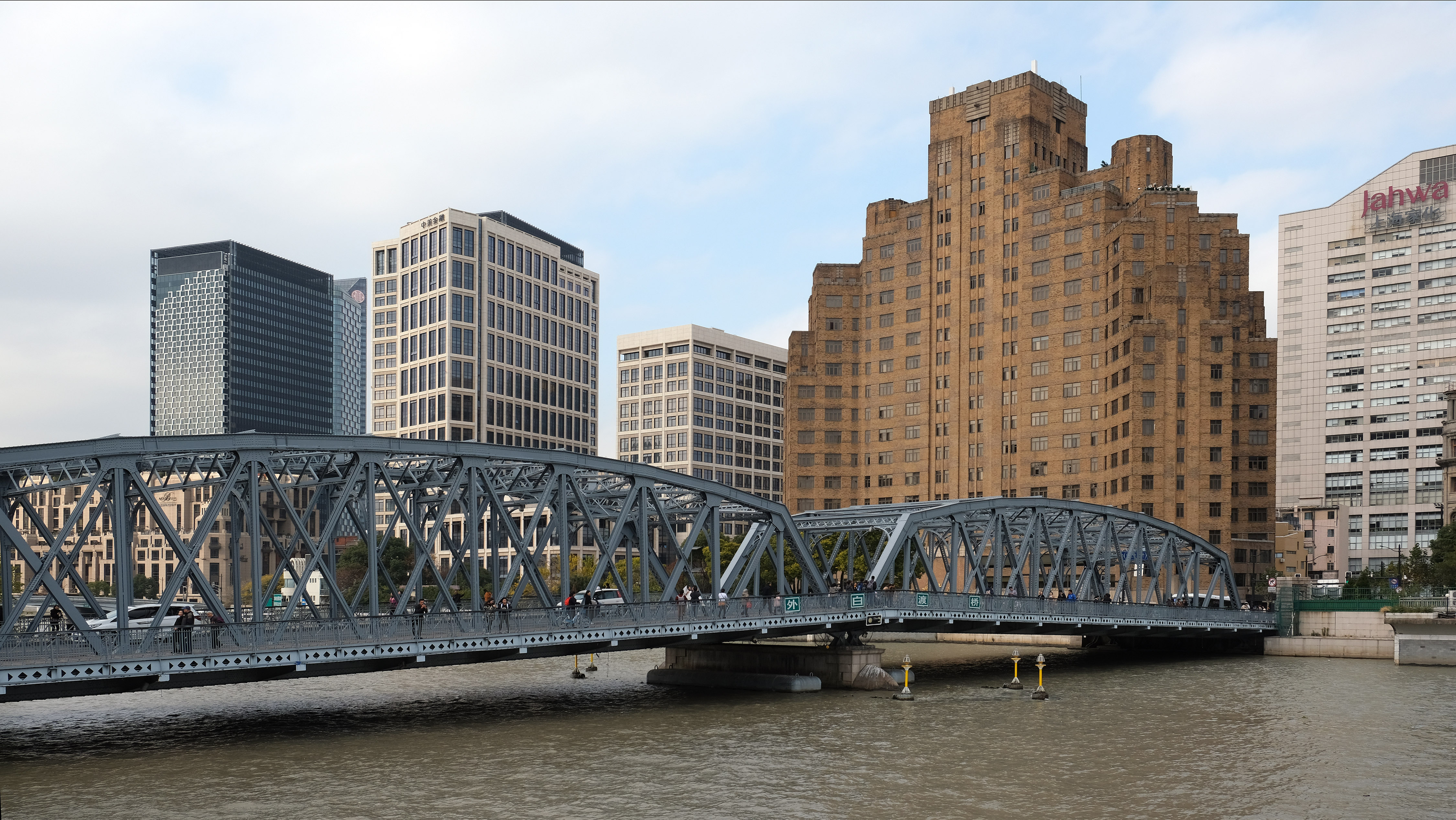
The Broadway Mansions (behind) is situated next to the Garden Bridge.

The Broadway Mansions is considered "one of the finest architectural examples in Shanghai, and the ideal starting point for an art deco walking tour of the city, ... an unashamedly Gotham-esque structure with a commanding location to the north of the Bund." Soon after its opening, the Mansions was described as a "prominent, tall white structure", Professor Lancelot Forster was enthusiastic in his assessment of the newly completed Broadway Mansions in 1936. After describing its contemporary, the Cathay Hotel, which "seems to point to loftier things, ... defying the smug security of the earth as it soars upwards, and yet not so blatantly as the new Broadway Mansions which, abandoning all restraint ... lifts its optimistic head from its broad substantial shoulders and shouts to the settlement."

Canadian Gordon Sinclar, described the Mansions "as posh an apartment house as anything in Toronto or Montreal." One travel guide described the Mansions as "a 22-story brick ziggurat". Harold Conant, who lived in Shanghai for ten years from 1931, depicted the Mansions: "The Broadway Mansions, which seems to be so constructed that the wind always whistles through it (which is very cheering on a hot summer day), seems to have been shown quite frequently in American newspapers". Gary Jones wrote, "the 22-floor ocher-brick structure is now dwarfed by twinkling skyscrapers that have sprung up in recent years, and yet still exudes a menacing solidity and here-to-stay confidence.

== Notable people ==
=== Guests ===
According to its official website, Broadway Mansions Hotel has accommodated hundreds of leaders and government delegates from different nations around the world. Some of these include:

- New Zealand-born William Lancelot Holland (28 December 1907 - May 2008), Research Secretary and later Executive Secretary of the Institute of Pacific Relations (1928–1960), and editor of its periodical, Far Eastern Survey and Pacific Affairs, stayed at the Broadway Mansions for several months from July 1937;
- American aviator Royal Leonard (1905–1962), the personal pilot of Chiang Kai-shek, was staying at the Broadway Mansions during the initial days of the Second Sino-Japanese War, and was able to then fly to Hong Kong after the regular air service had been terminated due to aerial combat between Japanese and Chinese forces;
- Canadian socialist James Gareth Endicott (1898–1993), a controversial former United Church of Canada missionary, former advisor to Chiang Kai-shek, but from 1945 a supporter of the Chinese Communist Party and friend of Zhou Enlai, and founder in 1949 of the Canadian Peace Congress, and a 1952 winner of the Stalin Peace Prize, stayed at the Shanghai Mansions on a return visit to China in 1952 with his wife, Mary Austin Endicott;
- Swiss photojournalist Fernand Gignon, one of few non-Communist reporters permitted to enter the People's Republic of China in the early 1960s, stayed on the 3rd floor of the Shanghai Mansions, "le plus grand complexe locatif de la métropole."
- American businessman and human rights campaigner John Kamm spent a week at the Shanghai Mansions in January 1976 when he was a representative of the National Council for US-China Trade. His account was published as a part of a series in the Hong Kong Economic Journal.

=== Residents ===
- Cornelius Vander Starr (15 October 1892 – 20 December 1968), an American businessman and Office of Strategic Services operative who founded the American International Group (AIG) insurance corporation in Shanghai in 1919, occupied the penthouse of the Broadway Mansions until the outbreak of World War II;
- American journalist Hallett Edward Abend (born 15 September 1884 in Portland, Oregon; died 28 November 1955 in Sonora, California), correspondent for The New York Times, had a long-term lease, and lived and worked from Apartment G, "a luxurious penthouse", on the 16th floor, from 1935 until July 1940. On the evening of 19 July 1940, Abend was robbed and tortured by two Japanese men in his room, who "next morning again wore the uniform of officers of the Imperial Army of Japan". The next morning Abend moved "to another apartment in an area supervised by the Americans and British. In August 1937, after all tenants had been evacuated from the Mansions by Japanese forces, Abend's apartment was searched by men believed to be associated with the Japanese consulate;
- Italian Amleto Vespa (1888 – c. 1940), a mercenary and secret agent for Manchuria and later reluctantly for the Empire of Japan, lived at the Mansions from 1937;
- Japanese ultra-nationalist yakuza figure and convicted Class A war criminal Yoshio Kodama (児玉誉士夫 18 February 1911 – 17 January 1984), stayed at the Broadway Mansions during the Second Sino-Japanese War;
- American Robert Shaplen, foreign correspondent for The New Yorker, resided at the Broadway Mansions for two years immediately after the conclusion of World War II;
- American Jack Birns, one of Life magazine's staff photo journalists, resided at the Broadway Mansions from 15 December 1947;
- French photographer Henri Cartier-Bresson (22 August 1908 – 3 August 2004), considered to be the father of modern photojournalism, and co-founder of Magnum Photos, an international photographic cooperative, lived in the Broadway Mansions for a year from the middle of 1949, covering the fall of the Nationalist government and the creation of the People's Republic of China;
