= Shanghai Greenway =

Linked walking and cycling routes in Shanghai, China

Shanghai Greenway (上海绿地)
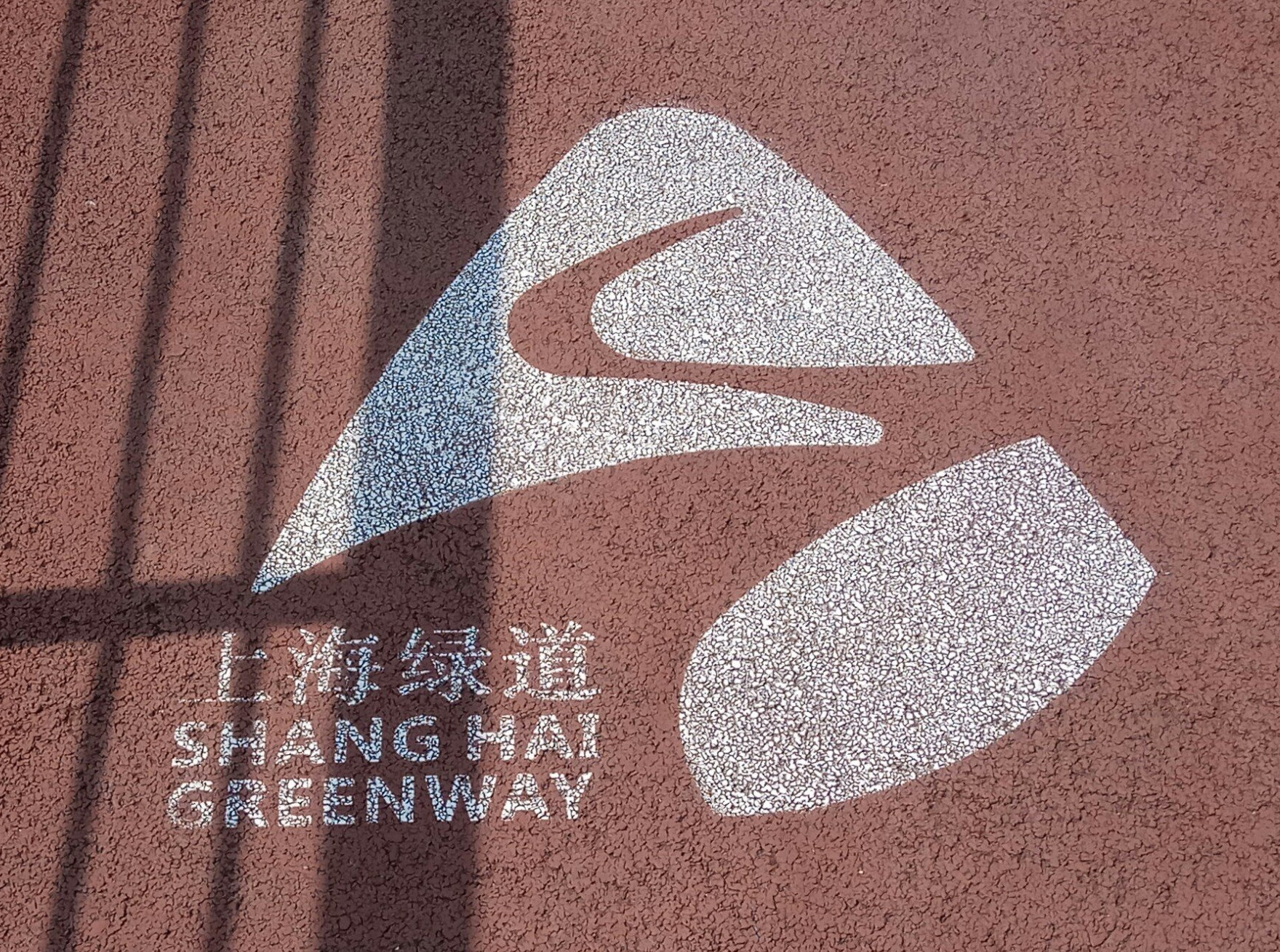
- Shanghai Greenway logo stencilled onto the ground
- Length: Several hundred km
- Location: Shanghai, China
- Use: Walking, cycling, recreation
- Difficulty: Beginner
- Season: All year

The Shanghai Greenway is a greenway in Shanghai, China. It consists of many sections of marked paths lined with landscaped foliage passing through several urban parks.

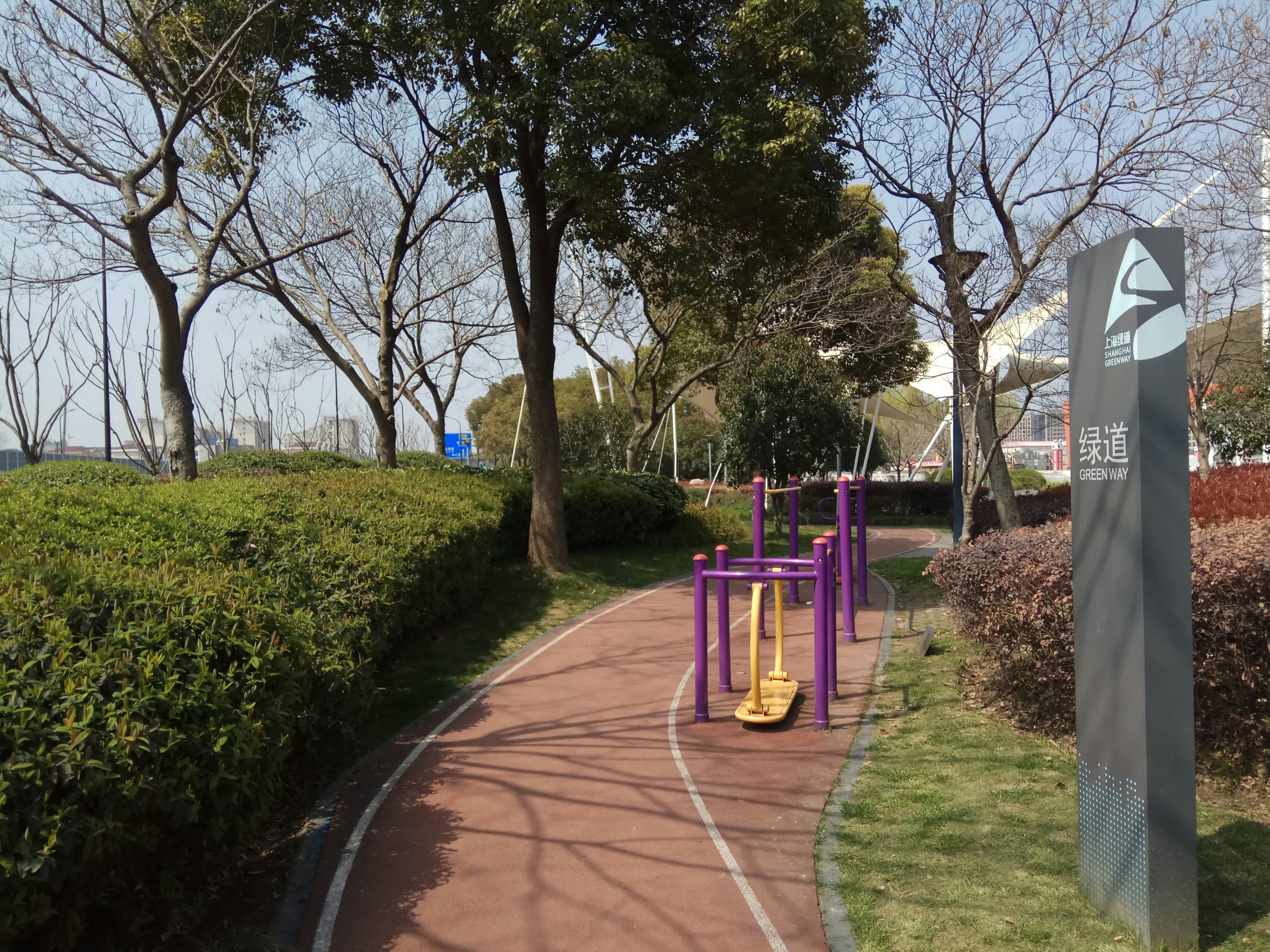
Adult exercise equipment in Fengling Park

The Changning section runs from South to North along the outer ring road close to Hongqiao Airport. The Greenway then runs East to West along the Suzhou Creek starting with the new, specially-constructed Linkong Music Park running almost uninterrupted to the Waibaidu Bridge by The Bund.

There is a section along the Huangpu River which has pedestrian, cycling and mixed stretches.

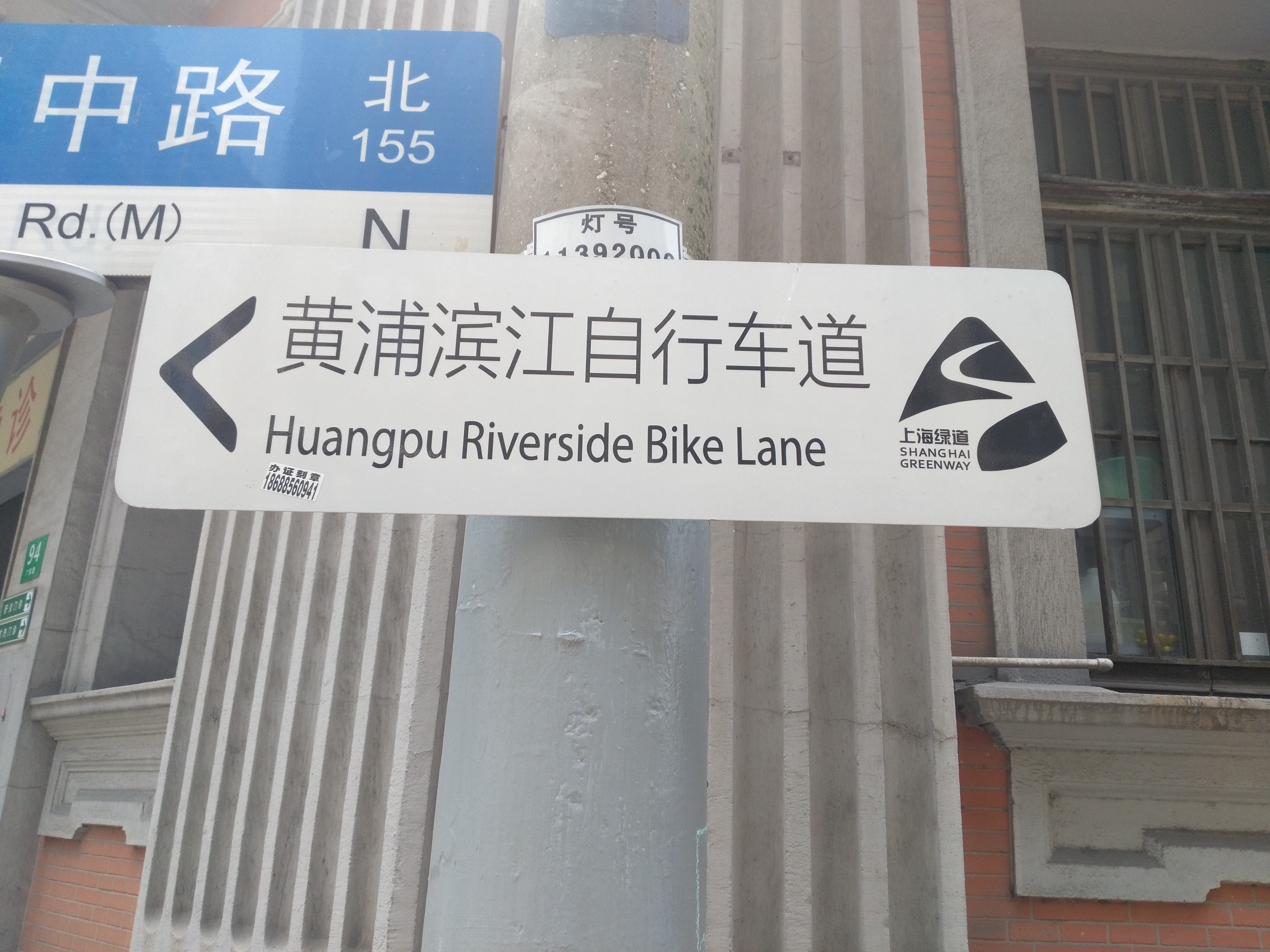
Directional signs for Huangpu Riverside Bike Line Featuring Shanghai Greenway Branding

There are sections of Greenway in Pudong, Baoshan, Putuo, Jiading, Minhang, Xuhui and Changning Districts, which follow the route of the Outer Ring Road and connect together to form a continuous 112-kilometre loop.

Map of the Outer Ring Road, which is planned to be lined with connected Greenways
