= Huangpu Park =

Urban park

Coordinates: 31°14′38″N 121°29′10″E

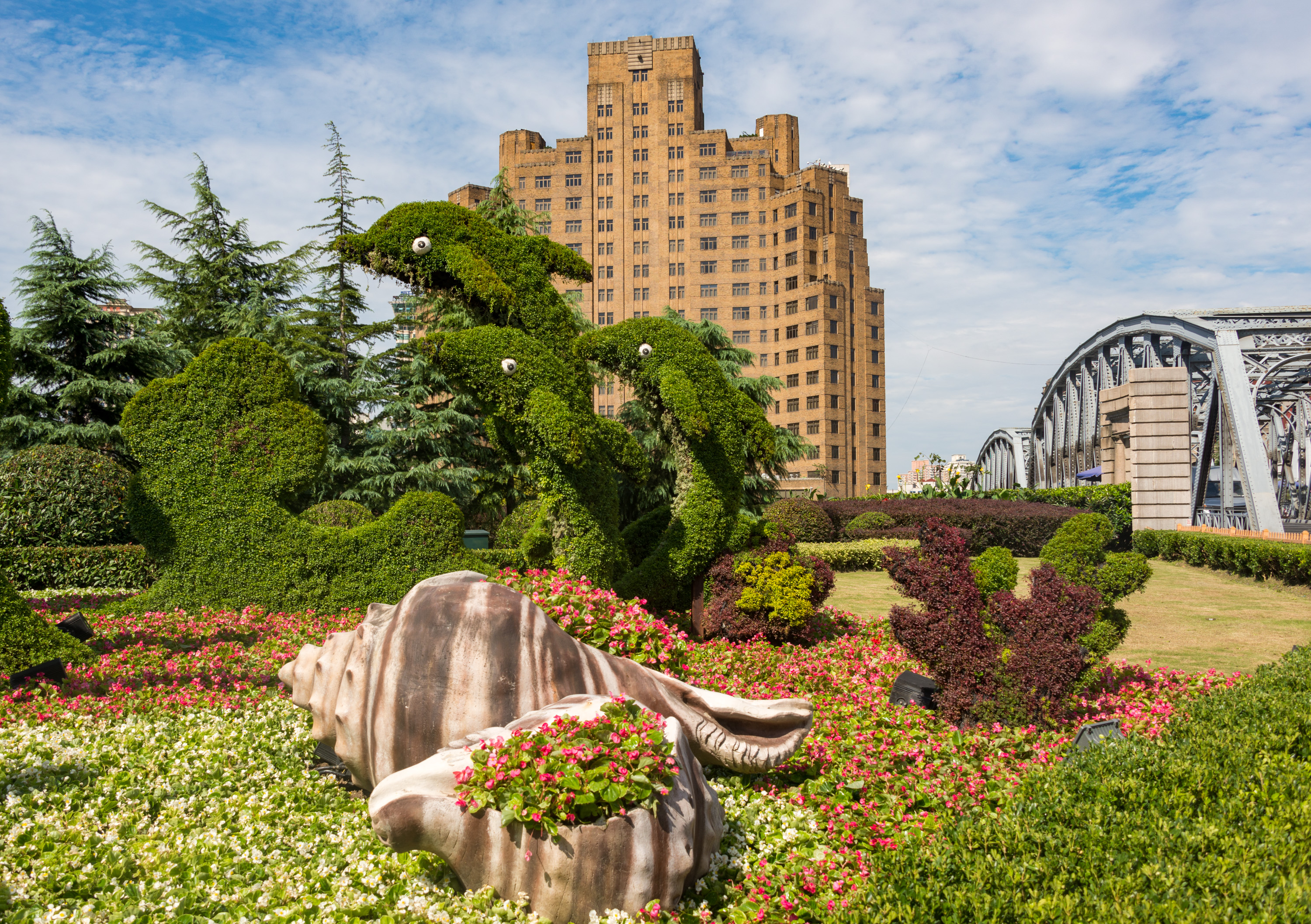
- Huangpu Park in 2016
- Interactive map of Huangpu Park
- Type: Public park
- Location: Shanghai, China

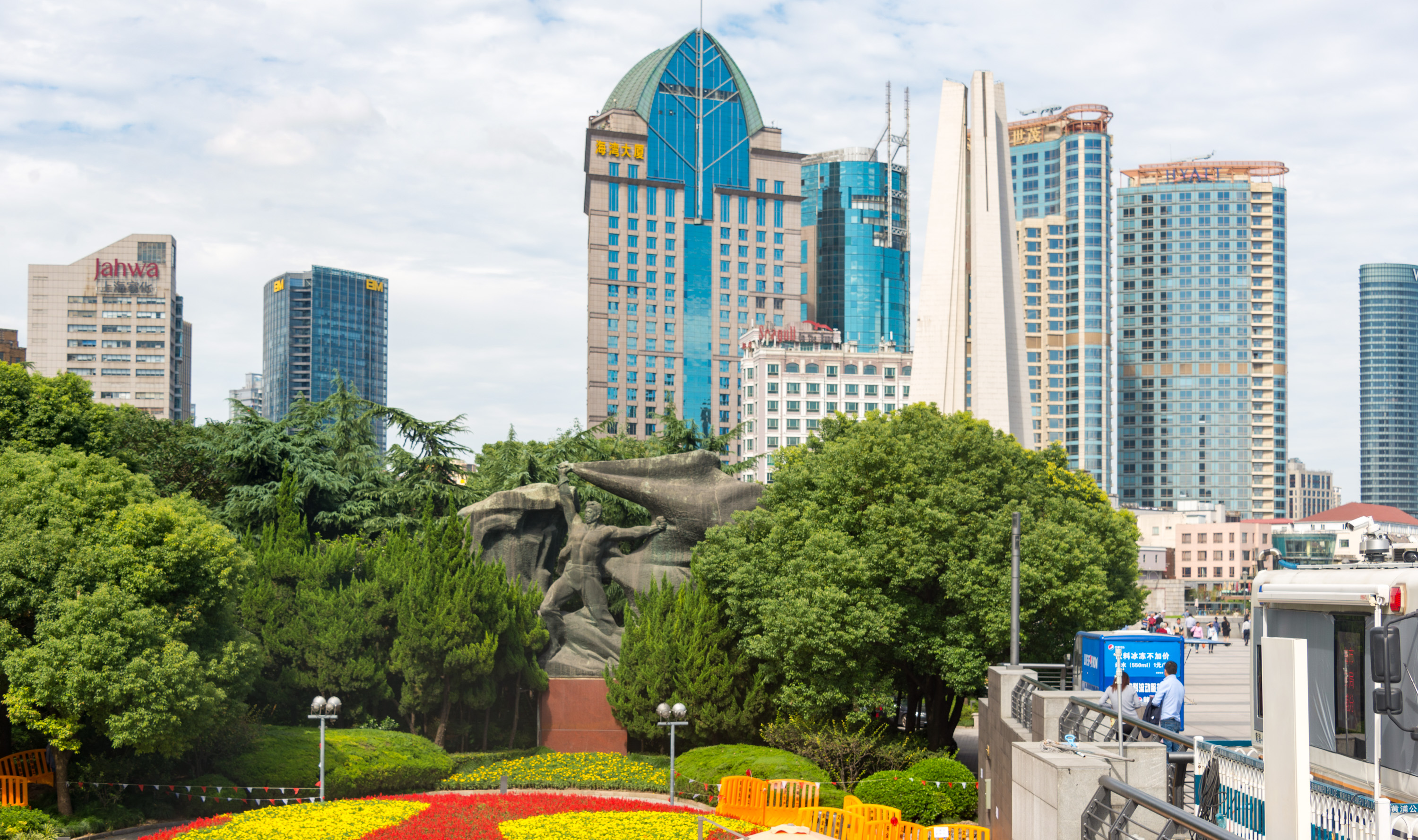
Huangpu Park in 2016

Huangpu Park (simplified Chinese: 黄浦公园; traditional Chinese: 黃浦公園; pinyin: Huángpǔ Gōngyuán; Shanghainese: Waonphu Gonyu) is the name of the triangular stretch of green at the northern end of the Bund in Shanghai, the oldest and smallest park of the city. It is the site of the large Monument to the People's Heroes, commemorating those who helped to free China from foreign occupation, and of the Bund Historical Museum, which documents the history of the Bund in old photographs.

== Name and history ==
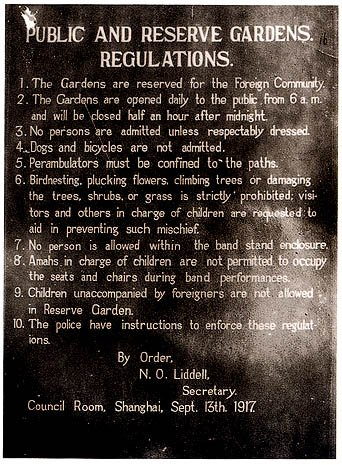
Park regulations, 1917

The first park at the location was established in 1886 with the simple name "Public Garden", and was the first park in China open to the public. Designed by a Scottish gardener in European style, it included a resting pavilion and a tennis court, aiming at the increasing number of foreigners living in Shanghai since the city had become an international trade port in the 1840s.

The Public Garden was closed to Chinese people between 1890 and 1928 (although, as rule 8 in the photo above of the 1917 park sign states "amahs in charge of children are not permitted to occupy the seats and chairs during performances", at least Chinese amahs were permitted to enter the park when caring for foreign children), according to a popular myth, a sign at the park's gate read No dogs or Chinese allowed. However, period photographs show a sign listing ten regulations, the first of which was "The Gardens are reserved for the Foreign Community", with the fourth being "Dogs and bicycles are not admitted". In any case, the banning of Chinese from Huangpu Park and other parks in China has remained in the Chinese public mind as one of the many examples of the country's humiliation by the Western powers in the 19th and early 20th century. For instance, the legend is manifested in the Bruce Lee film Fist of Fury, where a scene taking place at Huangpu Park gate features a (fictitious) "No dogs and Chinese allowed" (狗與華人不得入內) sign.

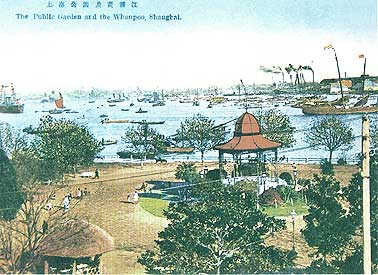
The Public Garden in the 1920s

After World War II, Public Garden was renamed "Huangpu Park". Confined by Suzhou Creek to the north and Huangpu River to the east, the park bears the name of the latter, larger river.

The Park was remodelled in the 1990s with the addition of the Monument to the People's Heroes and the Bund Historical Museum.

While the place looks very different today, the historical name of Huangpu Park lives on in the names of places in the neighbourhood like Garden Bridge and the New Bund Garden, a high-rise apartment building in Hongkou District.

== Places nearby ==
- Waibaidu Bridge (Garden Bridge)

== In films ==
A famous scene at Huangpu Park in the Bruce Lee film Fist of Fury (1972) features a fictitious sign that reads: "No dogs and Chinese allowed" in the context of the Japanese occupation in Shanghai, at the beginning of the 20th century.

== See also ==
- "Dogs and Indians not allowed" signboard in India
