= Hallett Edward Abend =

American journalist

- Born: 15 September 1884; Portland, Oregon
- Died: 28 November 1955 (aged 71); Sonora, California
- Occupation: Journalist

Hallett Edward Abend (15 September 1884 – 28 November 1955) was an American journalist who is today known for his journalistic reporting in China during the Second Sino-Japanese War.

== Life ==
He was born in Portland, Oregon on 15 September 1884.

He died of a heart attack in the Sonora Hospital, Sonora, California on 28 November 1955 at the age of 66 years. His obituary was published by his employer, the New York Times.

== Education ==
He attended Lewiston High School.

He attended Stanford University for three years.

He spoke and read and wrote the Chinese language very fluently.

== Career ==
He had a brief stint in Hollywood where he worked as a scriptwriter for early silent films.

He started his journalistic career by working as a cub reporter for the Lewiston Morning Tribune.

After that he worked as a journalist for a number of newspapers including: the Honolulu Star-Bulletin, the Idaho Daily Statesman and the Los Angeles Times.

=== New York Times ===
In 1926, he received an offer to become the chief New York Times correspondent in Peking (Beijing), China, as part of a six-months' assignement. He ended up working in China for the next 15 years and reported on the Second Sino-Japanese War.

He was injured during an aerial bombardment of the Beijing city by the Japanese armed forces.

== Bibliography ==
He is the author of a number of notable books:

- Ramparts of the pacific - https://archive.org/details/rampartsofpacifi0000hall/page/n7/mode/2up
- The God from the West: A Biography of Frederick Townsend Ward
- My Life In China 1926-1941 - https://archive.org/details/mylifeinchina192007622mbp
- Half Slave, Half Free: This Divided World
- Japan Unmasked - https://archive.org/details/in.ernet.dli.2015.177747
- Can China Survive? - https://archive.org/details/canchinasurvive0000hall

== See also ==
- Second Sino-Japanese War
- New York Times
- Edna Lee Booker
