= Yangtze Insurance Building =

Building in Shanghai, China

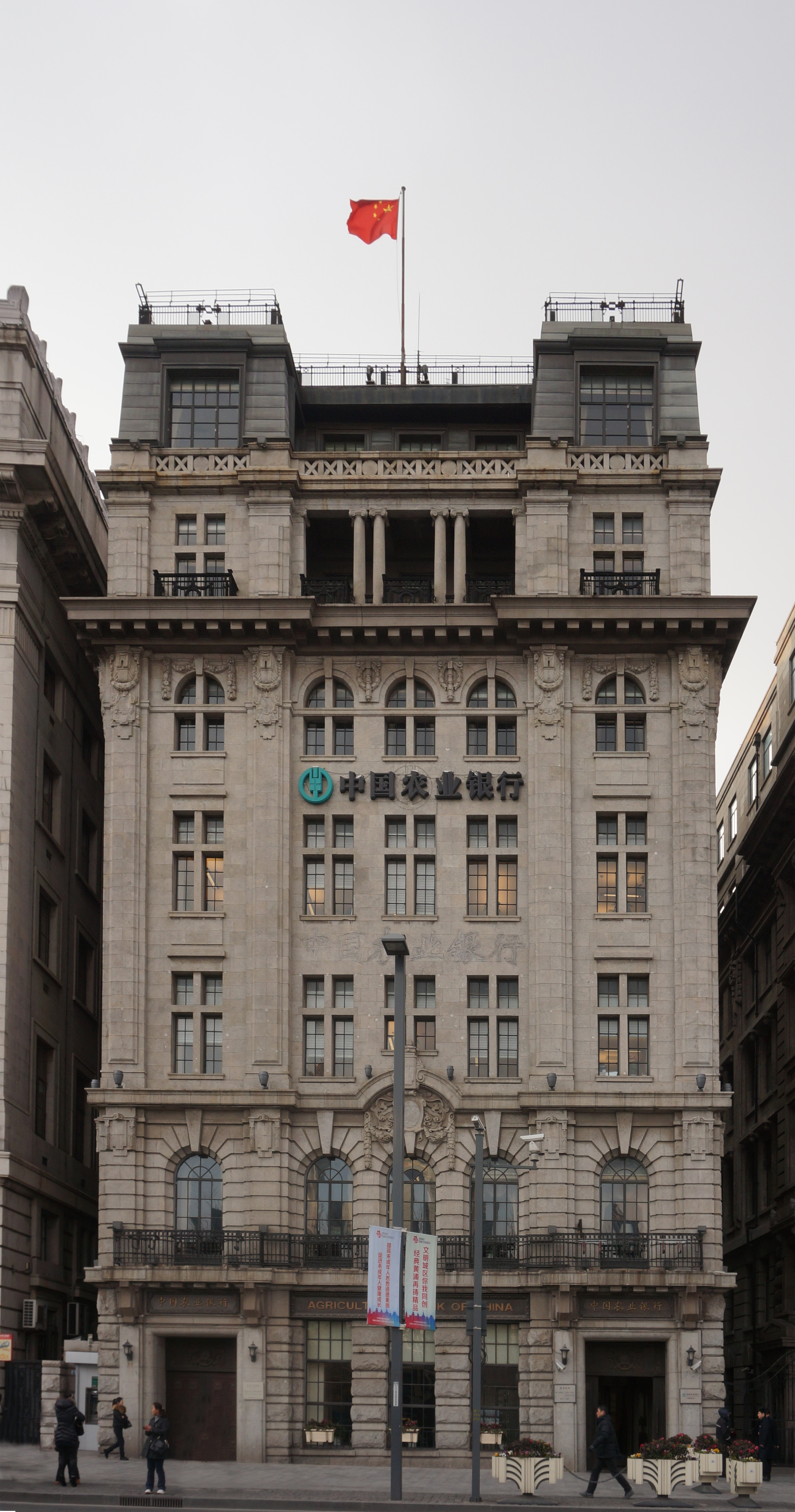
Yangste Insurance Assoc. Building - The Bund - Shanghai (Elevation)

The Yangtze Insurance is a 7-floor building in Shanghai that was completed in the 1920s. It was built by architects P & T Architects Limited (Palmer and Turner).
