= Waibaidu Bridge =

Waibaidu Bridge 外白渡桥
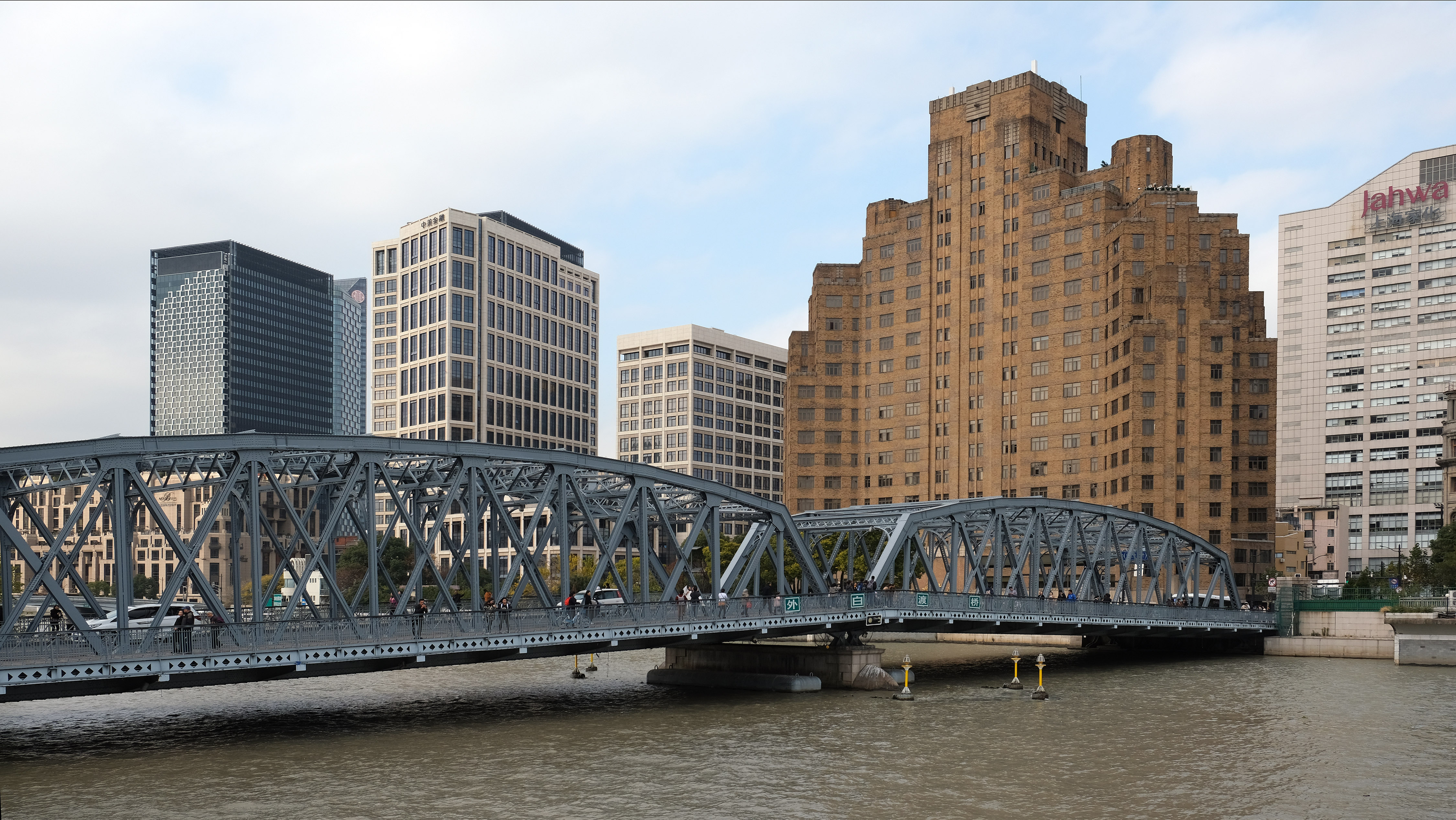
- Waibaidu Bridge in 2019
- Coordinates: 31°14′35″N 121°29′24″E
- Carries: Road and pedestrian
- Crosses: Suzhou Creek
- Locale: Near confluence of Huangpu River and Suzhou Creek, Shanghai, China
- Other name: Garden Bridge

Characteristics
- Design: camelback truss bridge
- Material: Steel
- Total length: 104.9 metres (344 ft)
- Width: 18.4 metres (60 ft)
- Longest span: 52.16 metres (171.1 ft)
- No. of spans: 2
- Piers in water: 1
- Load limit: 20.32 tonnes (20.00 long tons; 22.40 short tons)
- Clearance below: 3.25 metres (10.7 ft) highest tide; 5.57 metres (18.3 ft) lowest tide

History
- Designer: Howarth Erskine Ltd
- Constructed by: Cleveland Bridge & Engineering Company
- Construction start: 4 August 1906
- Construction end: 29 December 1907
- Opened: 20 January 1908

Location
- Interactive map of Waibaidu Bridge

The Waibaidu Bridge (Chinese: 外白渡桥; pinyin: Wàibáidù Qiáo; Shanghainese: Ngabahdu Jio), called the Garden Bridge in English, is the first all-steel bridge, and the only surviving example of a camelback truss bridge in China. The present bridge is the fourth Western-designed bridge built at its location since 1856, in the downstream of the estuary of the Suzhou Creek (formerly known as Wusong or Soochow Creek), near its confluence with the Huangpu River, adjacent to the Bund in central Shanghai. It connects the Huangpu and Hongkou districts and was opened on 20 January 1908. With its history and unique design, the Waibaidu Bridge is a prominent landmark in Shanghai. On 15 February 1994, the Shanghai Municipal Government declared the bridge an example of Heritage Architecture, and one of the outstanding structures in Shanghai. In an ever-changing metropolis, the Waibaidu Bridge remains a popular attraction and one of the few constants in the city skyline.

== Etymology ==
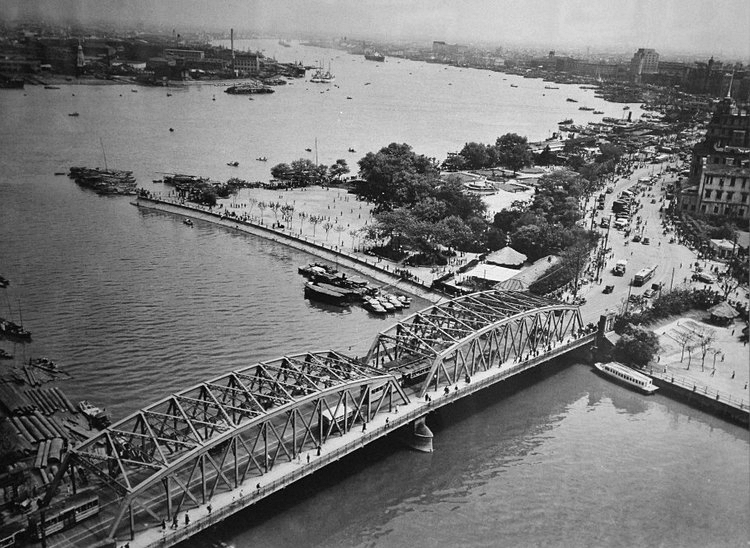
Waibaidu Bridge in the 1930s, photographed by the photographer Lang Jingshan

There is considerable debate about the exact meaning of Waibaidu (外白渡), the name given to the wooden bridge erected by the Shanghai Municipal Council in 1873. According to one source, "The upper stream of any river was called li (裡; internal, inside); the lower stream was called "wai"." Xue Liyong (薛理勇), indicates in his book on the history of the Bund:

In several instances, the Chinese used the terms li 裡 (internal) and wai 外 (external) to denote varying degrees of proximity of a location. An intermediate degree was indicated by zhong 中 (middle) for places situated between these two extremes. Several place names in Shanghai still reflect this practice. The Chinese name of the Garden Bridge – waibaidu qiao 外白渡橋 – is such a case. The name makes sense only in relation with another bridge called libaidu qiao 裡白渡橋 that was located further inside the Soochow Creek, whereas the Garden Bridge was located at the mouth of the creek where it merges into the Huangpu river.

Another source indicates that in Shanghainese, waibaidu means passing through the bridge without paying. Because there was no longer any toll collected to cross the bridge, it began to be called Waibaidu, but "whereas the old name meant 'foreigners/outer ferry crossing bridge' the character bai was changed to a homophonic that altered the meaning to 'outer free crossing bridge'".

== History ==
Before bridges were built over the Suzhou Creek (then known as the Wusong River), citizens had to use one of three ferry crossings: one near Zhapu Road, one at Jiangxi Road, and one near the mouth of the Suzhou River. These crossings (du in Chinese) were the only way to ford the river, until the construction of a sluice gate built in the Ming dynasty, later known as "Old Sluice", where the current Fujian Road bridge is located. During the Qing dynasty, another sluice bridge ("New Sluice") was constructed during the reign of the Yongzheng Emperor (1723–1735), near the location of today's Datong Road bridge.

With Shanghai becoming an international trade port through the Treaty of Nanjing in 1842, and foreign powers being granted concessions in the city, traffic between both sides of Suzhou River soared in the 1850s, increasing the need for a bridge close to the mouth of the river.

=== Wills' Bridge (1856-1871) ===
In October 1856, a British businessman named Charles Wills, of the firm of Jardine, Matheson, and American Edward Cunningham (1823–1889), the "brilliant though somewhat impetuous" managing director of Russell & Co., Vice-Consul for the United States (1853) and also consul of the Consul of Sweden and Norway in Shanghai, with the finances provided by a consortium of twenty investors, called the Soochow Creek Bridge Company, the first company in China focusing mainly on bridge construction, constructed the first foreign bridge across the Suzhou Creek, at the location of the outermost ferry crossing to ease traffic between the British Settlement to the south, and the American Settlement to the north of Suzhou River. Built to replace a Chinese bridge that had collapsed in 1855, and "that the Chinese were unable to reconstruct", this new bridge, which soon became known as Wills' Bridge, was made entirely of wood, and "had a total length of 137.16 metres (450 feet) and width of 7.01 metres (23 feet)". It had a "draw" on the Hongkou side to allow larger boats to enter or exit Suzou Creek. According to Francis Pott, it was "not a very sightly structure."

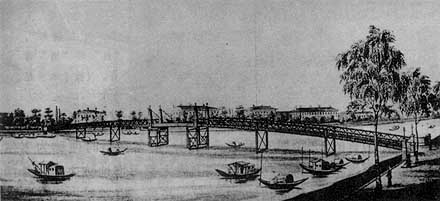
Wills' Bridge

Wills brought capital into China and invested in infrastructure that benefited Chinese and foreigner alike. He invested $12,000 in the 450-foot span (complete with drawbridge), and naturally charged a crossing fee. According to Henriot, "The investment made was to be repaid by a fee charged on all vehicles and passers-by at a rate of 5 taels per year for a horse-cart and one tael for a pedestrian". "The bridge was open to anyone who could pay the small toll, a 'thing hateful to the Shanghai public.'" Both Chinese and foreigners paid this toll, but as with many goods and services in Shanghai, foreigners paid on credit – thus the impression on the part of many Chinese that foreigners passed free." In 1863, when the British and American Settlements merged, the rate was doubled, causing serious protests by the Chinese population. The local population regarded Wills' toll policy as yet another of many restrictions for Chinese people by foreign powers. They responded with protest and boycotted the bridge, and Cantonese merchants opened new ferry services across Soochow Creek." Zhan Re, from Guangdong, established a free ferry near today's Shanxi Road intersection. One letter to the editor of the Shenbao newspaper in 1872, expressed outrage that the Chinese had to pay a toll to cross Wills' bridge while foreigners were exempted. Another suggests that the owner of the bridge is certainly "one conversant with profit". According to Barbara Mittler, "This turned out to be untrue, however: the Municipal Council was paying a yearly fee to Wills for foreign users." According to Pott, "The company made a great profit from the tolls collected from those using the bridge, and claimed it had received a charter from the Taotai (Chinese:道台 pinyin: daotai) giving it a right to this monopoly for 25 years. The public, however, protested, and denied the authority of the Taotai to grant any such charter." Wills soon became a wealthy person, but died on 9 September 1857 at sea on board the P&O steamer Bengal.

By 1870, Wills' bridge was quite worn out. The Shanghai Municipal Council instructed the owners to repair it, but it was ignored. "In the end the Municipal Council stepped in, built another bridge a dozen paces from Mr Wills's, and allowed everyone to traverse it for free."

=== The 2nd Wills' Bridge (1871-1873) ===
With profits for the wooden bridge decreasing, the Soochow Creek Bridge Company decided to build a new bridge. According to Pott, "When the company attempted the erection of a new iron bridge in 1871, two poles gave way and the part of the bridge that had been completed sank into the river."

=== Soochow Creek Bridge (Garden Bridge) (1873-1907) ===
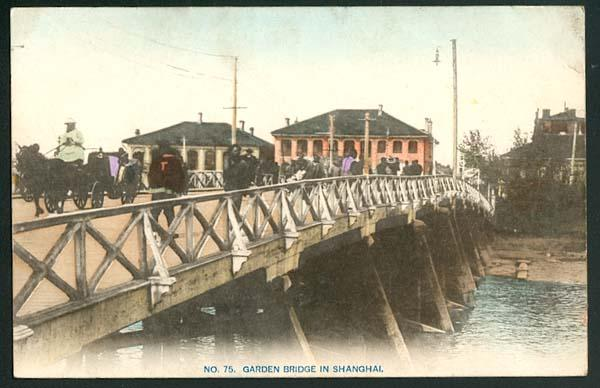
Wooden Garden Bridge.

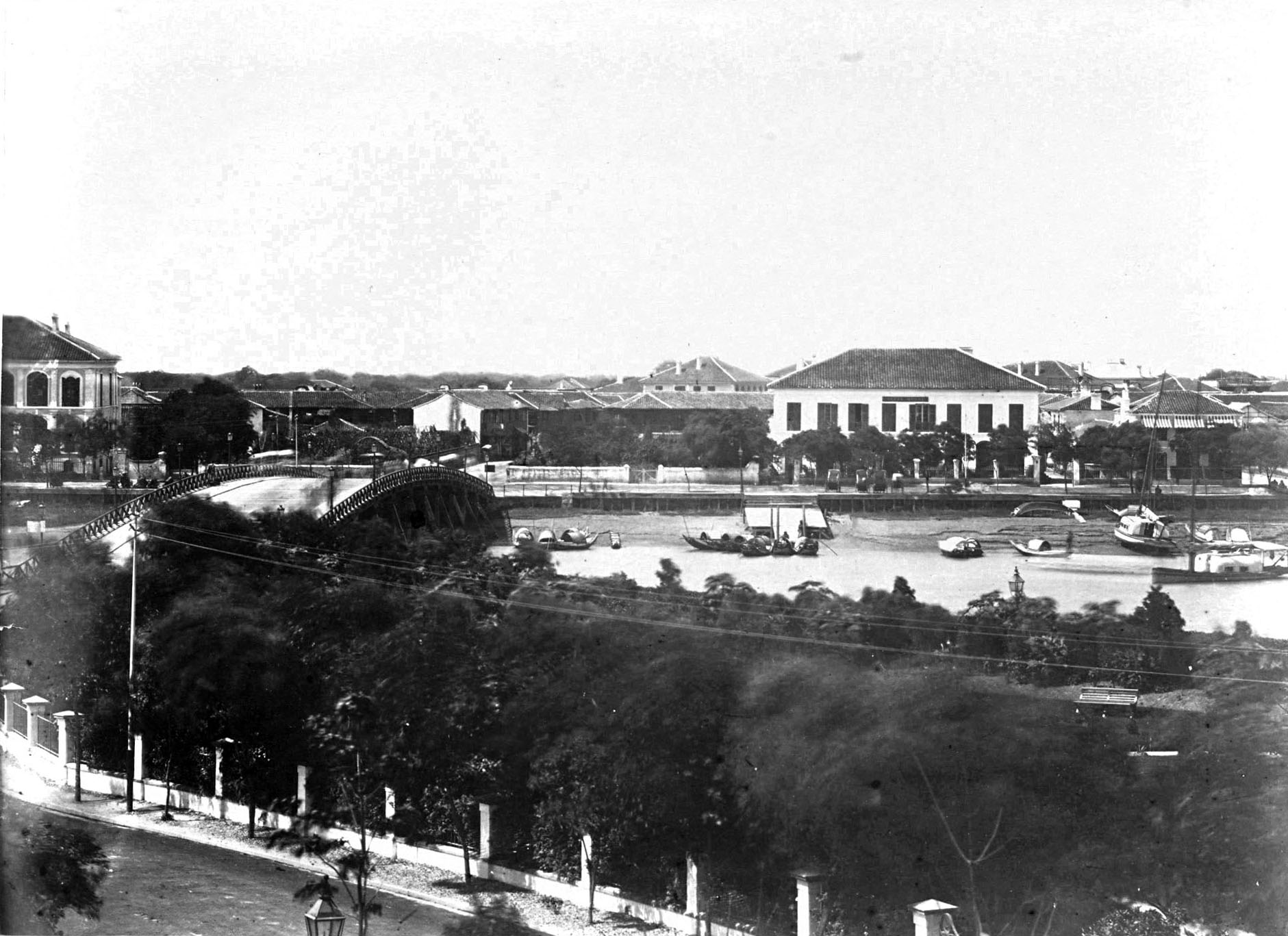
Garden Bridge & Astor House on the Hong Que Side, Shanghai

The Shanghai Municipal Council resolved the situation by approving the construction of a new wooden floating bridge, several metres west of Wills' original wooden bridge, to be opened to the public in September 1873. The Soochow Creek Bridge was built by S.C. Farnham & Co. at a cost of 19,513 taels (exclusive of the stone abutments). The new bridge was opened to traffic on 2 August 1873.

In October 1873, the Shanghai Municipal Council bought out the owners of the Wills' bridge and eliminated the toll. Thus should have ended the errant complaints of discrimination against locals. Indeed, complaints might have been aimed in the opposite direction. "Wills' bridge was destroyed, and a new bridge was constructed. It built a new bridge that was completed in August 1876. Its size was slightly bigger: 110.30 metres (385 feet) long and 12.19 metres (40 feet) wide, with walkways on each side (2.13 metres). The bridge has cost 12,900 taels. The second bridge remained in place until 1906."

==== Repairs (1881) ====
The first extensive repairs to the bridge were made in 1881, with 4,012 taels spent on re-planking the roadway and footpaths.

Sometime after the Public Garden at the northern end of the Bund opened in 1886, and due to its proximity, the Waibaidu bridge was also called the "Garden Bridge" in English.

Colloquially, the bridge was also known as the 'Beggars' Bridge" or "Bridge of Sighs" by 1873, because "here may be seen the most abject poverty and human misery, – sights pitiful enough to draw tears from the eyes of the gorgeous granite-stone dragons who watch the passing, living stream of human wretchedness. The deformed, the leprous, the blind, and the most hideous and disgusting semblance of humanity squat in rows and knots along the sides" of this bridge.

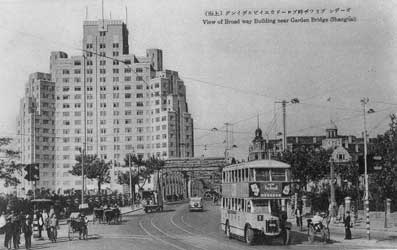
View to Hongkou.

=== 2nd Waibaidu bridge (1907 to today) ===
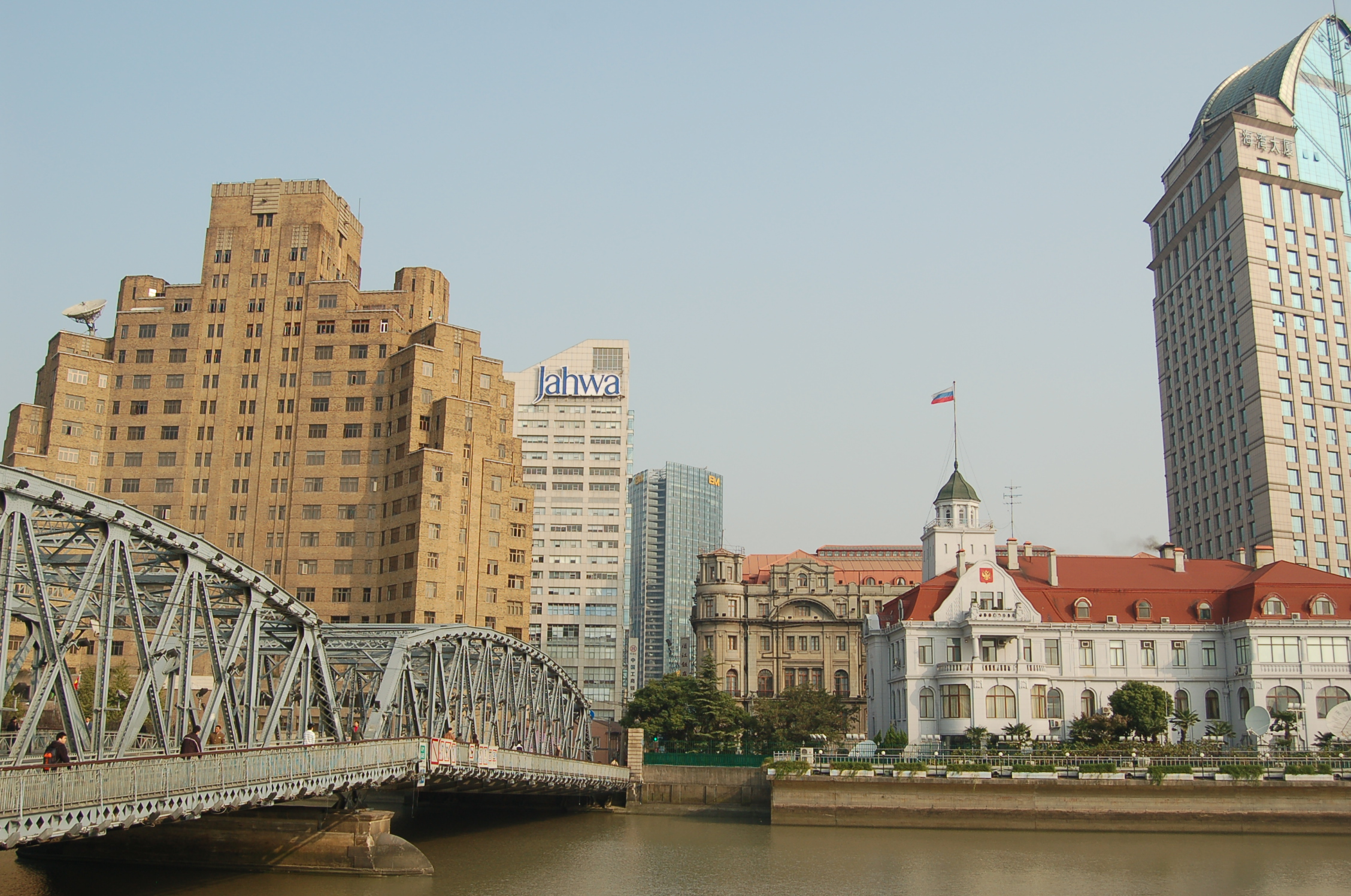
The Garden Bridge, the Broadway Mansion Hotel Shanghai, and the Russian Consulate.

The wooden Garden Bridge was demolished in 1906 and a new steel bridge was constructed to accommodate both trams and automobiles. This bridge was built under the supervision of the Shanghai Municipal Council, and imported the steel from England. This second "Waibaidu Bridge" ("Garden Bridge"), was designed by the British firm Howarth Erskine Ltd. of Singapore. The Cleveland Bridge & Engineering Company Co. Ltd. of Darlington, County Durham, England, who had built the Victoria Falls Bridge over the Zambezi River in Rhodesia the previous year, were responsible for building the bridge, which started on 4 August 1906. The bridge was completed on 29 December 1907. When it was opened on 20 January 1908, "it was the most substantial structure in China." It was the largest steel bridge in Shanghai and was the first steel truss bridge to be built in China, and is the only surviving example of a camelback truss bridge in the country. The bridge had a "total length was 104.39 metres, with 11.20 metres for vehicles and 2.9 metres on each side for pedestrians. The space between the bridge and the river reached a maximum of 5.57 metres at low ebb and 3.25 metres at high ebb." The bridge weighed 900 tons.

According to Cranley, "The local governor (taotai in Wade–Giles) declined the SMC's request for Chinese government investment in the construction of the new Garden Bridge, which replaced Wills Bridge in 1907. So residents of the Chinese municipality enjoyed free crossing of the Suzhou Creek from the 1870s thanks to the ratepayers of the International Settlement (a majority of whom were wealthy Chinese, who were taxed but did not have the right to representation on the SMC until the 1920s)."

==== Assassination of the Governor of Shanghai (1915) ====
At noon on 10 November 1915 Admiral Tseng Ju Cheng (鄭汝成), governor of Shanghai district loyal to the Beiyang government, was assassinated on the Garden Bridge en route to the Japanese consulate, with a bomb thrown by Wang Mingshan (王明山), and eighteen shots fired by Wang Xiaofeng (王晓峰), another anti-monarchist revolutionary, using two Mauser automatic pistols. Revolutionary general Chen Qimei (陳其美), who was loyal to Sun Yat-sen, commanded the operation.

==== First Shanghai Incident (1932) ====
The shelling of the Zhabei District during the Shanghai Incident on 28 January 1932 resulted in over 600,000 Chinese refugees attempting to cross the Garden Bridge into the International Settlement. The Japanese military restricted access to the bridge for several weeks. By 20 February 1932, the approaches to "the garden bridge into the foreign settlement again [was] glutted with a human" tide of those "writhing this morning with the torch of war against her breast". Many White Russian female refugees became prostitutes in Shanghai. The final (or lowest) stage for a courtesan was known as "walking the Garden Bridge", as it involved soliciting on the bridge.

==== Second Sino-Japanese War (1937-1945) ====
During the Battle of Shanghai, the Waibaidu bridge had an important role. On 12 August 1937, thousands of refugees, "a milling mass of humanity", from Greater Shanghai streamed into the foreign settlements through the Garden Bridge to escape the Japanese. Journalist Rhodes Farmer recorded:

Word had been passed back that barbed wire and Japanese sentries blocked all the approaches to Shanghai save Garden Bridge and the twenty-foot wide crossing that led to it over the stinking, garbage-filled [Suzhou] Creek. The mid-day sun scorched down pitilessly, for it was still the season of tahsu — the Great Heat ...the mass pressed on at snail's pace toward what was becoming the bridge of life."

At the end of August 1937, the Japanese military restricted foreigners from crossing the Garden Bridge: "There is much local criticism of the Japanese naval authorities who, still persist in their refusals to permit foreigners to cross the Garden Bridge." After August 1937 the Waibaidu Bridge was the de facto border between the International Settlement and Japanese occupied Hongkew (now Hongkou) and Zhabei. As Mark Gayn recalls: "The creek became the boundary between two worlds. To the north was the world of fear, death, and the Japanese bayonet. To the south, law was still supreme and life remained as normal as it could be with bombs exploding....Of all the bridges, the Garden Bridge alone remained open to traffic, and on its narrow roadway the two hostile worlds met and glared at each other.", The west end of Garden Bridge, was guarded by members of the Shanghai Volunteer Corps. Harold Rattenbury recalls: "Japanese and Scottish sentries face one another on the Garden Bridge. To the Japanese all Chinese must remove their hats; so I took pleasure in removing mine to our Scottish sentries also." Kemp Tolley indicates:

"A Japanese sentry stood on the Garden Bridge, over odoriferous Soochow Creek, which separated Honkew from the rest of the International Settlement. Foreigners were expected, on pain of a possible slap in the face, to bow gently from the waist when passing the sentry. Chinese coolies grunted, groaned and yei-hoed, pushing heavily loaded carts up the bridge's steep approaches. An occasional bayonet thrust into a bale or a prick in some tender part of a coolie's anatomy reminded everyone who was boss. Although Honkew was a part of the International Settlement, the Settlement taxis and rickshaws were not allowed there. One had to hire a ramshackle vehicle especially licensed — or walk across the bridge, bowing en route, and pick up a conveyance in Japanese "territory."

Rickshaws were not permitted to pass the Japanese sentries on the Garden Bridge. Japanese soldiers on both sides of the bridge would stop any Chinese, humiliate them and punish them if they had not shown proper respect. Foreigners were also expected to bow to the Japanese sentries, with some men and women forced to strip to the waist. Rena Krasno, a Jewish refugee remembered: "Everyone crossing the Garden Bridge is compelled to remove their hat and bow....The tram halted in front of the Japanese guards, all the passengers bowed and the bayonet-clasping soldiers waved us on with their free hand." For the Japanese, "the sentry was the personification of the glory and power of the Japanese army, and woe befall those who did not pay proper respect to him." According to Clark Lee, the sentries "considered themselves representatives of Emperor Hirohito, and many foreigners had been slapped or clubbed for 'disrespectfully' smoking in front of Imperial Representatives." In August 1937 Admiral Harry E. Yarnell, Commander-in-Chief of the US Asiatic Fleet, was "deliberately and grossly insulted by Japanese naval sentries on the Garden bridge." On 27 December 1937 Japanese authorities announced that foreigners would be permitted to cross the Garden Bridge without passes.

In late February 1938, the garrison commander of the Japanese Expeditionary Forces in China released a list of regulations and inducements to encourage foreigners to return to the Hongkou District to live, shop or do business: "Foreigners returning to districts North of the Creek are especially requested to respect the sentry on point duty at the Garden Bridge and at street corners by giving him a gentle bow, and wishing him 'GOOD MORNING.' Foreigners must realize that the Japanese soldier doing such duty represents the EMPEROR OF JAPAN." In June 1938 an American physician Dr J.C. Thompson was slapped by Japanese sentries on the Garden Bridge. In early July 1938 bombs were thrown at a Japanese sentry post on the Garden Bridge as part of a co-ordinated attack by Chinese resistance fighters on Japanese businesses. From 20 July 1938, the bridge was again referred to as "The Bridge of Sighs", as a result of handing Jiang Haisheng, a nineteen-year-old student who had been apprehended with a grenade in the International Settlement, to Japanese military authorities at the Garden Bridge. Later that month Miss Dorothea Lintihac was "rough housed" by Japanese sentries because she and her mother crossed the Garden Bridge on the wrong side of the street to avoid both dangerous traffic and barbwire entanglements. Subsequently, they were arrested and detained later. The British Consul General Herbert Phillips protested the incident and the "increasingly belligerent attitude" of the Japanese sentries.

In the early hours of 8 December 1941, as Pearl Harbor was being attacked, the International Settlement was occupied by Japanese military forces. Now that "they controlled all of Shanghai, the Japanese removed the hut on the Garden Bridge that used to mark the border between Hongkew and the International Settlement." Additionally, "there was now a barrier at the Garden Bridge over the Soochow Creek, sealing off the Japanese quarter from the rest of the Settlement. Barbed-wire barricades were set up throughout the city, and Japanese sentries posted at all bridges." An American resident, Edna Lee Booker, recalls: "The arrogance and possessiveness of the Japanese began at the top with the Gendarmerie and the inquisitors, and carried down. The Garden Bridge, which leads north into Hongkew, was the scene of many slappings and strikings and jabbings by the Japanese guards."

==== Repairs (1947) ====
Since the 1940s, the Waibaidu Bridge has undergone four major repairs and reinforcements, including the most recent one in 1999. By 1947, after 40 years of service, the municipal government did a check that revealed weakness in the structure and a tendency to sink into the ground (12.7 cm since 1907). In June 1947, a private company was contracted to reinforce the structure and prevent further sinking. No other major work was done thereafter, except the widening of the walkways for pedestrians after 1949.

==== Repairs (1957) ====
In 1957 The Shanghai Municipal Council's Engineering Bureau, and the Municipal Engineering Design Institute, conducted an extensive examination to assess the condition of the bridge in its fiftieth year of use. Repairs were made and measures taken to conserve the aging bridge. The bridge was originally designed to last fifty years.

==== Repairs (1961-1965) ====
During 1961, it was necessary to repair damage to the asphalt surface of the road and remove rot damage on the bridge deck. In 1964, the bridge was removed to the shipyard for repairs, and the tramway permanently removed. In 1965, the wooden pedestrian sidewalks were replaced with new materials, the concrete columns were reinforced, tooth plate joints were installed, and the bridge repainted.

==== Cultural Revolution (1966-1976) ====
In 1967, during the Cultural Revolution, Neale Hunter, an Australian who lived in the Broadway Mansions for nine months, described the Garden Bridge as "an ugly tangle of bolted iron struts", while Red Guards renamed the bridge, "Anti-Imperialism Bridge".

In 1970, extensive sandblasting was conducted on all the steel components of the Waibaidu bridge to remove all rust. A rust-proof zinc spray was then added to the bridge, and the sidewalk railings repainted grey, while the side safety fences were painted white. In 1977, the Shanghai Municipal Design Institute examined and reinforced the beams of the bridge.

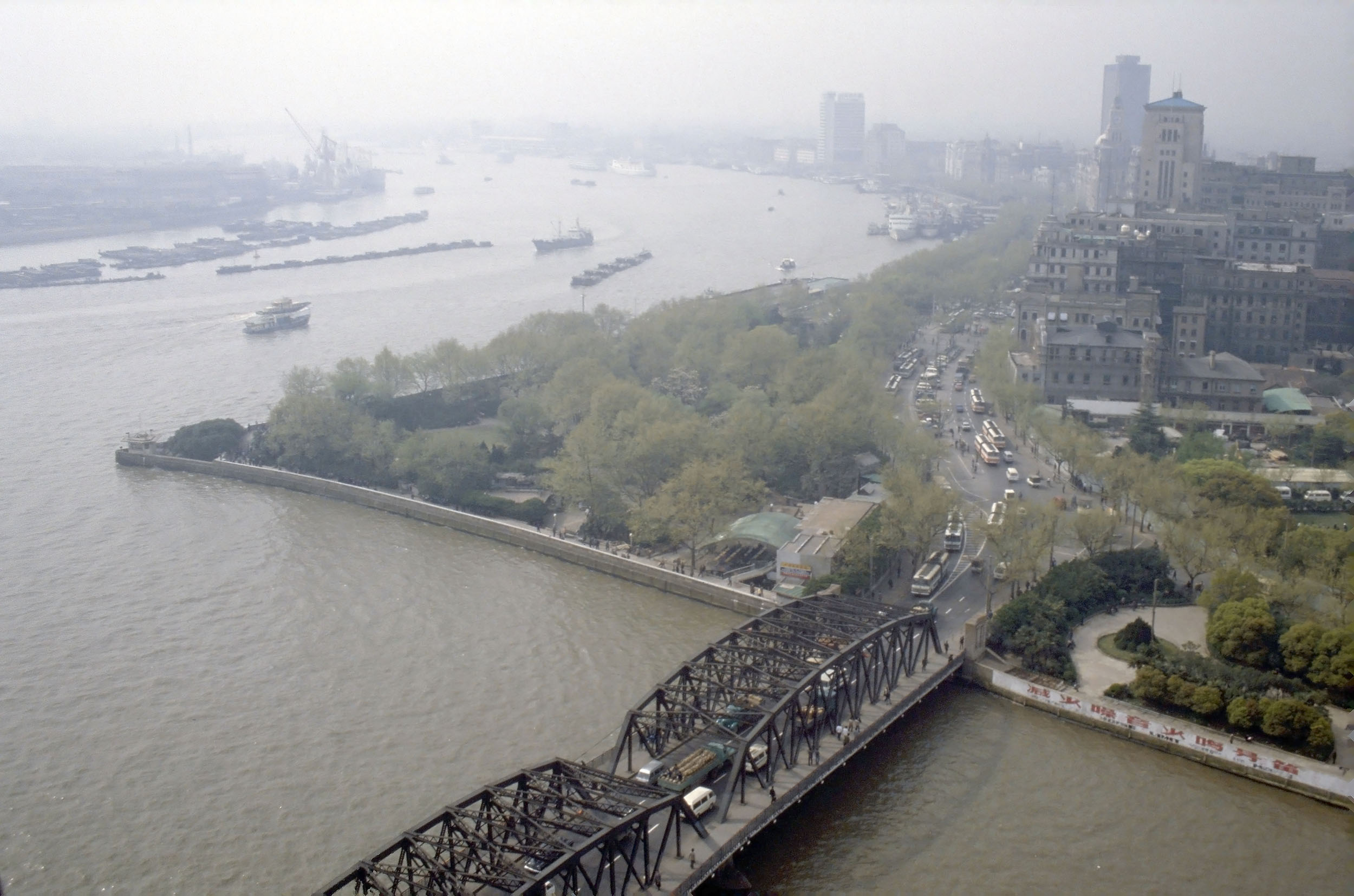
View to the Bund, 1987.

==== Highlights (1980-2007) ====
In 1985 all of the paint on the bridge was scraped off, and then the bridge was re-painted. In the 1980s to 1990s the traffic volume on the Bund increased dramatically, and the then 90-year-old Waibaidu Bridge could no longer cope. In 1991, the Wusong Floodgate Bridge, a new concrete road bridge was constructed to the west of Waibaidu Bridge, and the river crossing traffic was mainly diverted onto the new bridge. After the completion of the Bund reconfiguration project, the Wusong Floodgate Bridge will be rendered obsolete by a new tunnel and will be demolished.

==== Renovation (1991) ====
In 1991, the Shanghai Municipal Council had the Shanghai Railway Bureau assess the Waibaidu bridge. In July 1991, the Shanghai Shipyard completed an overhaul and restoration of the bridge. On 15 February 1994, the Shanghai Municipal Council declared the Waibaidu bridge as the city's most outstanding construction.

==== Renovation (1999) ====
In mid-1999, the 91-year-old bridge underwent a restoration project. Following the work, the bridge remains open to vehicular traffic and visitors to the city.

==== Centenary (2007) ====
In December 2007, the Waibaidu bridge celebrated its centenary.

==== Removal and restoration (2008) ====
As early as March 2007, it was decided to strengthen the Waibaidu bridge due to "concerns that construction of a nearby tunnel could damage the structure. Construction of the tunnel - known as the Bund passage project - was completed and re-opened to the public in early 2009. The piers along the steel truss Waibaidu Bridge will be upgraded following a complete inspection....City engineers have managed to track down the original blueprints, which were written in English." Part of the reason for the restoration project was "to make way for the construction of a huge two-level vehicle tunnel called the "Bund Passage" below the Bund, or Zhongshan Road E1, to alleviate ground traffic congestion." According to the Shanghai Daily newspaper in 2008, "Despite its 100 years of use, the bridge recently passed a quality test which showed it would have been safe to use for at least 30 years even without this major facelift." The restoration plan, whose key concept was "restoring and reinforcing the original style", was approved by the State Cultural Relic Bureau, with the stipulation that "the bridge's body above the lowest water level was kept intact".

On 29 February 2008, the Garden Bridge was closed to all traffic, in preparation for its removal. On 1 March 2008, as part of the Bund Refurbishment Project, an extensive reconfiguration of traffic flow along the Bund, and in preparation for World Expo 2010 to be held in Shanghai, Waibaidu Bridge was cut into two sections, detached from its abutments, and moved by boat into a shipyard in Pudong for extensive repairs and restoration. On 6 April 2008, the southern part of the bridge was removed and on 7 April 2008, the northern part was removed as well. The restoration work was undertaken by Shanghai Shipyards at its Minsheng Road docks in Pudong, and formally started on 5 April 2008. According to the project engineers,

Almost 160,000 rivets hold China's first steel bridge together. Once common practice in the construction industry, the use of rivets has been replaced by welding. Riveting, a dying art, is now only used on a small scale for building railway bridges and ships. Bridge repairers Shanghai Shipyard found and recruited nearly 60 riveters from two factories in Shanhaiguan of Hebei Province and Xi'an of Shaanxi Province and flew them to Shanghai. They worked in four-man groups, heating rivets to between 900 and 1,000 degrees Celsius before hammering them into the structure. "At night, it was like watching a meteor flying across the sky as one worker cast a heated rivet high and the other quickly took it with tools and hammered it on the bridge without a second's delay, a Shanghai Shipyard engineer said.

Ultimately, "some 63,000 steel rivets have been replaced - about 40% of the total." The Shanghai Morning Post reported that engineers found high sulfur content in the bridge after conducting tests on its structural integrity, necessitating the removal of the "rust, ... and aging structures strengthened during the repair". Repainting was another major task with all the rust and old paint removed from the bridge before new coats were applied. According to the project engineers, "There was a thick layer of old paint on the bridge, the result of many rounds of repainting during previous repairs. After it had all been removed, workers used anti-rust paint of the same silver-grey colour as before. Now, not only does the bridge look like new, but it has even more protection against rusting than before."

The restoration project required 205 tons of steel. Some of the original components will go on display at museums in Shanghai. Liu Yanbin, a member of the project team, indicated, "The iron handrails and the cement pavements have will be replaced with wooden ones, and the triangular truss will be replaced with an arc, as it was in 1907." Wooden sidewalks were restored on both sides of the bridge's vehicle lanes. Mao Anji, a project manager, indicated: "The roadways are to be paved after the bridge is moved back to the creek. We will replace the previous concretes with wooden materials to build the new sidewalks to bring back the bridge's original and old style." Additionally, "some triangle-shaped frames on the bridge's two arches have been replaced with curved ones to restore the original appearance. During previous repairs, workers used the triangle structures to replace the old ones because they were easier to create than those with a curve." According to the project engineers, "Compared to the bridge's main structure, its underwater section has been drastically altered. Workers removed nearly 800 wooden pillars that were sunk 11 meters into the river bed. Now the bridge's three piers will be sitting on 36 one-metre-wide concrete supports that are deeply-rooted to a depth of 67 metres under the bottom of the creek." The restored bridge stands on new concrete piles that are wider and deeper than the original wooden supports and is expected to have a safe lifespan of at least another 50 years.

==== Re-opening (2009) ====
The restored bridge was reopened to pedestrians on 8 April 2009. It was opened to vehicular traffic early in the morning of 11 April. According to the bridge's repairers, The bridge will "weigh more than 1,000 tons as the result of its 10-month repair and restoration program. It was the most in-depth restoration effort since Waibaidu Bridge was built in 1907."

One of the improvements was the installation of an LED lighting system on the bridge, which cycles through different colours, and was also designed to reduce electricity consumption and make the bridge more attractive at night.

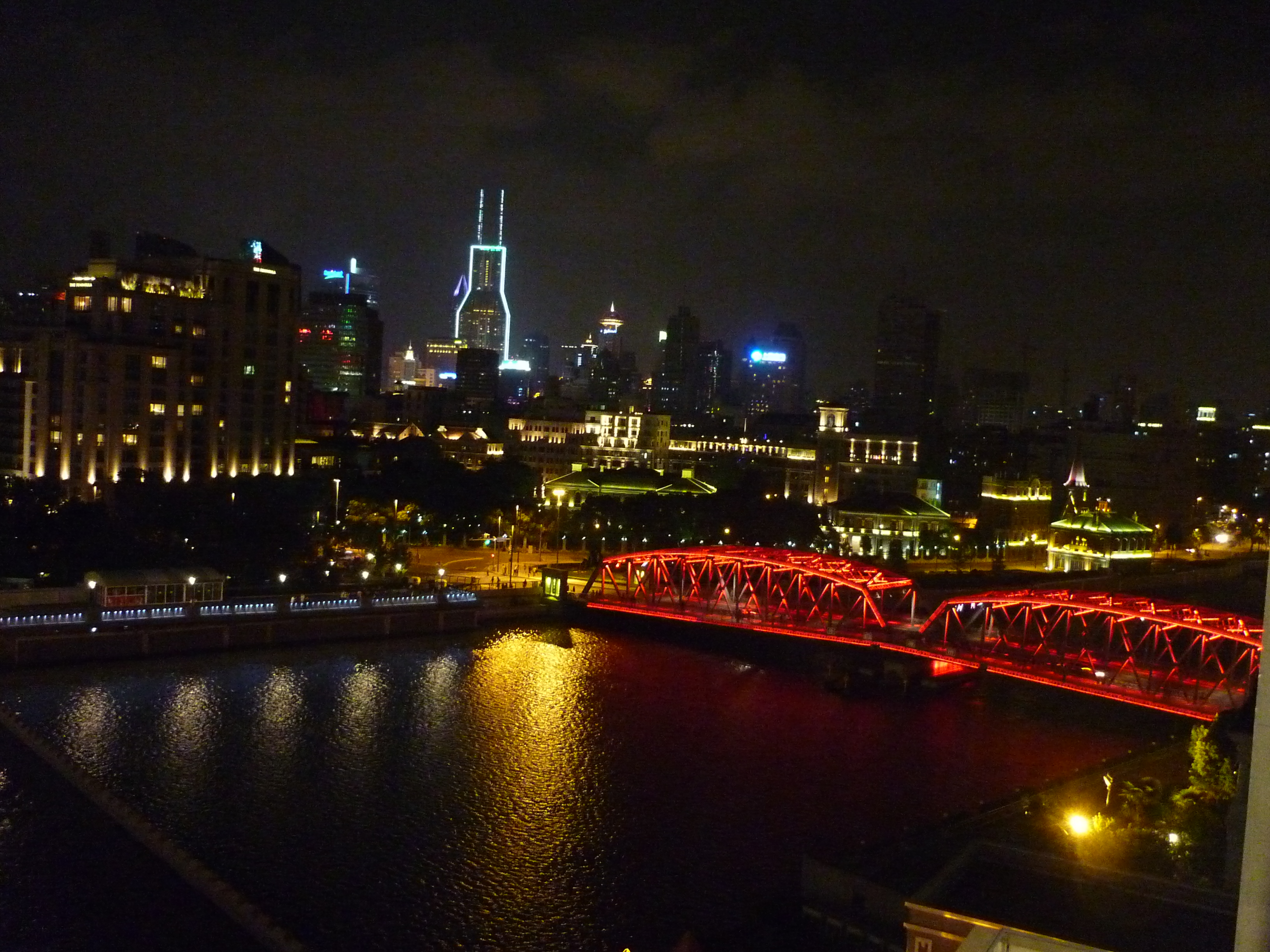

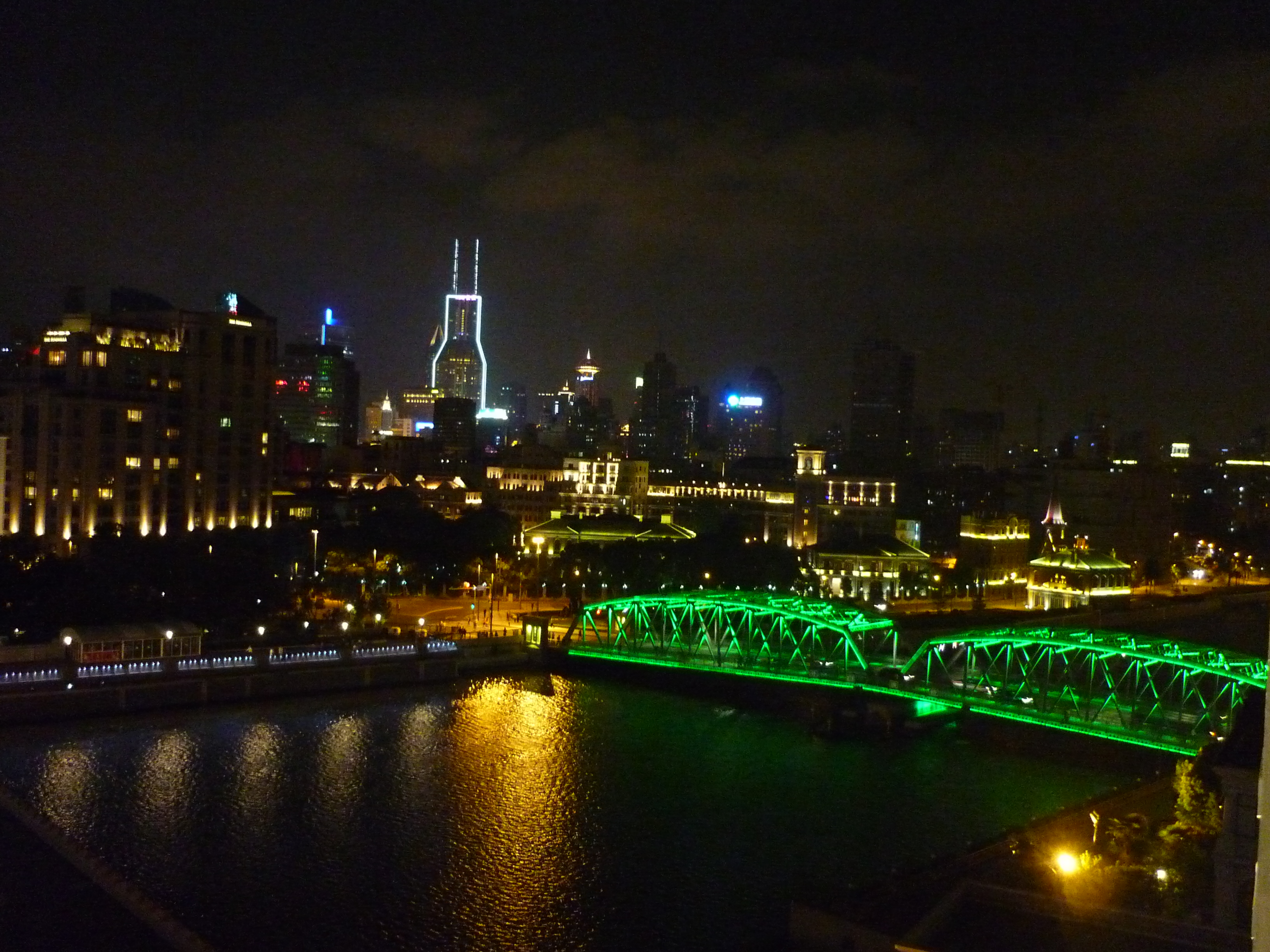

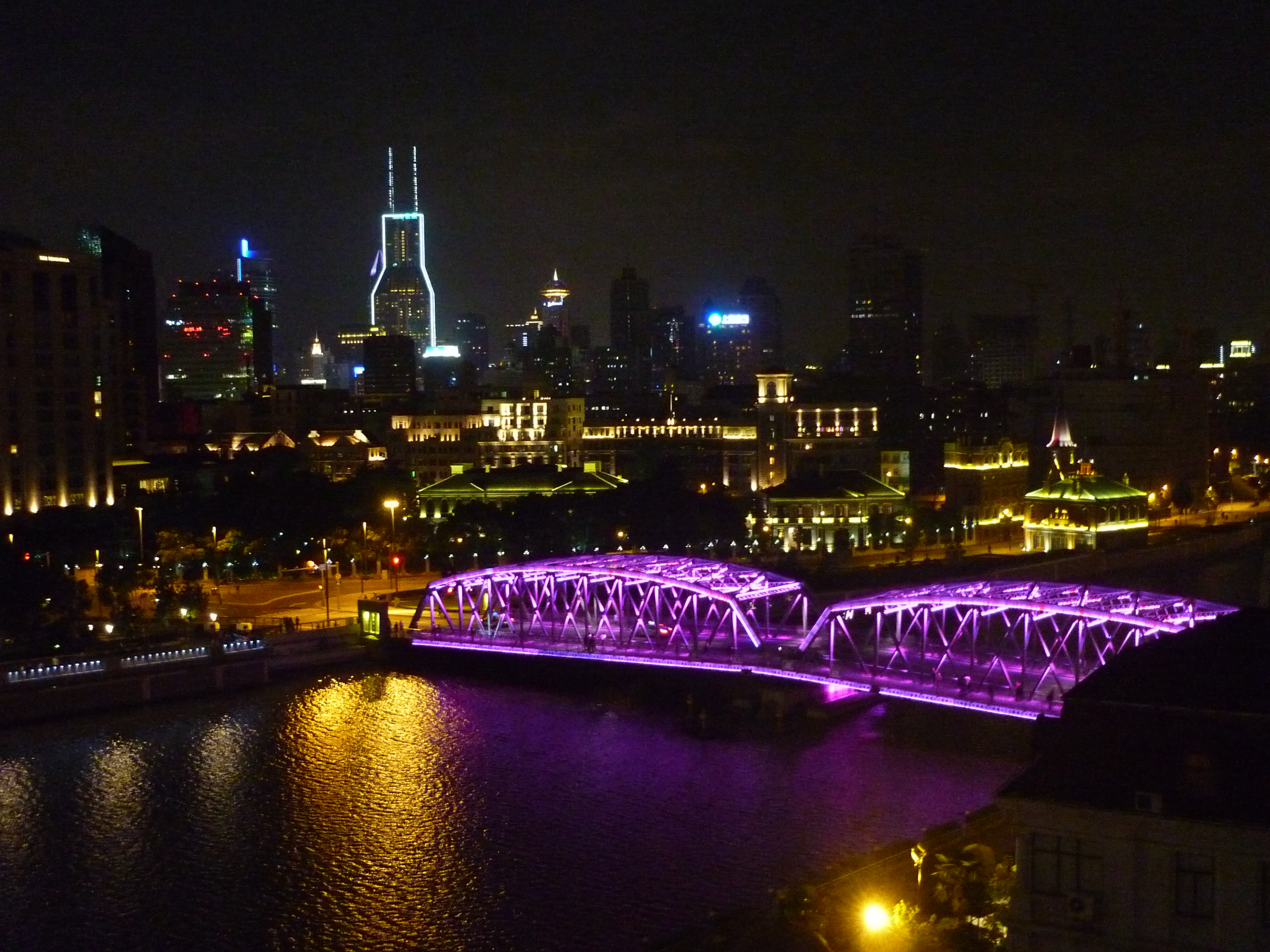

== In the media ==
=== Literature ===
The Waibaidu bridge has been featured in several novels, including:

- 1933 Mao Dun's Ziye (Midnight: A Romance of China in 1930, 1933), his first novel set entirely in Shanghai, opens with a naïve outsider crossing the Garden Bridge to enter Shanghai;
- 1958 Zhou Erfu's (Êrh-fu Chou) magnum opus, the four-volume Morning in Shanghai, which provides a detailed focus on Shanghai's industrial and commercial life from 1949 to 1958, described the deaths of "untold Chinese" on the Garden Bridge;
- 2003 In the novel Shanghai, author Donald Moore describes the Shanghai of 1939, and describes the actions of Japanese troops on the Garden Bridge and their mistreatment of Chinese people;
- 2004 Irish poet Paddy Bushe (born 1948) has written a poem "Crossing Waibaidu Bridge".

=== Films ===
According to film critic William Arnold, "Since colonial days, the focal point of the City of Shanghai has been the spot where the Garden Bridge crosses the meandering Suzhou Creek as it runs into the Huangpo River. It marks the northern boundary of the Shanghai Bund, and it's managed to pop up in practically every movie ever made about the city." The most recent Waibaidu Bridge has been featured in a number of films and literary works, including:

- 1980 The Bund (上海滩), a 25 episode television period drama set in 1920s Shanghai;
- 1987 Steven Spielberg's film Empire of the Sun shows Shanghai in 1941. In a scene reflecting the volatile atmosphere of these times, a British family can be seen passing the border post on Garden Bridge, around them the Chinese masses who are subject to the whim of the Japanese soldiers.
- 2000 While Lou Ye's film Suzhou River (Chinese: Suzhou he) mostly takes place west of Waibaidu Bridge, at the northern bank of present-day Suzhou Creek, the bridge can be seen in the final scene when the camera races towards Huangpu River and modern Pudong. "In "Suzhou River," a voluptuously romantic drama from China, it's once again the symbol of the city, and the spot where most of the action takes place";
- 2001–2002 Romance in the Rain, a Chinese drama television series produced by Taiwanese author Chiung Yao. The character Lu Yiping (陸依萍/陆依萍), played by Vicki Zhao Wei jumps off from the bridge into the Suzhou Creek;
- 2004 Dai sing siu si (Da cheng xiao shi) (Leaving Me, Loving You), a Hong Kong film set in Shanghai starring Faye Wong, shows a car on the Waibaidu bridge at dawn;
- 2006 Shanghai Rumba (Shanghai Lunba, 上海伦巴);
- 2007 Lust, Caution, a Chinese espionage thriller film directed by Taiwanese American director Ang Lee, based on the 1979 short story by Chinese author Eileen Chang. The Waibaidu bridge appears twice in the film the first time after 66 minutes, the other after 114 minutes;
- 2008 Gong Fu Guan Lan (大灌篮) (Kung Fu Dunk or Slam Dunk), features Jay Chou starting his journey on a bicycle on the Waibaidu bridge;

=== Television ===
- 2010 American series The Amazing Race 16 featured the bridge as a Route Marker with teams knowing the bridge only as the "Garden Bridge".

== Places nearby ==
Notable places close to Waibaidu Bridge include:

- The Bund
- Broadway Mansions
- Huangpu Park
- Astor House Hotel
- Russian Consulate
- Shanghai Mansions
