= Fuyou Street Merchandise Mart =

Shopping mall in Shanghai, China

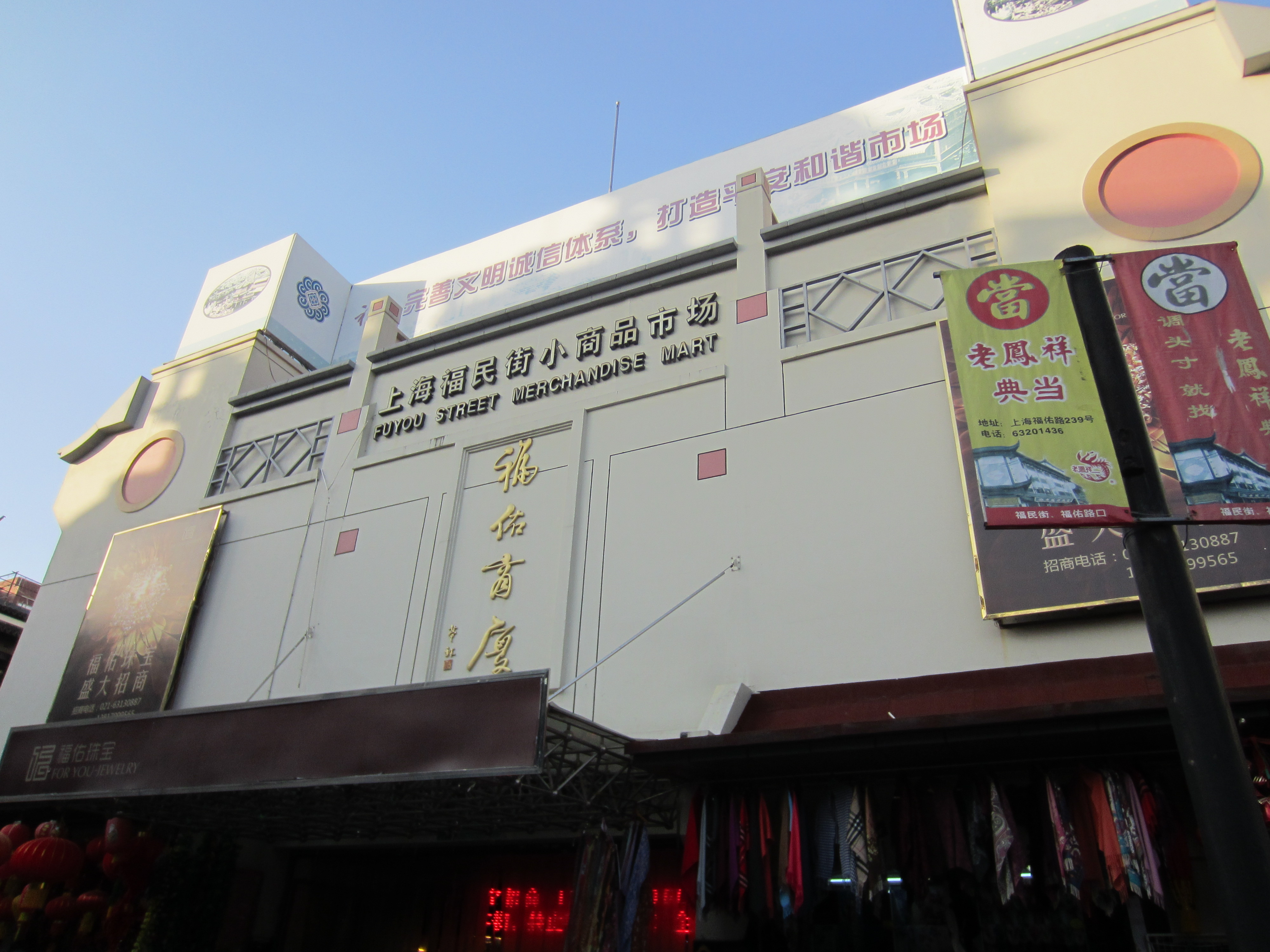
- The mart's exterior, 2015
- Location: Shanghai
- Address: 225 Fuyou Lu

Fuyou Street Merchandise Mart is a market located at 225 Fuyou Lu (福佑路225号) in Shanghai's Huangpu District, in China.
