= Xintiandi (disambiguation) =

Xintiandi (Chinese: 新天地; pinyin: Xīntiāndì; lit. 'New Heaven and Earth') is an affluent car-free shopping, eating and entertainment district of Shanghai.

Xintiandi may also refer to:

- Xintiandi Station, Shanghai
- Xintiandi, Chinese name of Shincheonji, a Korean new religious movement
- Suntendy Interactive Multimedia Co., Ltd. (北京新天地), multimedia and gaming company established in 1997
- Xintiandi, EP by Beyond (band)
