= Middle Huaihai Road station =

Shanghai Metro station

Middle Huaihai Road 淮海中路
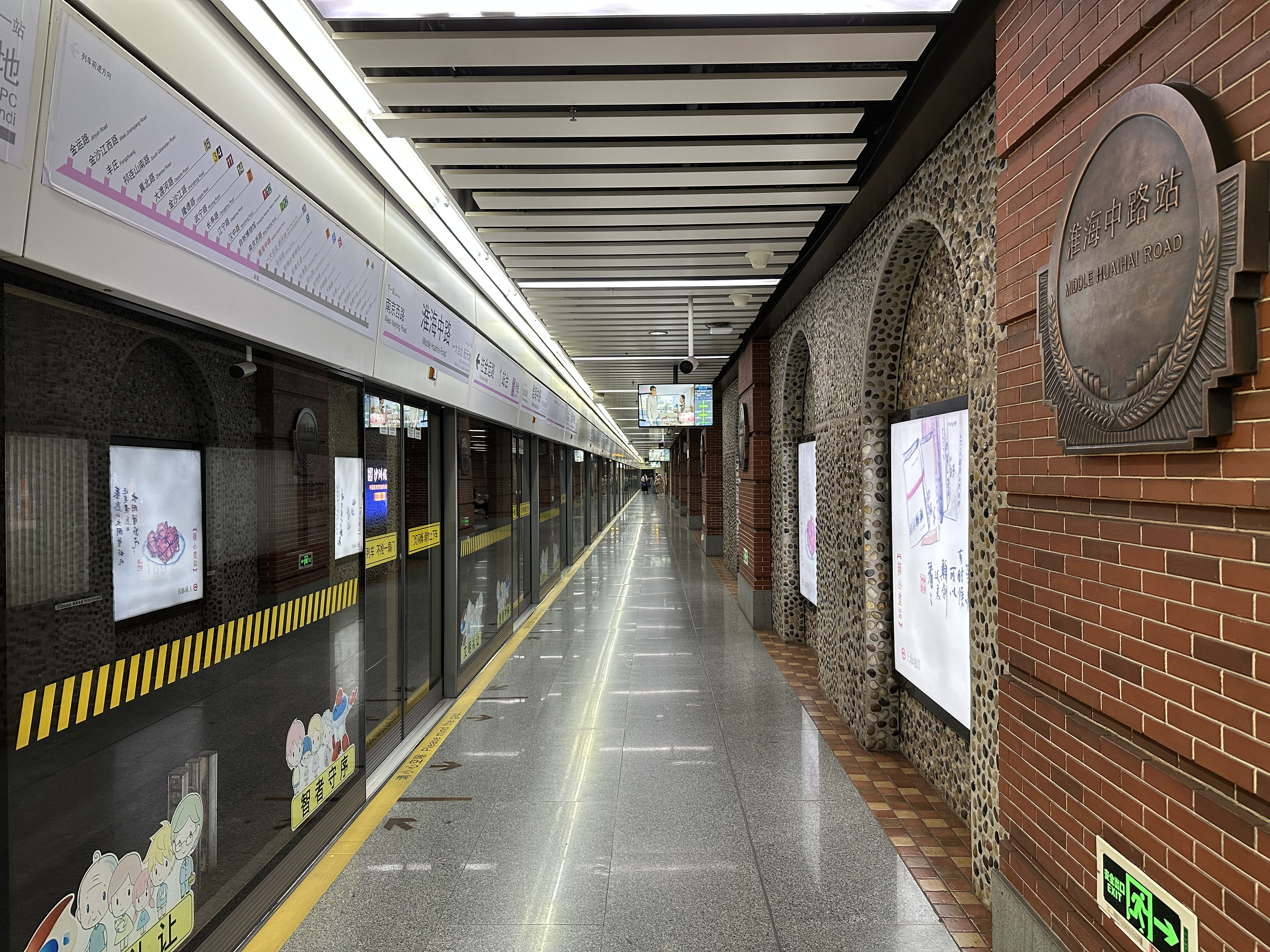
- Station platform

General information
- Location: Middle Huaihai Road; Huangpu District, Shanghai; China
- Coordinates: 31°13′19″N 121°27′35″E
- Line: Line 13
- Platforms: 2 (1 island platform)
- Tracks: 2

Construction
- Structure type: Underground
- Accessible: Yes

History
- Opened: December 19, 2015

Services
Preceding station	Shanghai Metro	Following station
West Nanjing Road towards Jinyun Road	Line 13	Site of the First CPC National Congress · Xintiandi towards Zhangjiang Road
Location
- Location within Shanghai

Middle Huaihai Road (Chinese: 淮海中路; pinyin: Huáihǎi Zhōng Lù) is a station on Line 13 of the Shanghai Metro. This station is located on Ruijin 1st Road (near Middle Huaihai Road). The station opened on December 19, 2015 as part of the extension to Line 13.

Lines 1 and 14 pass through without stopping. It is between South Shaanxi Road and Site of the First CPC National Congress · South Huangpi Road on Line 1, and between Jing'an Temple and South Huangpi Road on Line 14.
