= South Xizang Road station =

Shanghai Metro interchange station

South Xizang Road 西藏南路
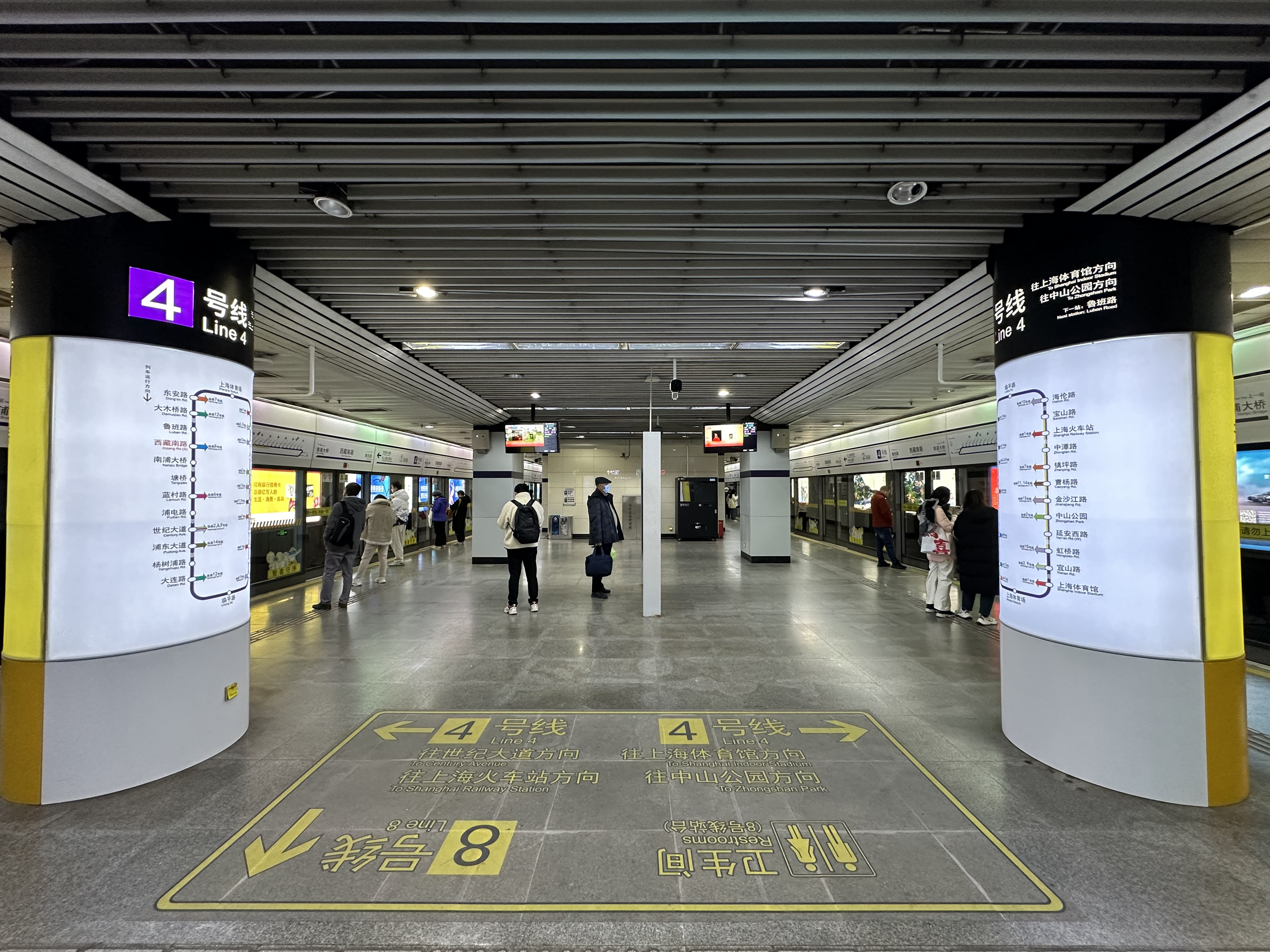
- Line 4 platform

General information
- Location: South Zhongshan Road and South Xizang Road; Huangpu District, Shanghai; China
- Coordinates: 31°12′07″N 121°29′22″E
- Operator: Shanghai No. 3/4 Metro Operation Co. Ltd.
- Lines: Line 4; Line 8
- Platforms: 4 (2 island platforms)
- Tracks: 4

Construction
- Structure type: Underground
- Accessible: Yes

History
- Opened: 29 December 2007; 18 years ago (Lines 4 and 8)

Services
Preceding station	Shanghai Metro	Following station
Luban Road Clockwise	Line 4	Nanpu Bridge Counter-clockwise
Lujiabang Road towards Shiguang Road	Line 8	China Art Museum towards Shendu Highway
Location
- Location within Shanghai

South Xizang Road (Chinese: 西藏南路; pinyin: Xīzàng Nán Lù) is the name of an interchange station between Line 4 and Line 8 of the Shanghai Metro. It began operation on both lines on 29 December 2007. On 22 October 2010 the station handled about 100,000 entries and exits. It is the first station in Huangpu District when travelling northbound on Line 8.

== Station Layout ==
G	Entrances and Exits	Exits 1-5
B1	Concourse	Faregates, Station Agent
B2	Northbound	← Line 8 towards Shiguang Road (Lujiabang Road)
B2	Island platform, doors open on the left
B2	Southbound	Line 8 towards Shendu Highway (China Art Museum) →
B3	Clockwise	← Line 4 to Luban Road
B3	Island platform, doors open on the left
B3	Counterclockwise	Line 4 to Nanpu Bridge →

== Places nearby ==
- Expo 2010
- Power Station of Art

== Gallery ==
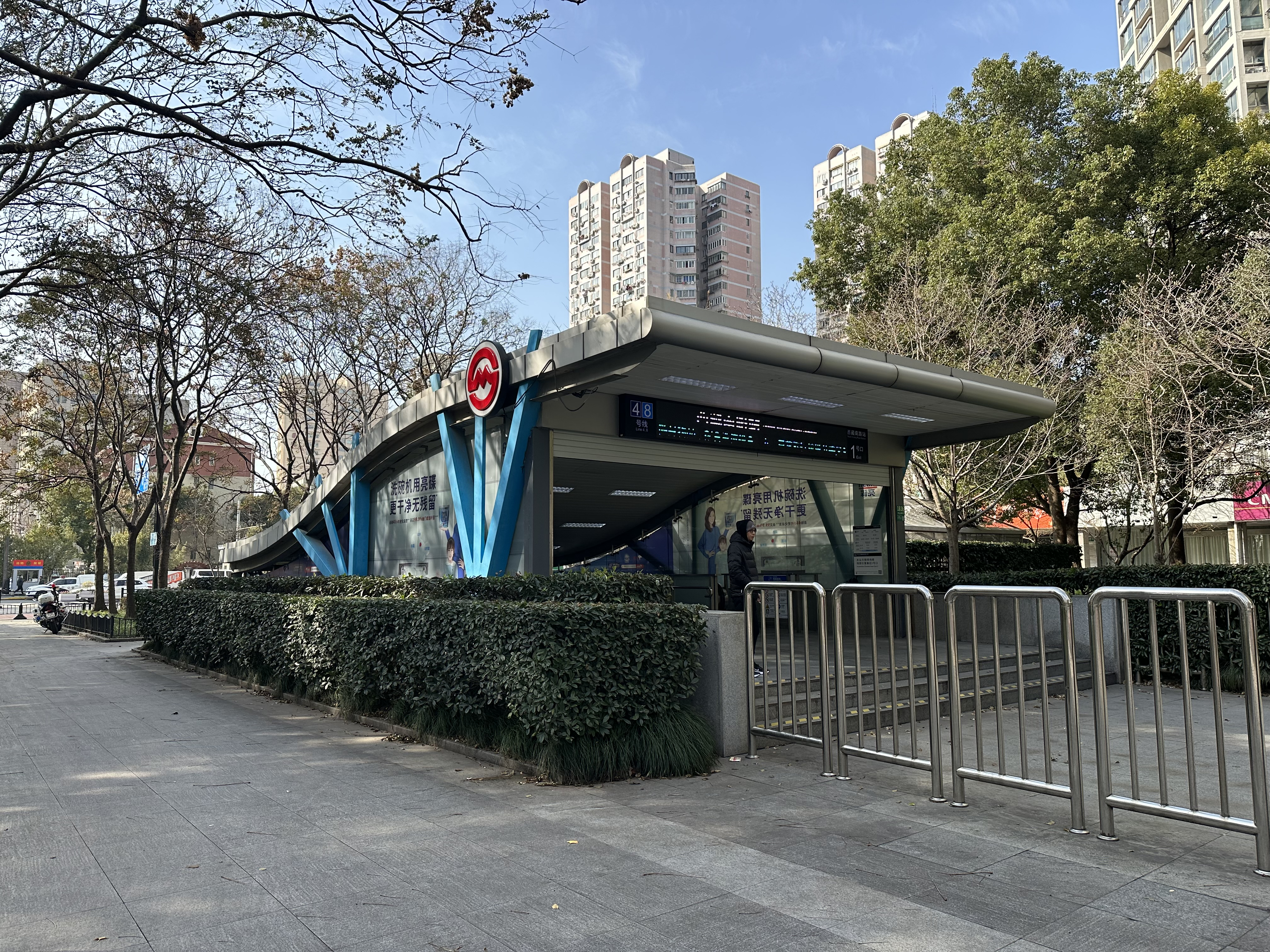
Exit 1

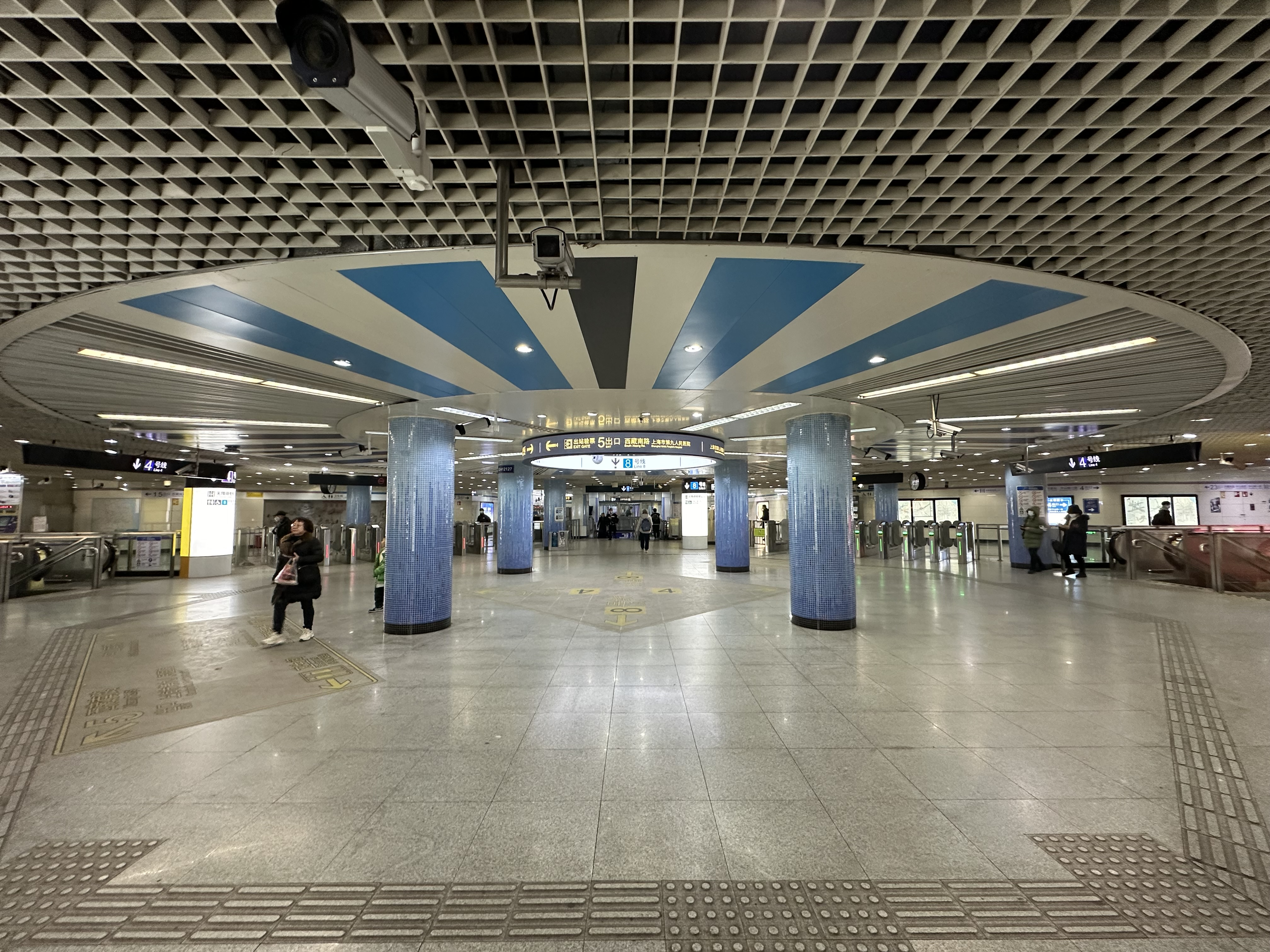
Concourse

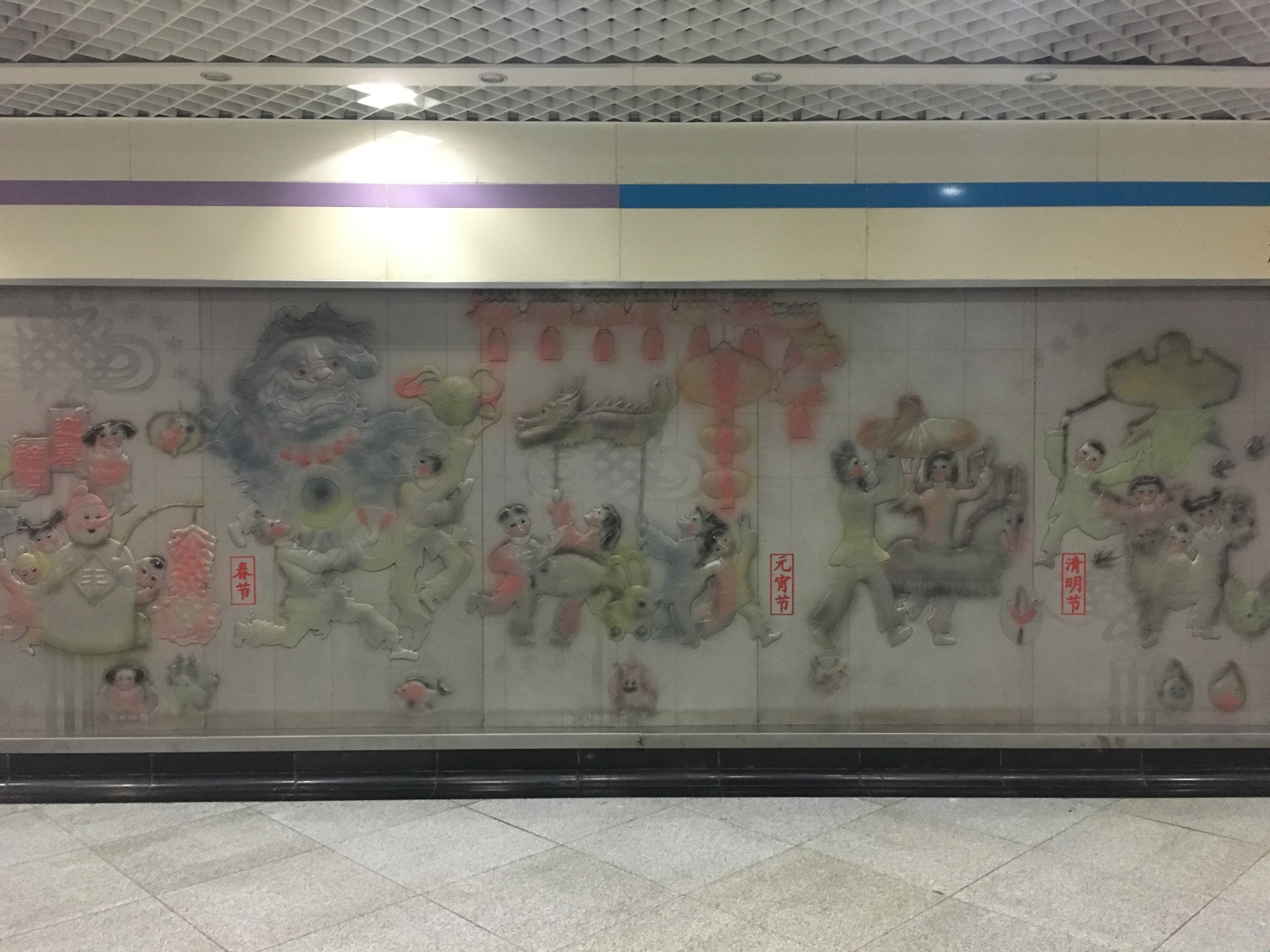
Mural

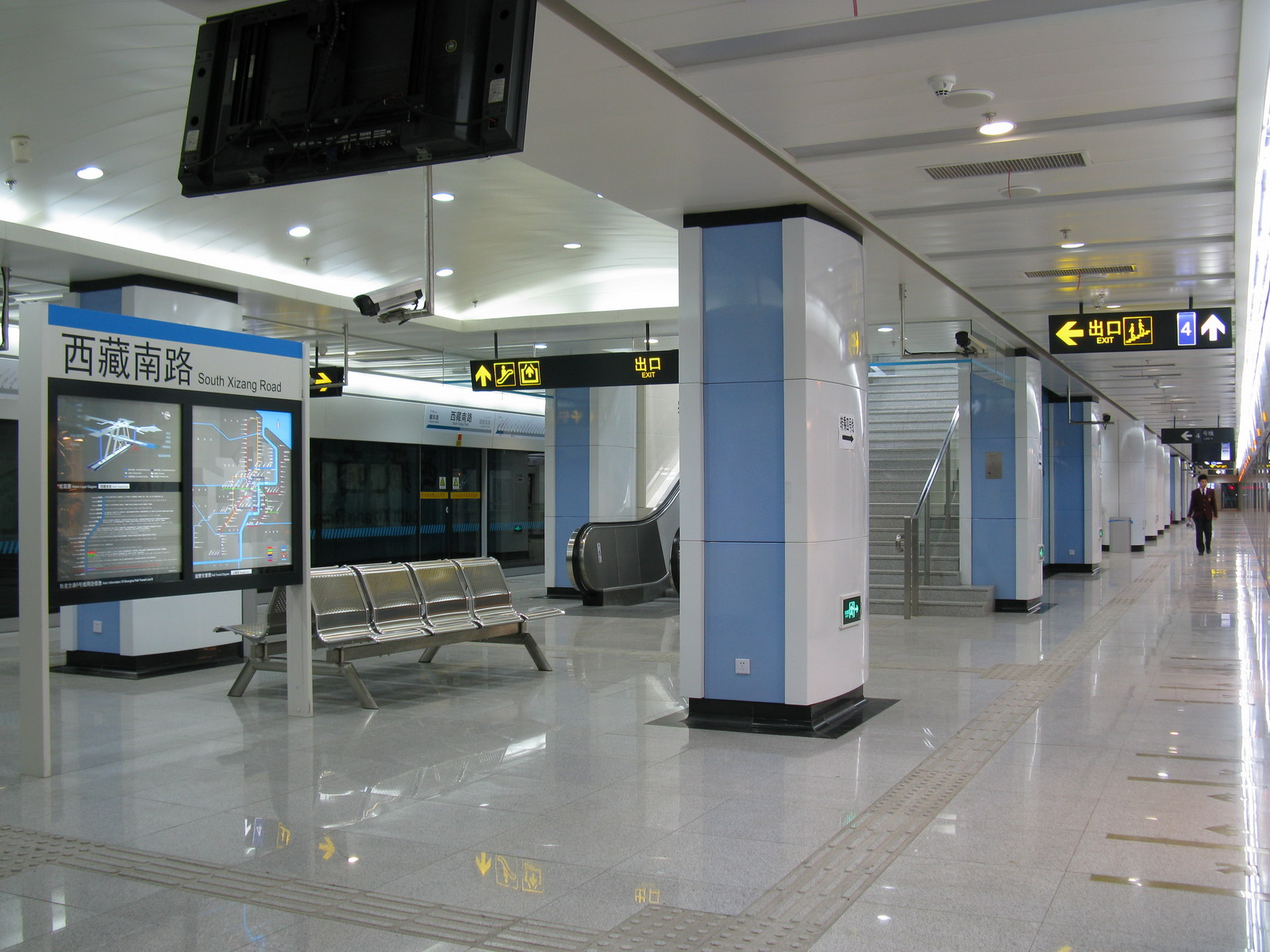
Line 8 platform
