= Nanpu Bridge station =

Shanghai Metro station

Nanpu Bridge 南浦大桥
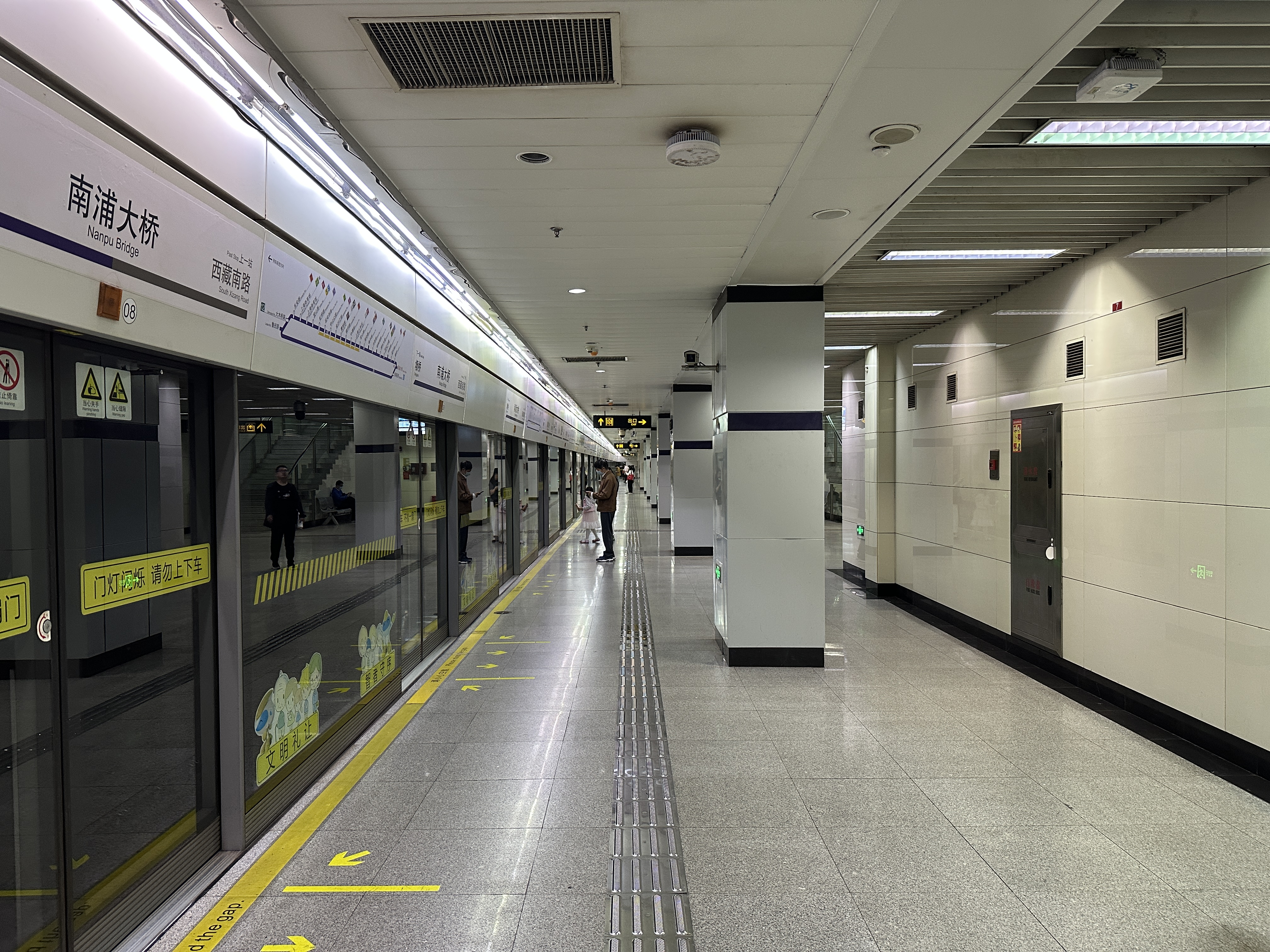
- Station platform

General information
- Location: South Zhongshan Road and Lujiabang Road; Huangpu District, Shanghai; China
- Coordinates: 31°12′31″N 121°29′59″E
- Operator: Shanghai No. 3 Metro Operation Co. Ltd.
- Line: Line 4
- Platforms: 2 (1 split platform)
- Tracks: 2

Construction
- Structure type: Underground
- Accessible: Yes

History
- Opened: 29 December 2007; 18 years ago

Services
Preceding station	Shanghai Metro	Following station
South Xizang Road Clockwise	Line 4	Tangqiao Counter-clockwise
Location
- Location within Shanghai

Nanpu Bridge (simplified Chinese: 南浦大桥; traditional Chinese: 南浦大橋; pinyin: Nánpǔ Dàqiáo) is a station on Shanghai Metro Line 4. It is named after and located near the western end of the Nanpu Bridge in Huangpu District, and is the first station in Puxi when travelling clockwise after crossing the Huangpu River from Pudong. Service began at this station on 29 December 2007.

== Station Layout ==
G	Entrances and Exits	Exits 1-3
B1	Concourse	Faregates, Station Agent
B2	Clockwise	← Line 4 to South Xizang Road
B2	Side platform, doors open on the right
B3	Counterclockwise	Line 4 to Tangqiao →
B3	Side platform, doors open on the left
