= Dapuqiao station =

Shanghai Metro station

Dapuqiao 打浦桥
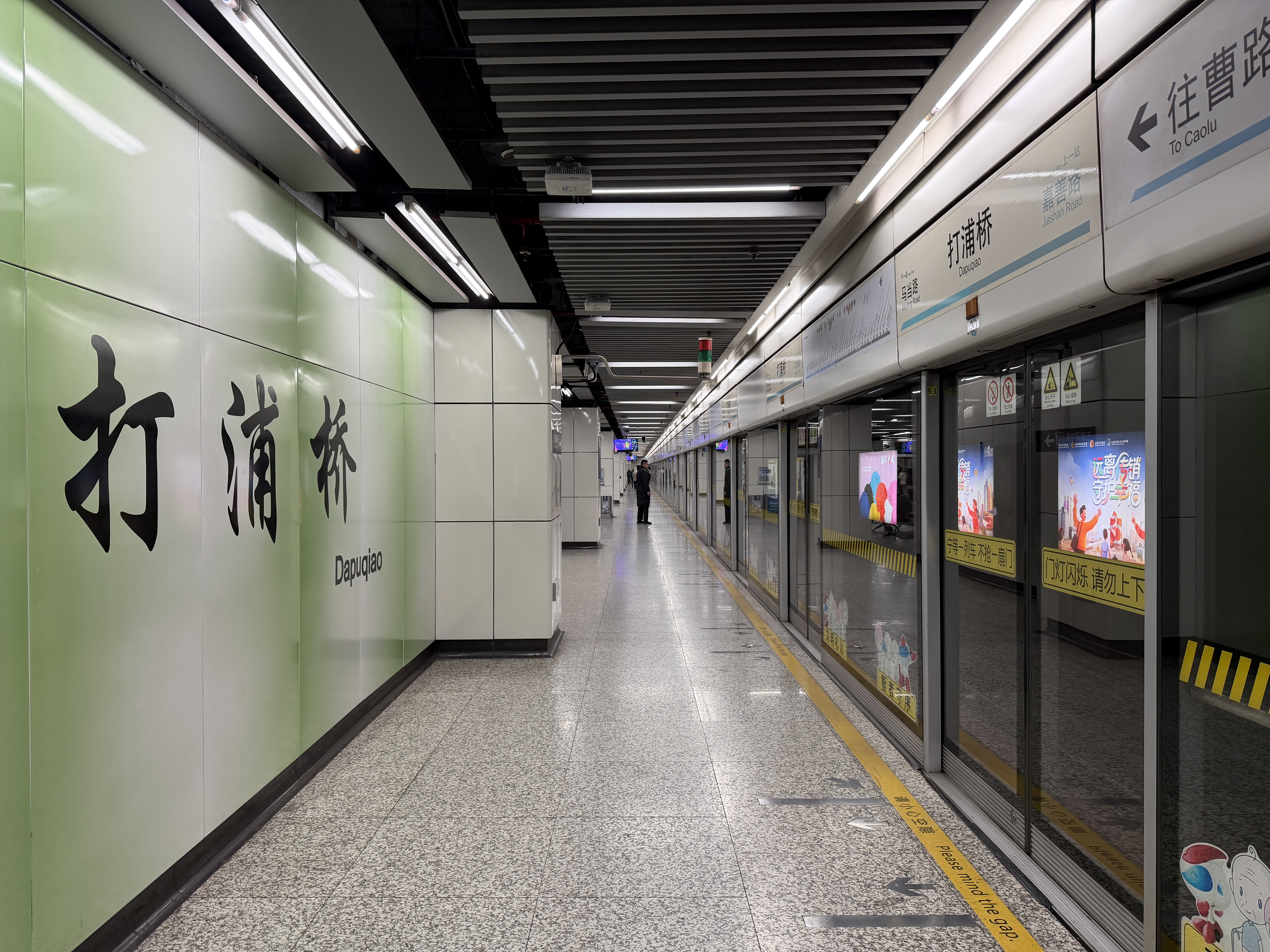
- Station platform

General information
- Location: Xujiahui Road; Dapuqiao Subdistrict, Huangpu District, Shanghai; China
- Coordinates: 31°12′27″N 121°27′50″E
- Operator: Shanghai No. 1 Metro Operation Co., Ltd.
- Line: Line 9
- Platforms: 2 (1 island platform)
- Tracks: 2

Construction
- Structure type: Underground
- Accessible: Yes

History
- Opened: 31 December 2009

Services
Preceding station	Shanghai Metro	Following station
Jiashan Road towards Shanghai Songjiang Railway Station	Line 9	Madang Road towards Caolu
Location
- Location within Shanghai

Dapuqiao (simplified Chinese: 打浦桥; traditional Chinese: 打浦橋; pinyin: Dápǔqiáo) is a station on Line 9 of the Shanghai Metro. The station came into operation on December 31, 2009. It is located beneath the Xuhui Sun Moon Light Center.
