= Laoximen station =

Shanghai Metro interchange station

Laoximen 老西门
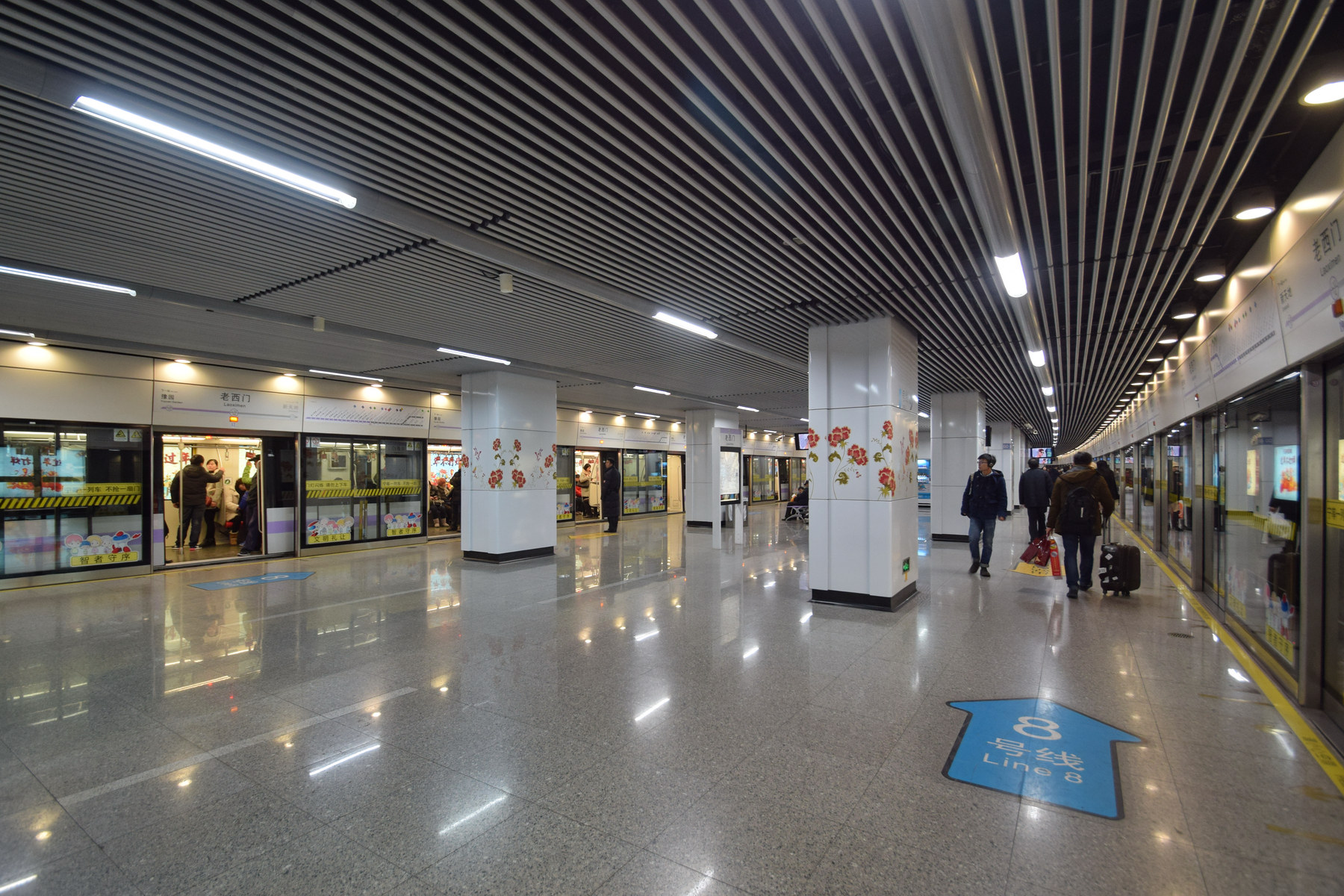
- Platform of Line 10

General information
- Location: South Xizang Road, Middle Fuxing Road and East Fuxing Road; Huangpu District, Shanghai; China
- Coordinates: 31°13′15″N 121°28′42″E
- Operated by: Shanghai No. 1/4 Metro Operation Co. Ltd.
- Lines: Line 8; Line 10
- Platforms: 4 (2 island platforms)
- Tracks: 4

Construction
- Structure type: Underground
- Accessible: Yes

Other information
- Station code: L10/14 (Line 10)

History
- Opened: 29 December 2007 (Line 8); 10 April 2010 (Line 10)

Services
| Preceding station | Shanghai Metro | Following station |
|---|---|---|
| Dashijie towards Shiguang Road | Line 8 | Lujiabang Road towards Shendu Highway |
| Site of the First CPC National Congress · Xintiandi towards Hongqiao Railway Station or Hangzhong Road | Line 10 | Yuyuan Garden towards Jilong Road |
Location

Laoximen (Chinese: 老西门; pinyin: Lǎoxīmén) is an interchange station between Lines 8 and 10 of the Shanghai Metro. It began operation on 29 December 2007 with the opening of line 8. It became an interchange station with the opening of line 10 on 10 April 2010.

The name of the station is derived from the Old West Gate (or Laoximen (老西门)) of the walled Chinese city.

The station is located in Huangpu District, near the intersection of Middle Fuxing Road and South Xizang Road.

== Station layout ==
| 1F | Ground level | Exits |
| B1 | Concourse | Tickets, Service Center |
| B2 | Platform 1 | ← Line 8 towards Shiguang Road (Dashijie) |
| B2 | Island platform, doors open on the left |
| B2 | Platform 2 | Line 8 towards Shendu Highway (Lujiabang Road) → |
| B3 | Platform 3 | ← Line 10 towards Hongqiao Railway Station or Hangzhong Road (Site of the First CPC National Congress · Xintiandi) |
| B3 | Island platform, doors open on the left |
| B3 | Platform 4 | Line 10 towards Jilong Road (Yuyuan Garden) → |

=== Entrances/exits ===
- 1: Xizang Road (S), Fuxing Road (E)
- 2: Xizang Road (S), Fuxing Road (E), Yancheng Road
- 3: Xizang Road (S), Zhaozhou Road
- 4: Xizang Road (S), Fuxing Road (M)
- 5: Xizang Road (S), Fuxing Road (M)
- 6: Zhonghua Road, Fuxing Road (E)
- 7: Fuxing Road (E), Zhonghua Road

== Around the station ==
- Xiaotaoyuan Mosque
