= Nanshi, Shanghai =

Historical district of Shanghai, China

Nanshi District, Shanghai Municipality 上海市南市区
- District of the People's Republic of China
- 1959–2000
- Location of Nanshi District in Shanghai Municipality
- Area
  - Coordinates: 31°13′30″N 121°29′06″E
- History
  - Established: 1959
  - Disestablished: 2000
Preceded by	Succeeded by
Yimiao District; Penglai District	Huangpu District, Shanghai
- Today part of: Part of the Huangpu District

Nanshi, Shanghai
- Traditional Chinese: 南市區
- Simplified Chinese: 南市区
- Wugniu: noe^{2} zy^{4} chiu^{1}
Transcriptions
Standard Mandarin
- Hanyu Pinyin: Nánshì Qū
Wu
- Wugniu: noe^{2} zy^{4} chiu^{1}
Yue: Cantonese
- Jyutping: naam^{4} si^{5} keoi^{1}

Nanshi District was a district located in central Shanghai until its merger with Huangpu District, Shanghai on 13 June 2000. It had an area of 8.29 km^{2} (3.20 sq mi), of which 1.42 km^{2} (0.55 sq mi) was water, and a population of 435,420 as of June 2000.

== Location ==
The former Nanshi District, literally "southern city", was the historical core of Shanghai. It included the old, walled city as well as the nearby docklands on both sides of the Huangpu River. Shanghai County was established at the beginning of the Ming Dynasty. A city wall was built to repel the Wokou, and this Ming Dynasty wall defined the extent of urban Shanghai for the next few centuries.

== History ==
In 1842, the area north of the old city was established as the British concession in Shanghai, which later became the Shanghai International Settlement. At the time, the concession was referred to by locals as the "northern city" while the walled Chinese city was the "southern city". From this reference was later derived the name Nanshi (Chinese: 南市; pinyin: Nánshì; Wugniu: noe-zy; lit. 'Southern City'). Upon the defeat of Japan at the end of World War II, a unified municipal administration was established over urban Shanghai for the first time since the mid 19th century.

In 1945, after the Republic of China government took control, the old city was divided into the Third District (Yimiao District) and the Fourth District (Penglai District). In 1959 these were merged to form Nanshi District (with a small part of former Yimiao District merging into Luwan District).

== See also ==
- Huangpu District, Shanghai
- Old City of Shanghai
