= Lujiabang Road station =

Shanghai Metro interchange station

Coordinates: 31.2139°N 121.481°E

Lujiabang Road 陆家浜路
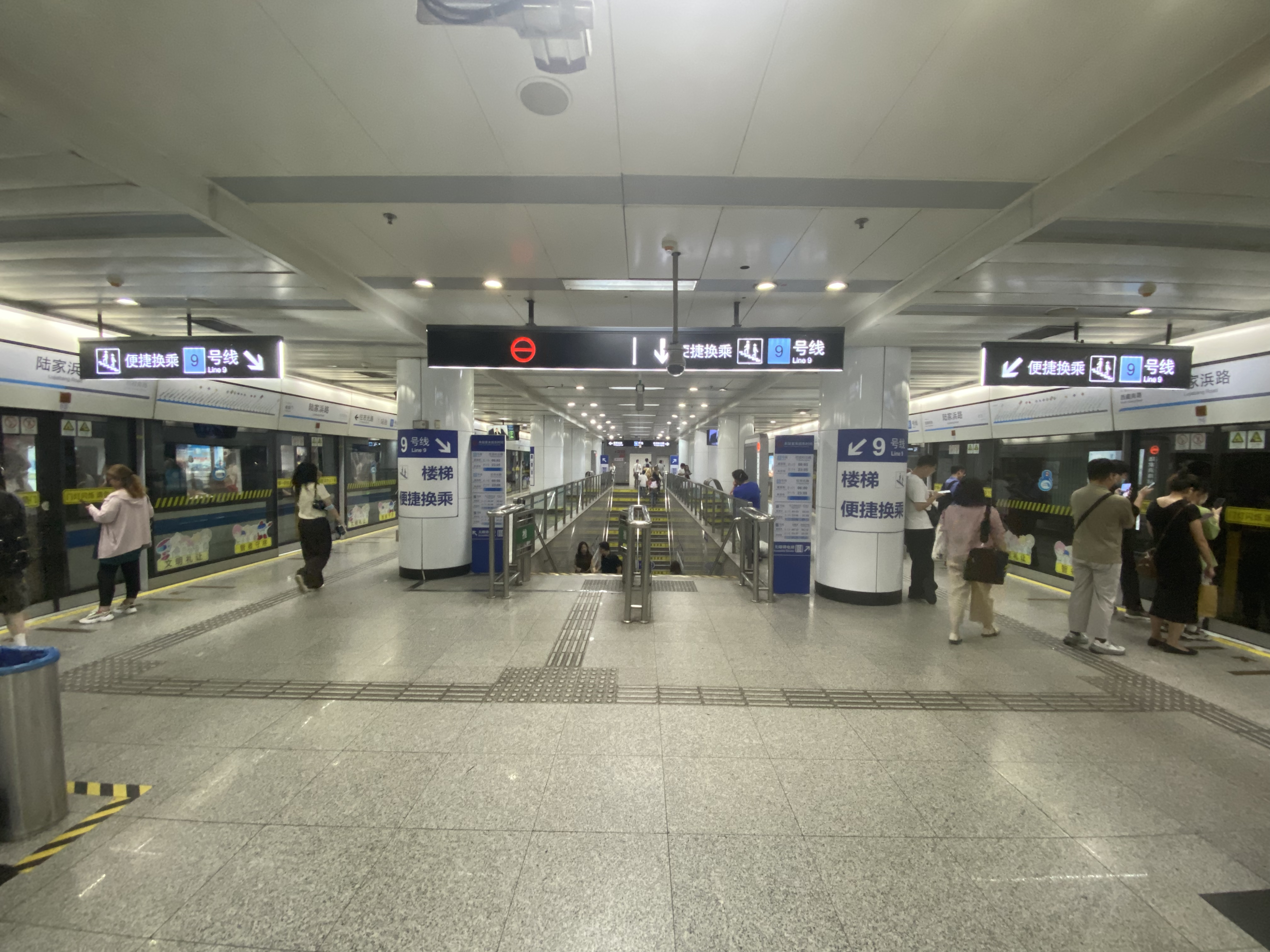
- Line 8 platform

General information
- Location: South Xizang Road and Lujiabang Road; Huangpu District, Shanghai; China
- Operator: Shanghai No. 1/4 Metro Operation Co. Ltd.
- Lines: Line 8; Line 9
- Platforms: 4 (2 island platforms)
- Tracks: 4

Construction
- Structure type: Underground
- Accessible: Yes

History
- Opened: 29 December 2007 (Line 8); 31 December 2009 (Line 9)

Services
Preceding station	Shanghai Metro	Following station
Laoximen towards Shiguang Road	Line 8	South Xizang Road towards Shendu Highway
Madang Road towards Shanghai Songjiang Railway Station	Line 9	Xiaonanmen towards Caolu
Location
- Location within Shanghai

Lujiabang Road (Chinese: 陆家浜路; pinyin: Lùjiābāng Lù) is the name of an interchange station between Lines 8 and 9 on the Shanghai Metro network. It began operation on 29 December 2007 with the opening of line 8. It became an interchange station on 31 December 2009 with the opening of line 9.

The station is located in Huangpu District, Shanghai.

== Station layout ==
1F	Ground level	Exits
B1	Concourse	Tickets, Service Center
B2	Platform 1	← Line 8 towards Shiguang Road (Laoximen)
B2	Island platform, doors open on the left
B2	Platform 2	Line 8 towards Shendu Highway (South Xizang Road) →
B3	Platform 3	← Line 9 towards Shanghai Songjiang Railway Station (Madang Road)
B3	Island platform, doors open on the left
B3	Platform 4	Line 9 towards Caolu (Xiaonanmen) →

=== Entrances/exits ===
- 1: Xizang Road (S), Dalin Road
- 2: Xizang Road (S)
- 3: Xizang Road (S), Lujiabang Road
- 4: Dalin Road, Xizang Road (S)
- 6: Lujiabang Road
- 7: Lujiabang Road, Ximinli Road

== Gallery ==
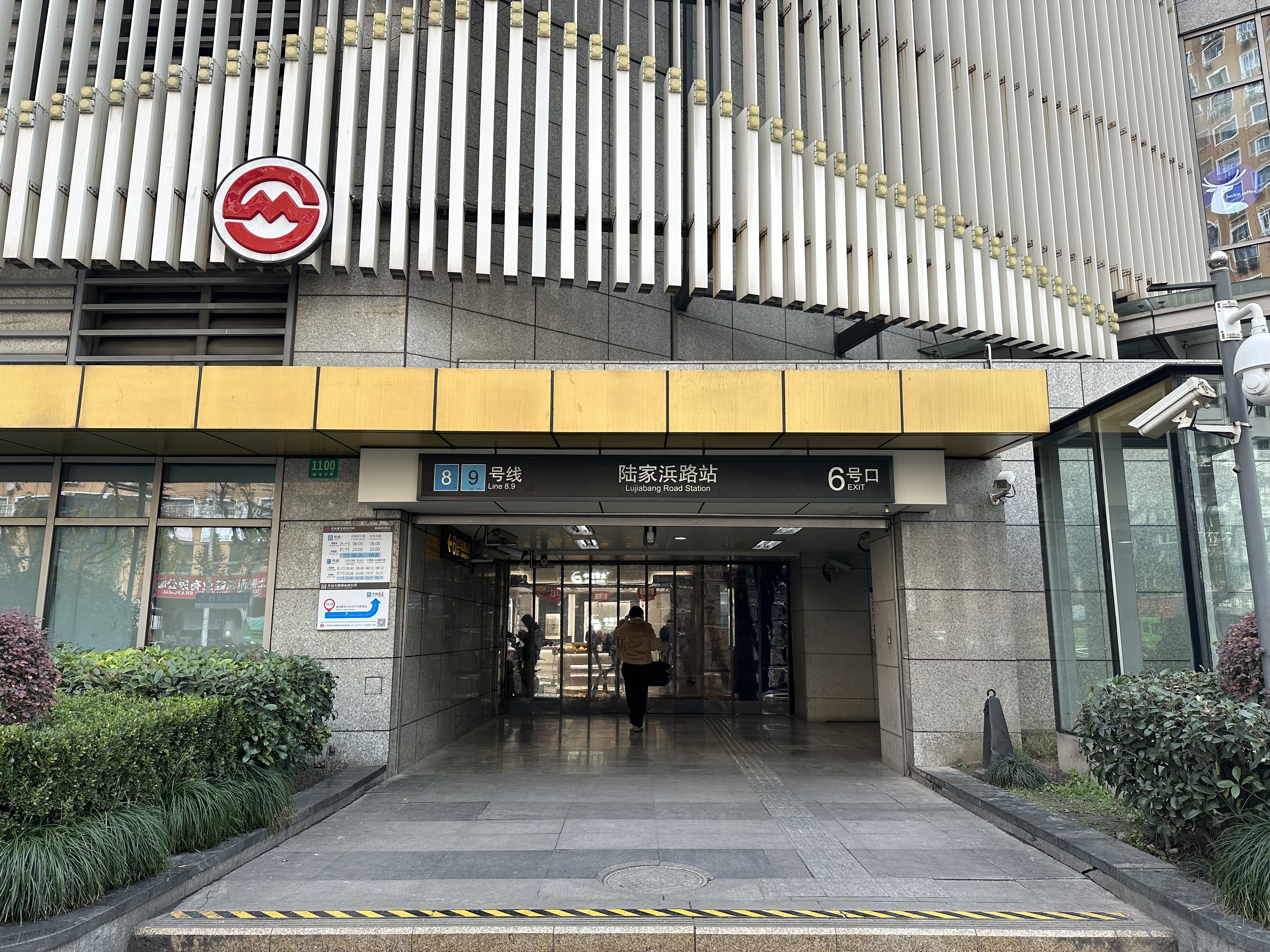
Exit 6

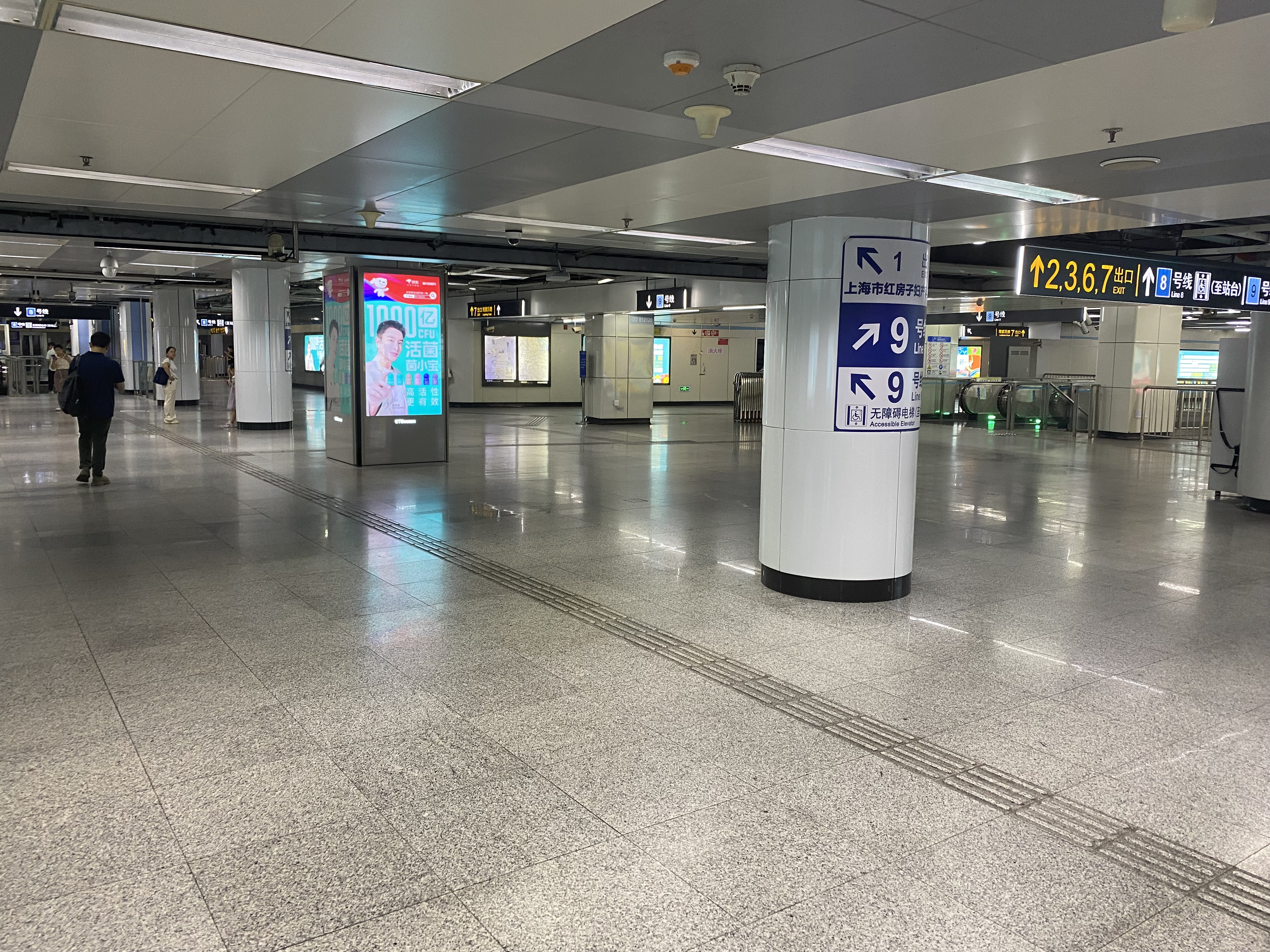
Concourse

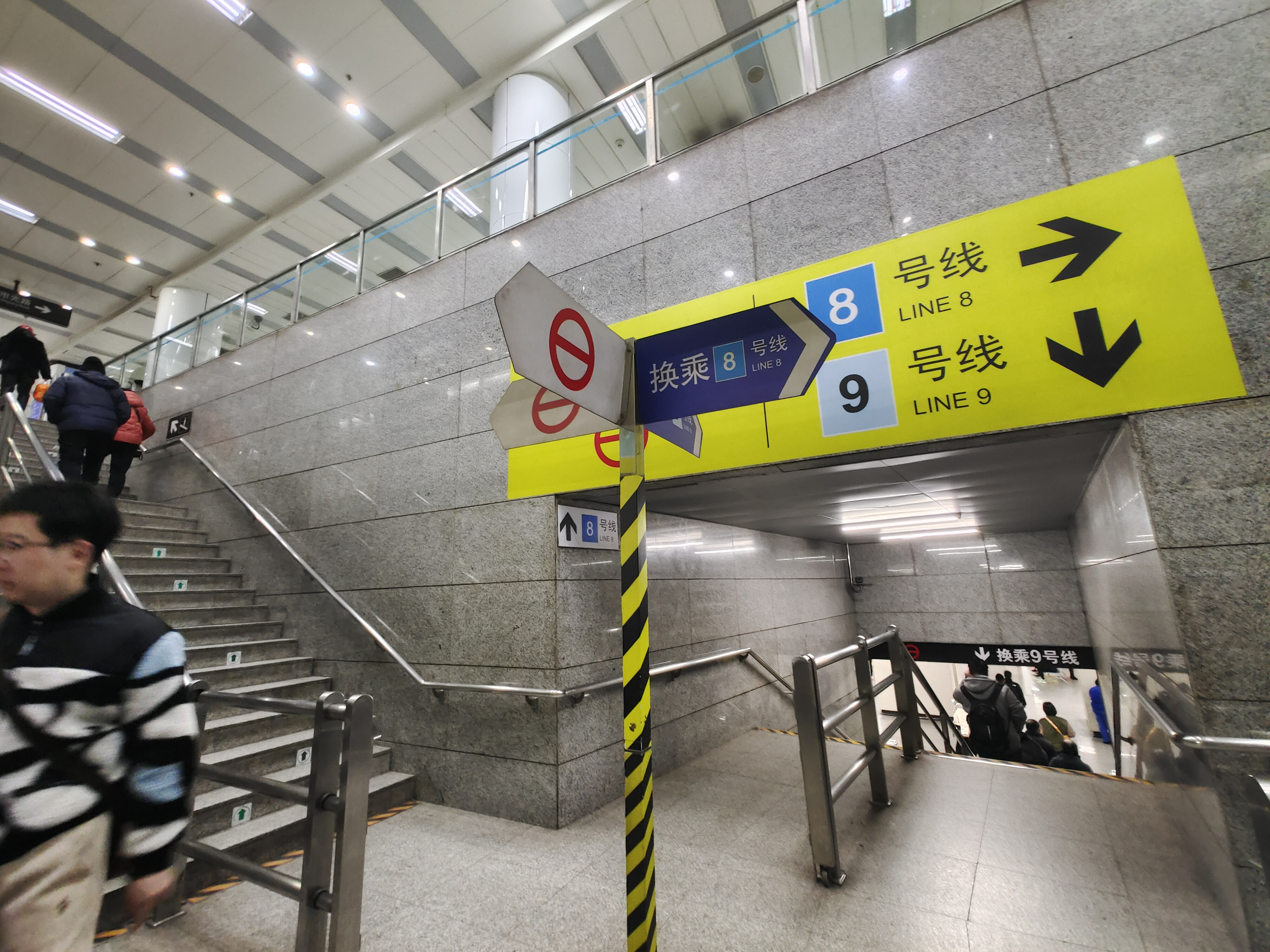
Transfer passage

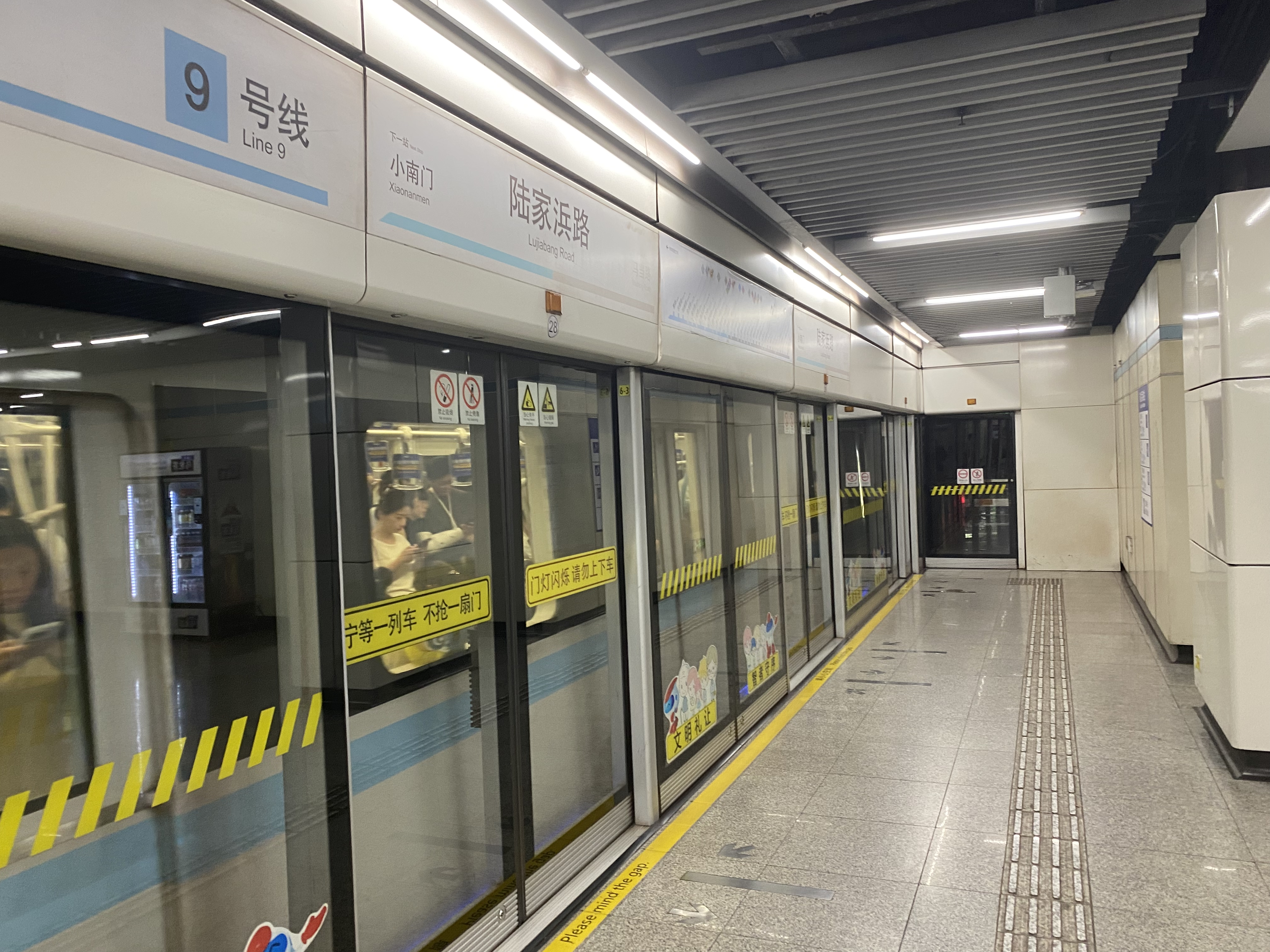
Line 9 platform
