= Luban Road station =

Shanghai Metro station

Luban Road 鲁班路
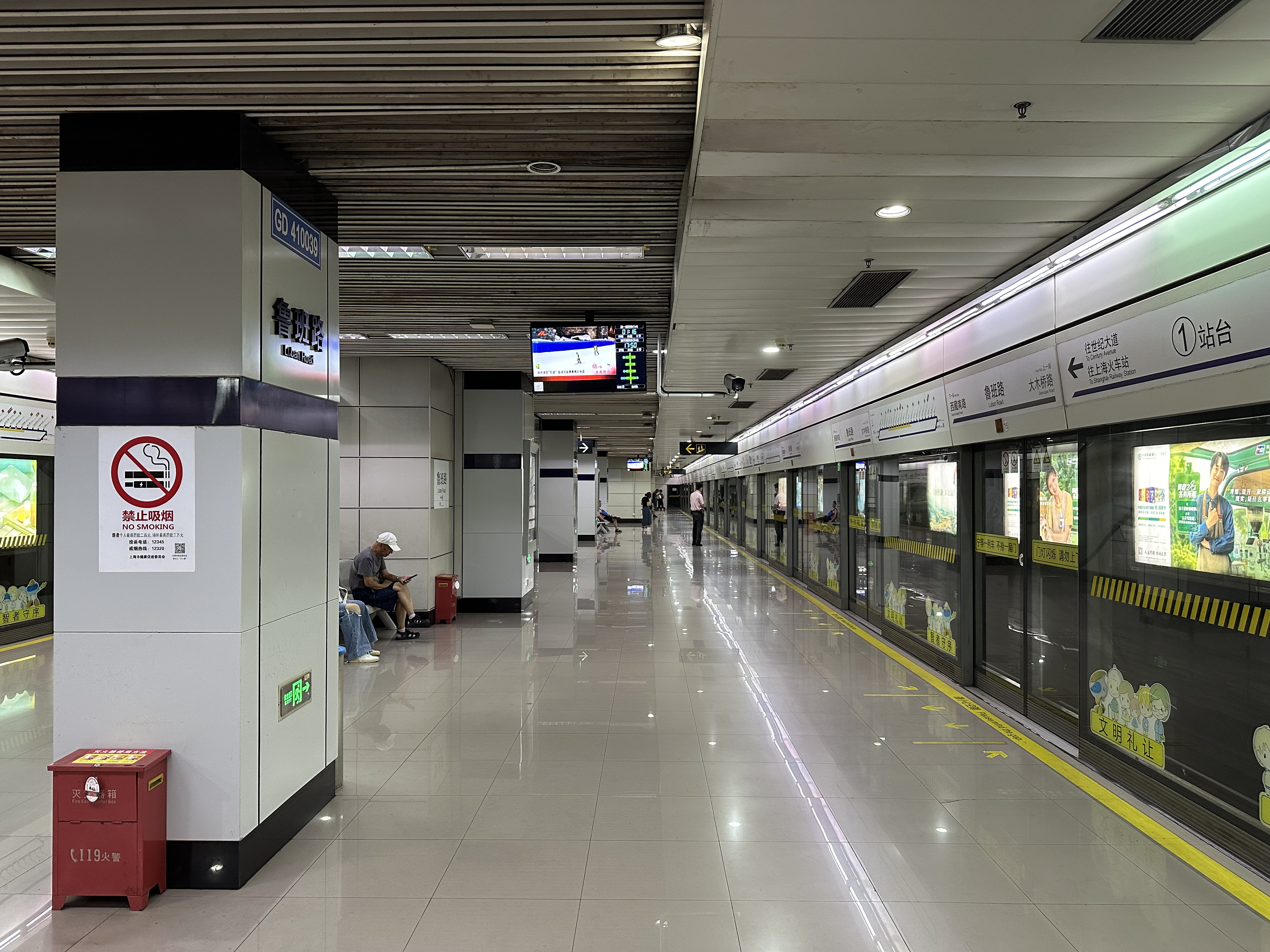
- Station platform

General information
- Location: Quxi Road (瞿溪路) and Luban Road; Huangpu District, Shanghai; China
- Coordinates: 31°11′57″N 121°28′31″E
- Operator: Shanghai No. 3 Metro Operation Co. Ltd.
- Line: Line 4
- Platforms: 2 (1 island platform)
- Tracks: 2

Construction
- Structure type: Underground
- Accessible: Yes

History
- Opened: 29 December 2007; 18 years ago

Services
Preceding station	Shanghai Metro	Following station
Damuqiao Road Clockwise	Line 4	South Xizang Road Counter-clockwise
Location
- Location within Shanghai

Luban Road (simplified Chinese: 鲁班路; traditional Chinese: 魯班路; pinyin: Lǔbān Lù) is a station on Shanghai Metro Line 4. Service began at the station on 29 December 2007.
