= Tangqiao station =

Shanghai Metro station

Tangqiao 塘桥
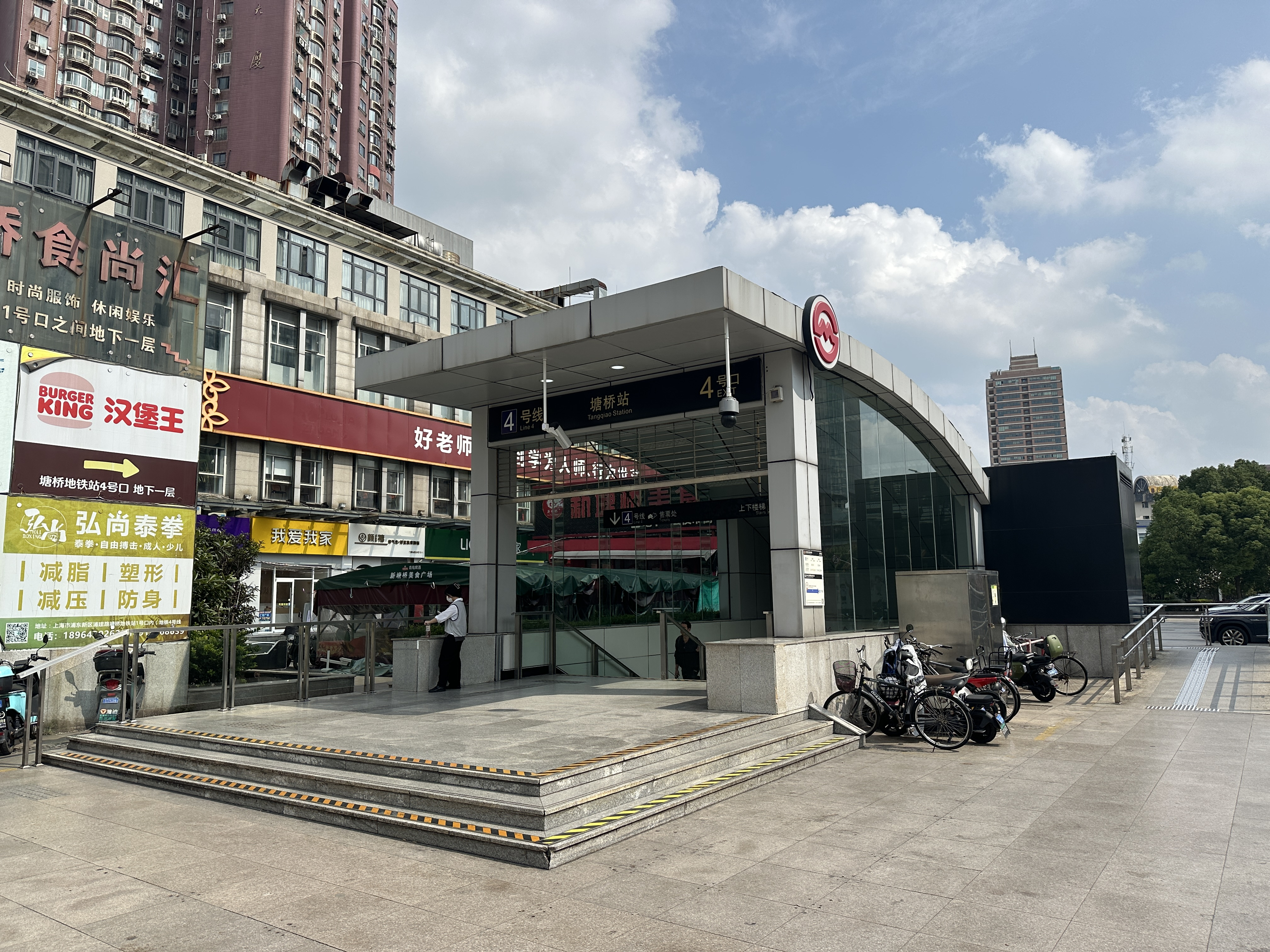
- Station entrance

General information
- Location: Pujian Road; Pudong, Shanghai; China
- Coordinates: 31°12′37″N 121°31′06″E
- Operator: Shanghai No. 3 Metro Operation Co. Ltd.
- Line: Line 4
- Platforms: 2 (1 island platform)
- Tracks: 2

Construction
- Structure type: Underground
- Accessible: Yes

History
- Opened: 29 December 2007; 18 years ago

Services
Preceding station	Shanghai Metro	Following station
Nanpu Bridge Clockwise	Line 4	Lancun Road Counter-clockwise
Location
- Location within Shanghai

Tangqiao (simplified Chinese: 塘桥; traditional Chinese: 塘橋; pinyin: Tángqiáo) is a station on Shanghai Metro Line 4. Service began at this station on 29 December 2007. It is the first station in Pudong when travelling counter-clockwise after crossing the Huangpu River from Puxi. The West exit opens up to the Shanghai Sheraton, while the East exit opens up to a shopping mall.

== Places nearby ==
- Renji Hospital (East Part)
- Shanghai Children's Medical Center
