= World Expo Museum station =

Shanghai Metro station

World Expo Museum 世博会博物馆
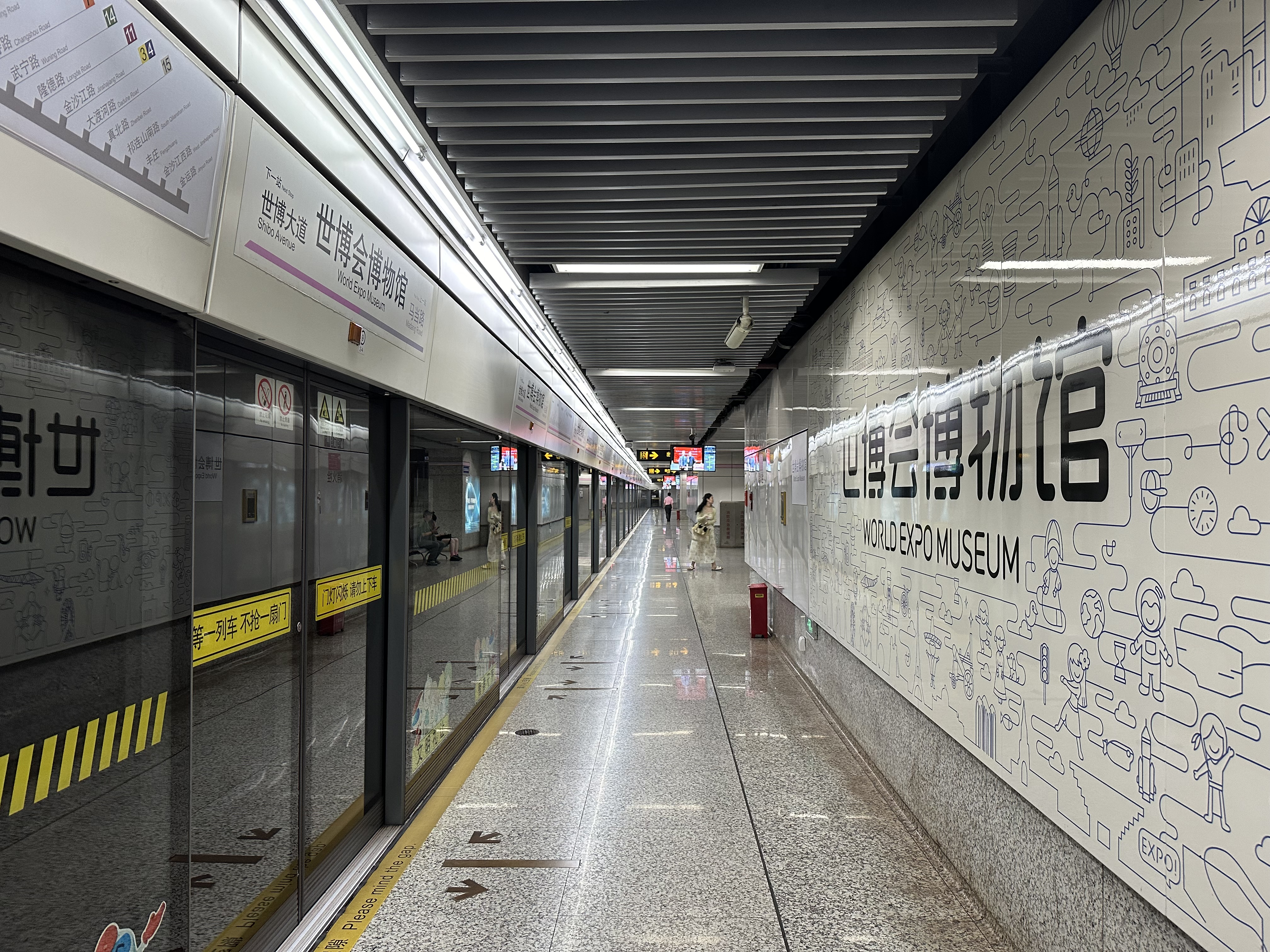
- Station platform

General information
- Location: Mengzi Road (蒙自路) and East Longhua Road; Huangpu District, Shanghai; China
- Coordinates: 31°11′58″N 121°28′38″E
- Operator: Shanghai No. 2 Metro Operation Co. Ltd.
- Line: Line 13
- Platforms: 2 (1 island platform)
- Tracks: 2

Construction
- Structure type: Underground
- Accessible: Yes

History
- Opened: 20 April 2010; 19 December 2015 (reopen)
- Closed: 2 November 2010 (suspended)
- Former names: Lupu Bridge (between 20 April 2010 and 2November 2010, during the Expo line opening)

Services
Preceding station	Shanghai Metro	Following station
Madang Road towards Jinyun Road	Line 13	Shibo Avenue towards Zhangjiang Road
Location

World Expo Museum Station (simplified Chinese: 世博会博物馆; traditional Chinese: 世博會博物館; pinyin: Shìbóhuì Bówùguǎn) is the name of a station on Line 13 of the Shanghai Metro. It was previously known as Lupu Bridge Station (卢浦大桥; 盧浦大橋; Lúpǔ Dàqiáo) when the section of Line 13 between Madang Road and Shibo Avenue operated as a temporary transit line during the 2010 World Expo. It reopened with its current name on 19 December 2015.
