= Madang Road station =

Shanghai Metro interchange station

Coordinates: 31.2114°N 121.472°E

Madang Road 马当路
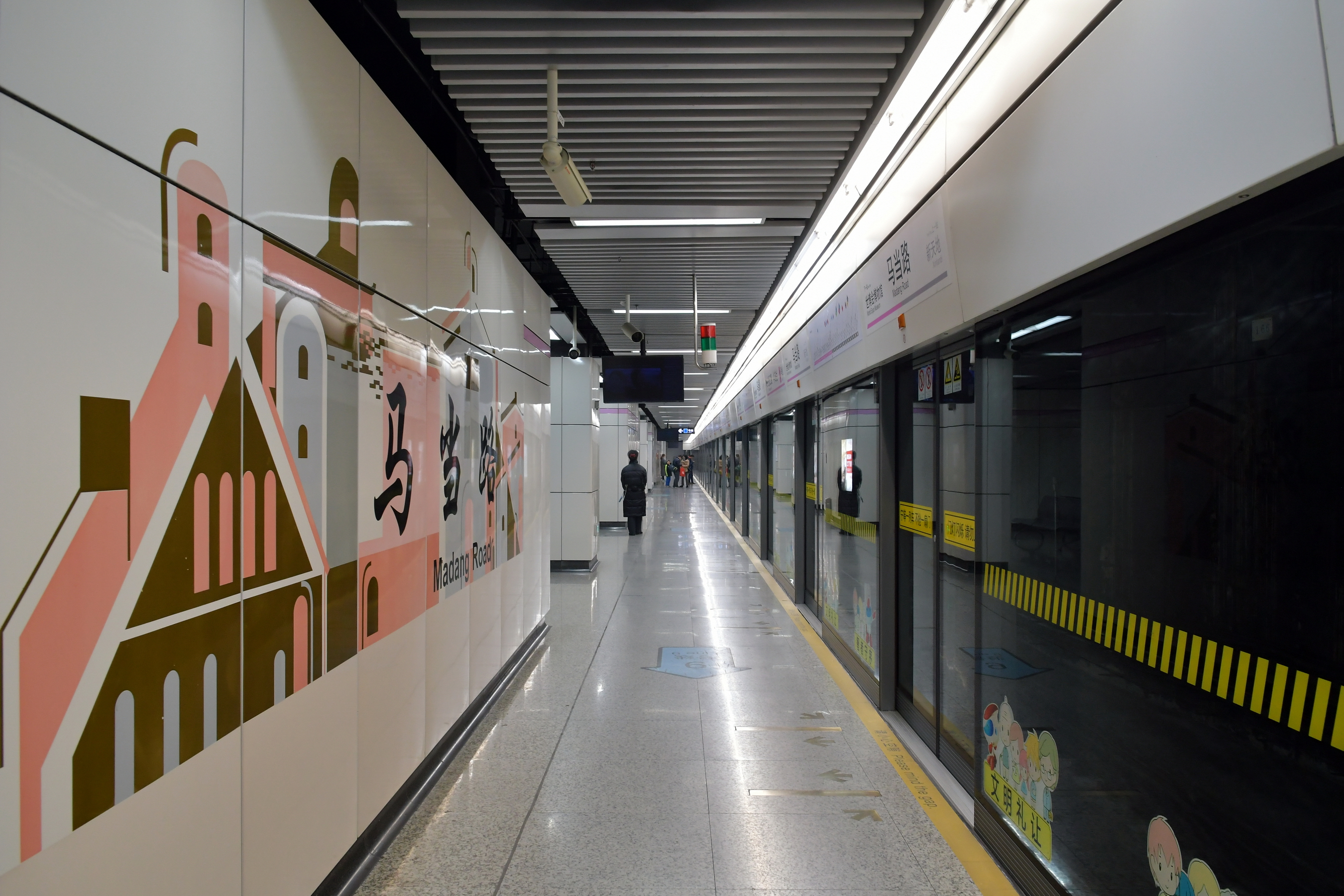
- Line 13 platform

General information
- Location: Xujiahui Road and Madang Road (马当路); Huangpu District, Shanghai; China
- Operator: Shanghai No. 1/2 Metro Operation Co. Ltd.
- Lines: Line 9; Line 13
- Platforms: 4 (1 island platform for Line 13 and 2 side platforms for Line 9)
- Tracks: 4

Construction
- Structure type: Underground
- Accessible: Yes

History
- Opened: 31 December 2009 (Line 9); 20 April 2010 (Expo line); 19 December 2015 (Line 13 re-opening)
- Closed: 2 November 2010 (Expo line)

Services
Preceding station	Shanghai Metro	Following station
Dapuqiao towards Shanghai Songjiang Railway Station	Line 9	Lujiabang Road towards Caolu
Site of the First CPC National Congress · Xintiandi towards Jinyun Road	Line 13	World Expo Museum towards Zhangjiang Road
Location
- Location within Shanghai

Madang Road (simplified Chinese: 马当路; traditional Chinese: 馬當路; pinyin: Mǎdāng Lù) became an interchange station between lines 9 and 13 of the Shanghai Metro on 19 December 2015.

The station opened on 31 December 2009, together with the other stations on Line 9's east extension.

The station was the temporary (between 20 April 2010 and 2 November 2010) terminus of Expo line/Line 13 during 2010 World Expo.

The station is located near the intersection of Madang Road and Xujiahui Road in Shanghai's Huangpu District.

== Station layout ==
1F	Ground level	Exits
B1	Concourse	Tickets, Service Center
B2	Side platform, doors open on the right
B2	Platform 1	← Line 9 towards Shanghai Songjiang Railway Station (Dapuqiao)
B2	Platform 2	Line 9 towards Caolu (Lujiabang Road) →
B2	Side platform, doors open on the right
B3	Platform 3	← Line 13 towards Jinyun Road (Site of the First CPC National Congress · Xintiandi)
B3	Island platform, doors open on the left
B3	Platform 4	Line 13 towards Zhangjiang Road (World Expo Museum) →

=== Entrances/exits ===
- 1: Xujiahui Road, Huangpi Road (S)
- 3: Mengzi Road, Xujiahui Road
- 4: Madang Road, Xujiahui Road
- 5: Mengzi Road, Jianguo Road (E)
