= Huangpu, Shanghai =

Huangpu 黄浦区 Whangpoo
- District
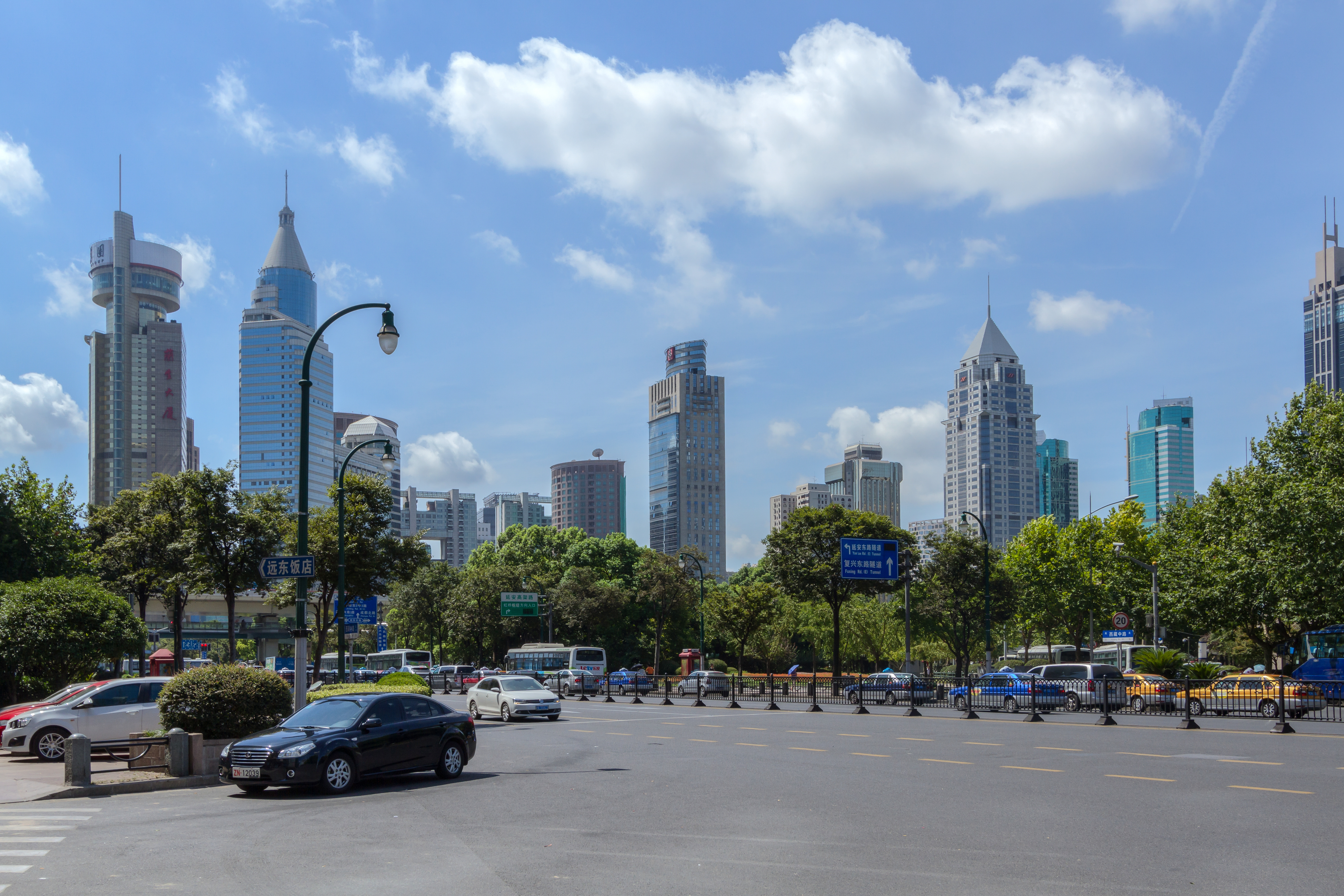
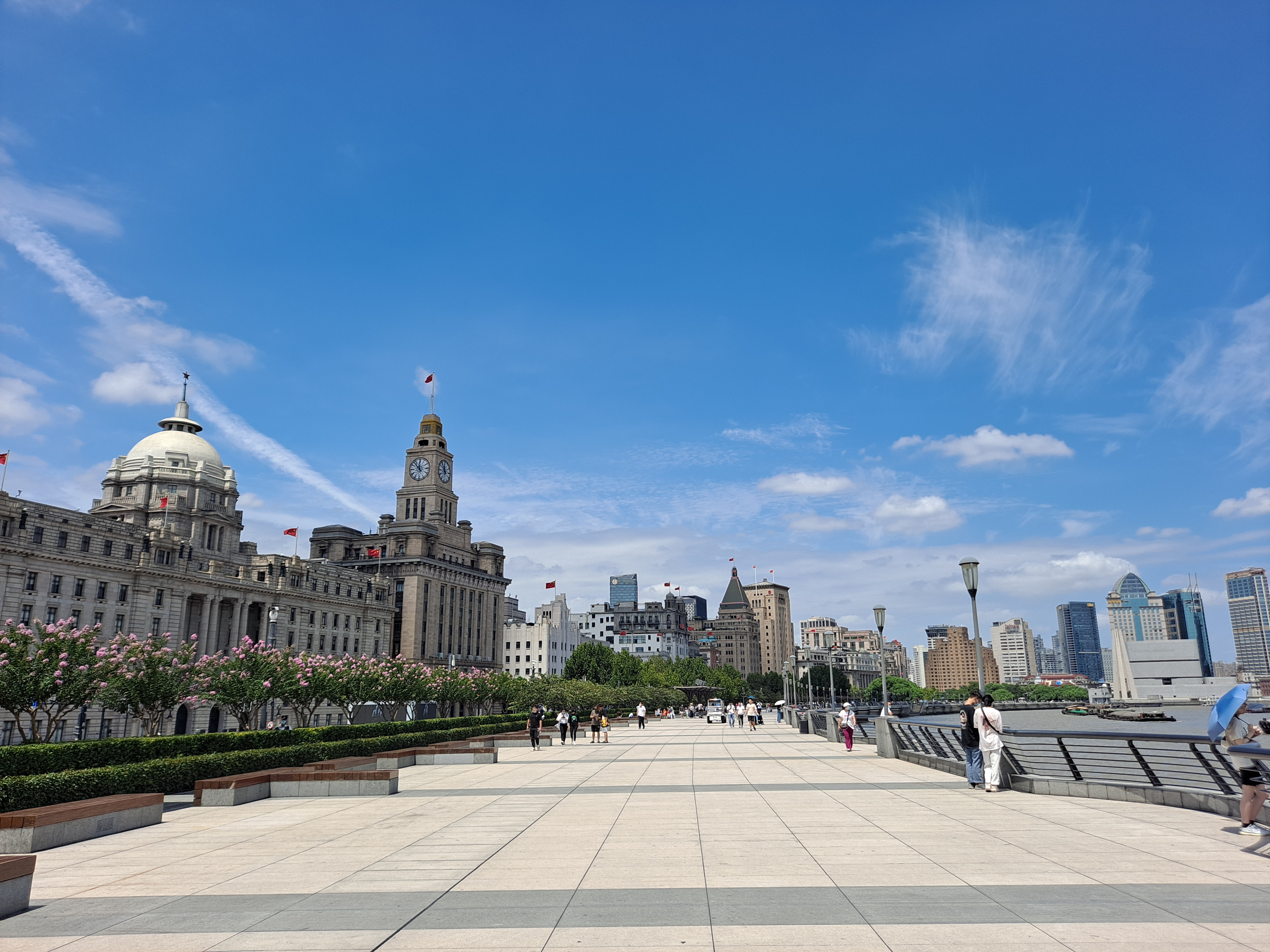
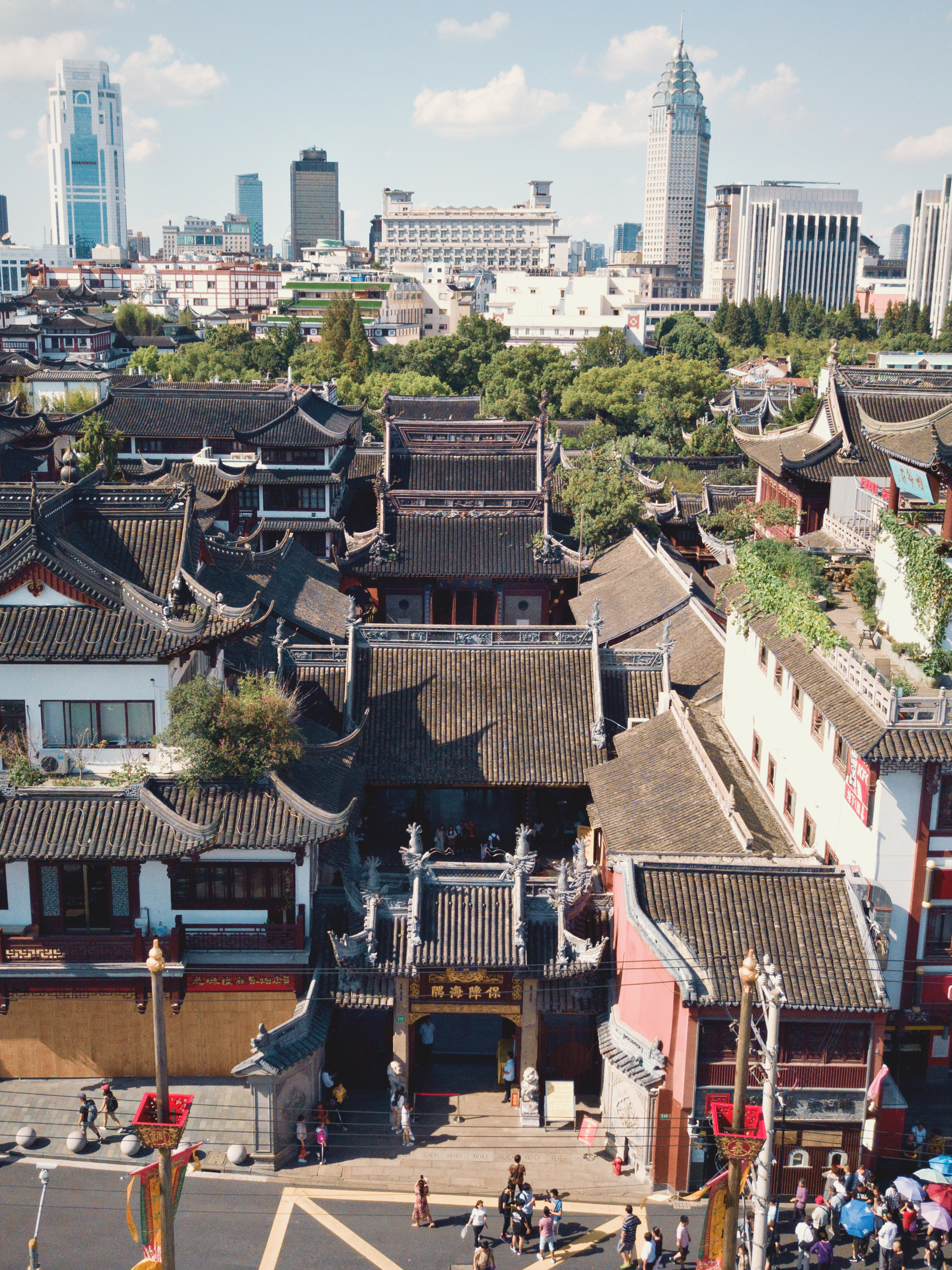
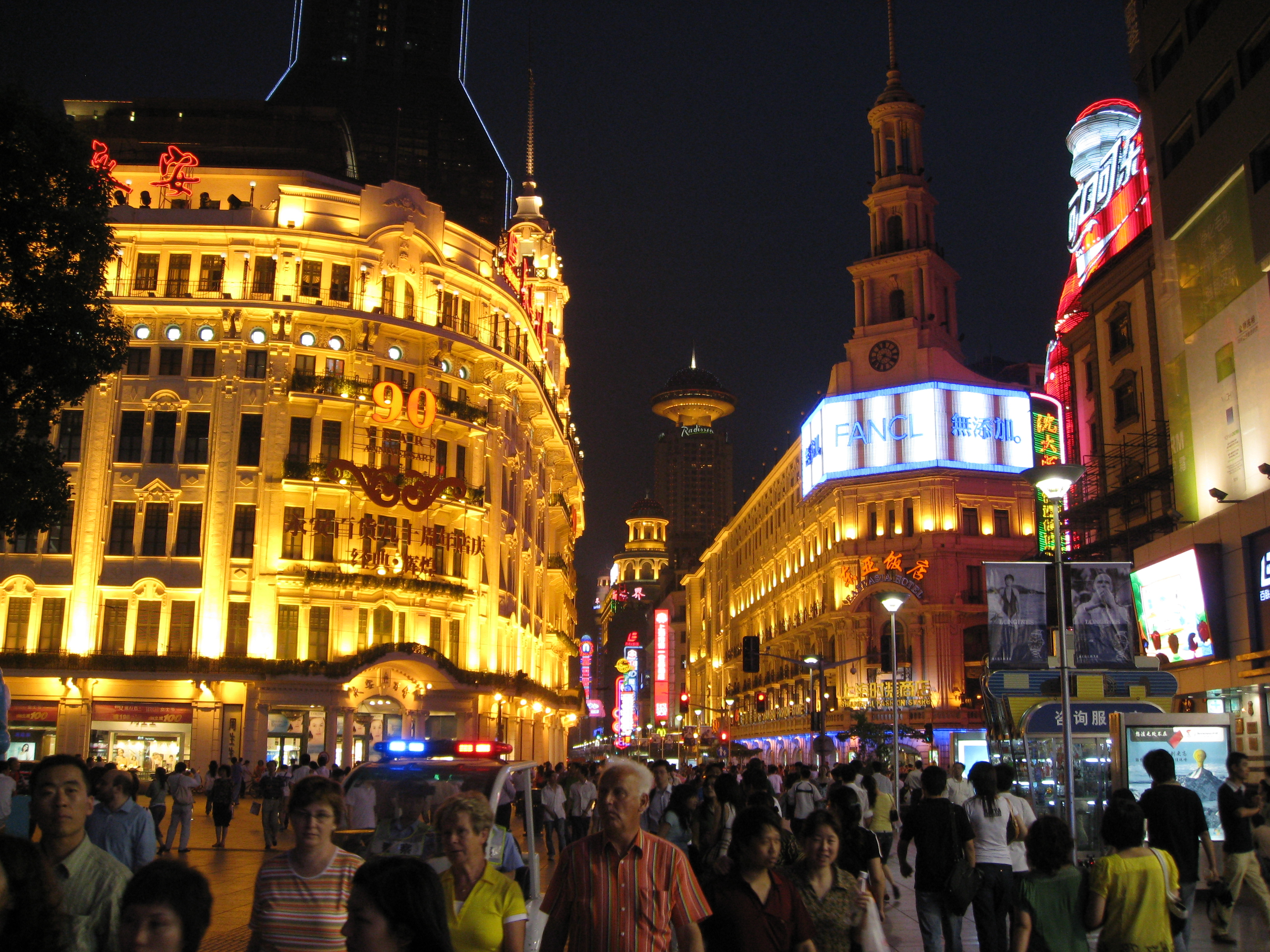
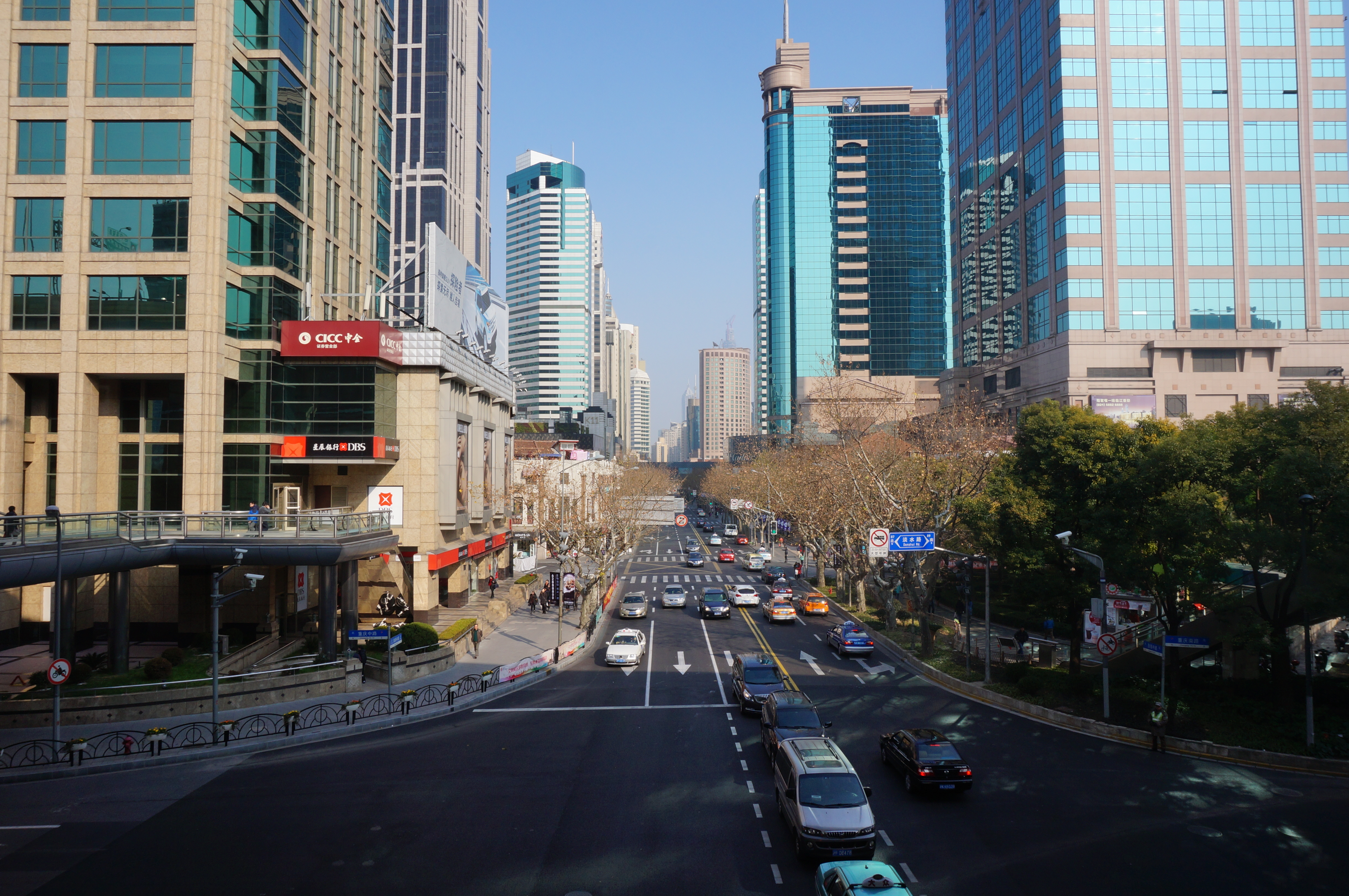
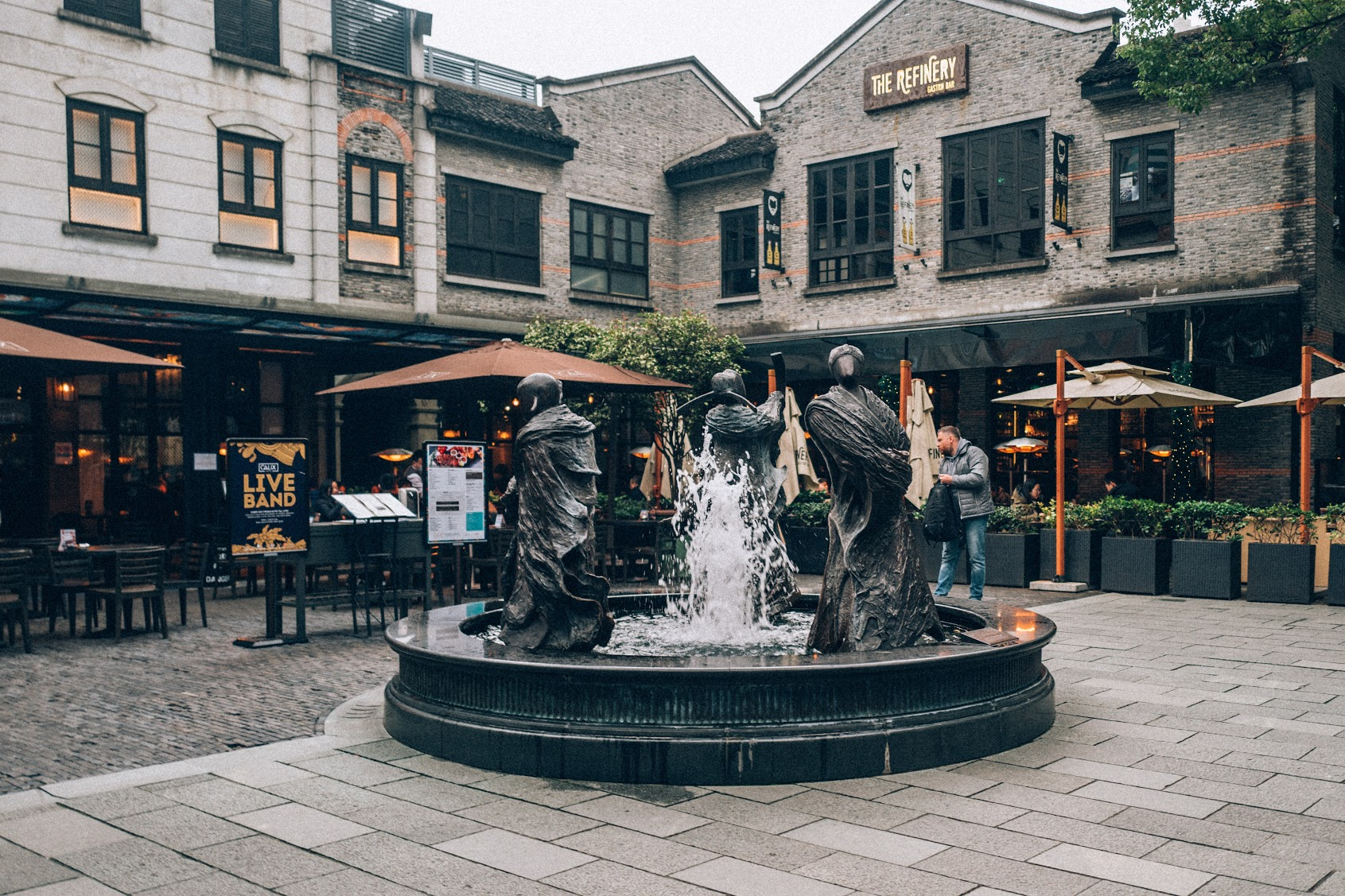
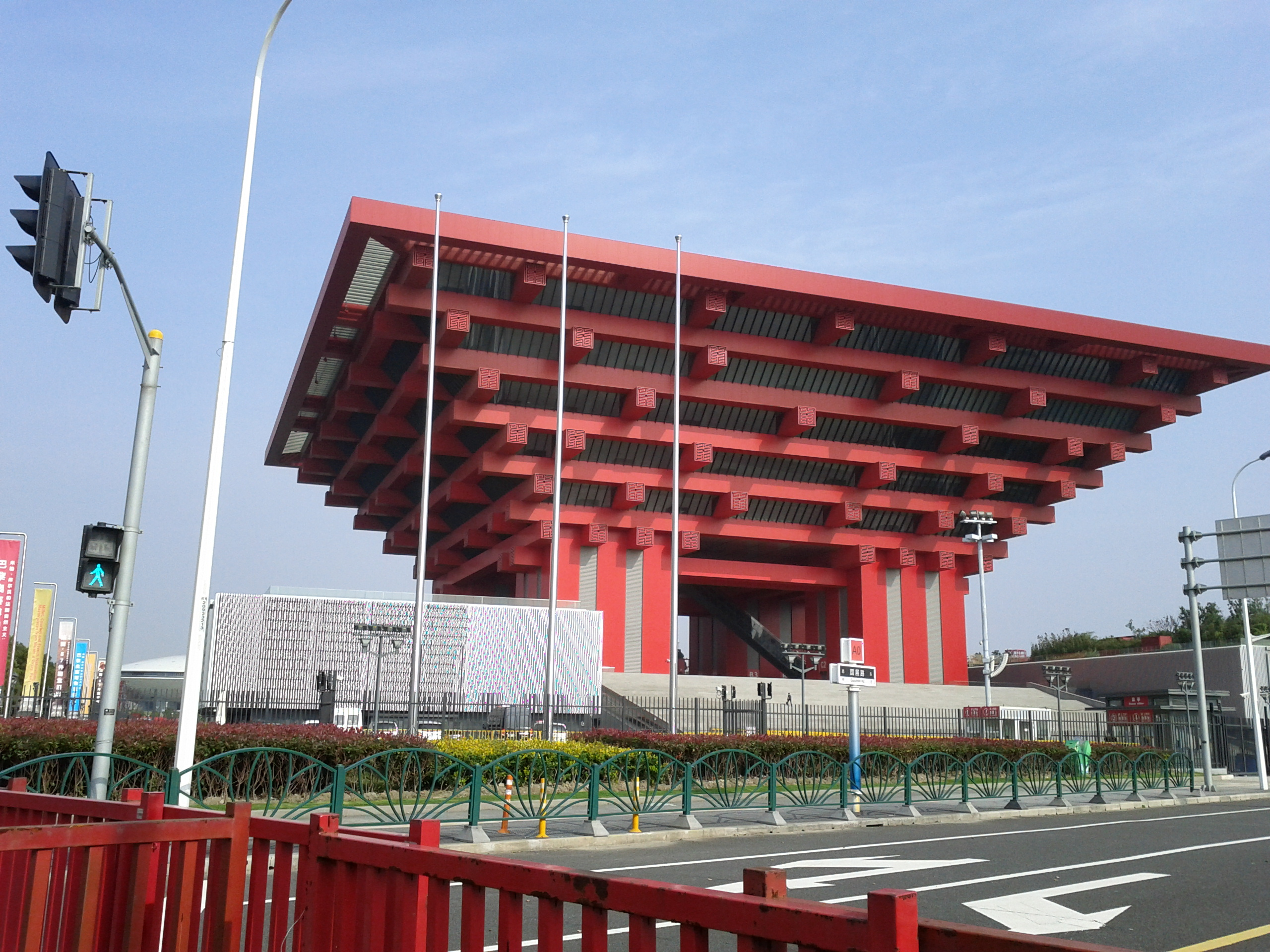
- People's Square The Bund Old City God Temple Nanjing Road Huaihai Road Xintiandi China Art Museum
- Interactive map of Huangpu
- Location within Shanghai
- Coordinates: 31°13′59″N 121°29′06″E
- Country: People's Republic of China
- Municipality: Shanghai

Area
  - Total: 20.52 km^{2} (7.92 sq mi)
  - Land: 18.72 km^{2} (7.23 sq mi)
  - Water: 1.82 km^{2} (0.70 sq mi)

Population
  - Total: 656,200
  - Density: 35,050/km^{2} (90,790/sq mi)
- Time zone: UTC+8 (China Standard)
- Area code: 21

Huangpu, Shanghai
- Simplified Chinese: 黄浦区
- Traditional Chinese: 黃浦區
- Wugniu: waon^{2} phu^{3} chiu^{1}
- Postal: Whangpoo
Transcriptions
Standard Mandarin
- Hanyu Pinyin: Huángpǔ Qū
- Wade–Giles: Huang³-pʻu² Chʻü¹
Wu
- Wugniu: waon^{2} phu^{3} chiu^{1}
- IPA: Shanghainese: [ɦuɑ̃˩ pʰu˦ tɕʰy˩]
Yue: Cantonese
- Jyutping: wong^{4} pou^{2} keoi^{1}

Huangpu District (Wugniu: waon^{6} phu^{5} chiu^{1}, Mandarin pronunciation) makes up the eastern part of Shanghai's traditional urban core in China. It is today the most central of Shanghai's 16 districts. Huangpu district is the seat of municipal government, includes key attractions such as The Bund and the Old City God Temple, as well as popular shopping districts such as Nanjing Road, Huaihai Road, and Xintiandi. The Huangpu District is one of the most densely populated urban districts in the world.

== Location ==
The Huangpu District is located in central Shanghai, People's Republic of China on the left bank (i.e., west or north bank) of Huangpu River, after which the district is named. It is opposite to Pudong and is bounded by Suzhou Creek to the north.

Today's Huangpu District is sometimes referred to as "new Huangpu" to distinguish it from the pre-merger Huangpu District which existed before 2000. In 2000, the pre-merger Huangpu and Nanshi districts were combined to form a new district, also called Huangpu. In June 2011, the existing Huangpu District was combined with Luwan District to form a further new district, again called Huangpu. As a result of this merger, it currently has an area of 20.43 square kilometres (7.89 sq mi) and 678,670 inhabitants (as of 2010 census).

Of the three previous districts that make up today's Huangpu, the pre-merger Huangpu District is located to the north, bounded by Suzhou Creek in the north and the Huangpu River to the east. South of the per-merger Huangpu District was Nanshi District, bounded by the Huangpu River to the east. West of Nanshi District was Luwan District, bounded by the Huangpu River to the south.

== Administrative Division of Huangpu District ==
Huangpu District has ten subdistricts.

Name	Chinese (S)	Hanyu Pinyin	Shanghainese Romanization	Population (2010)	Area (km^{2})
Bansongyuan Road Subdistrict	半淞园路街道	Bànsōngyuánlù Jiēdào	peu son yeu lu ka do	89,776	2.87
Huaihai Central Road Subdistrict	淮海中路街道	Huáihǎi Zhōnglù Jiēdào	wa he tzon lu ka do	57,931	1.41
Dapuqiao Subdistrict	打浦桥街道	Dǎpǔqiáo Jiēdào	tan phu djio ka do	59,085	1.59
Nanjing East Road Subdistrict	南京东路街道	Nánjīng Dōnglù Jiēdào	neu cin ton lu ka do	66,285	2.41
Laoximen Subdistrict	老西门街道	Lǎoxīmén Jiēdào	lo sij men ka do	72,898	1.24
Ruijin Second Road Subdistrict	瑞金二路街道	Ruìjīn Èrlù Jiēdào	zeu cin gnij lu ka do	49,360	1.98
Wuliqiao Subdistrict	五里桥街道	Wǔlǐqiáo Jiēdào	ng lij djio ka do	82,403	3.09
Xiaodongmen Subdistrict	小东门街道	Xiǎodōngmén Jiēdào	sio ton men ka do	74,994	2.59
Yuyuan Subdistrict	豫园街道	Yùyuán Jiēdào	yu yeu ka do	61,042	1.19

Note: Nanshi District and Luwan District were merged with the former Huangpu District in June 2000 and June 2011 respectively to form the current Huangpu District.

== History ==
Today's Huangpu District is the result of the merger of three long-standing districts of Shanghai: Nanshi, Huangpu and Luwan. Each of these have a distinct history and character.

=== Nanshi ===
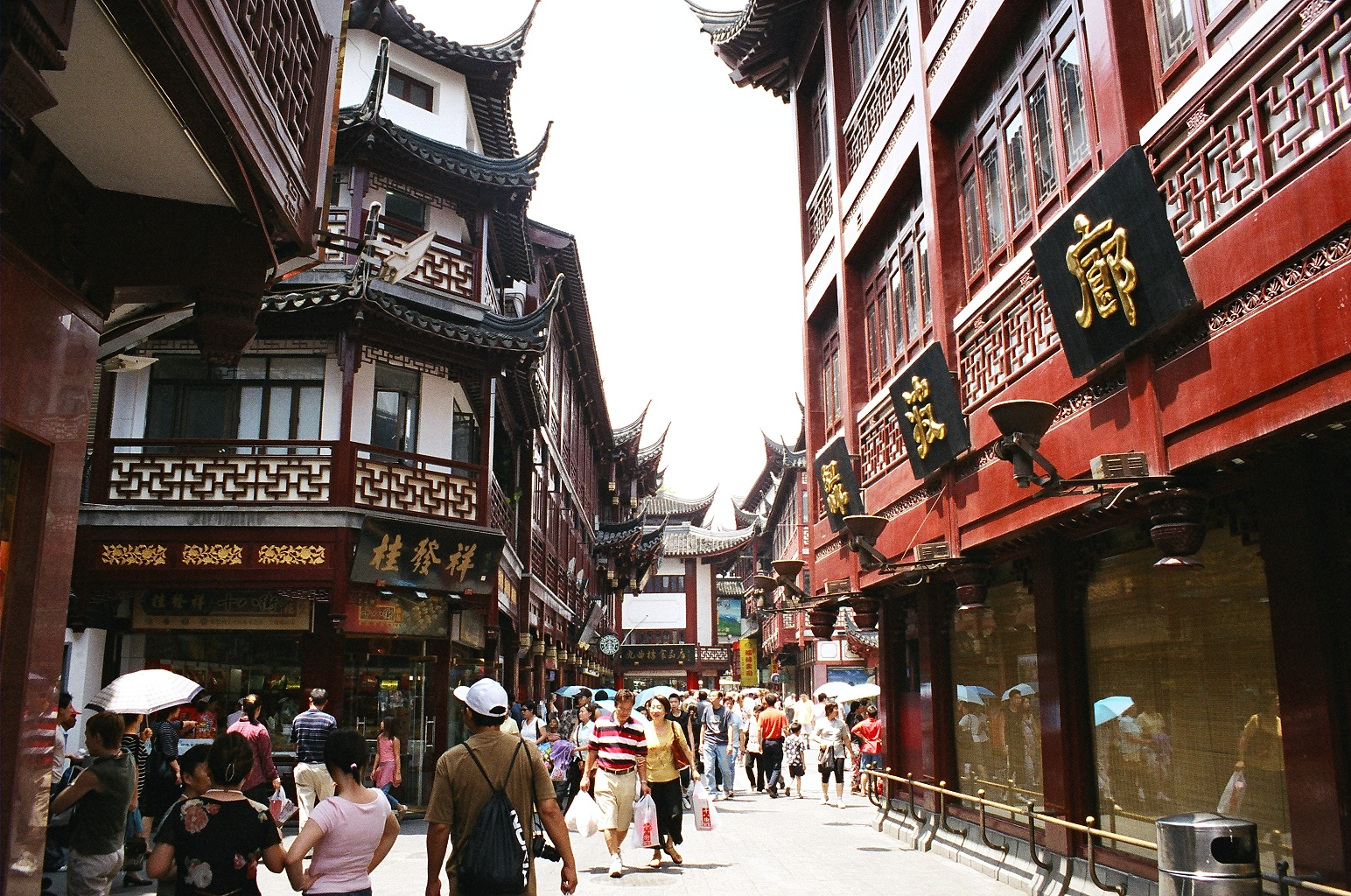
Commercial buildings near the City God Temple, in the former Nanshi District

The former Nanshi District, literally "southern city", was the historical core of Shanghai. It included the old, walled city as well as the nearby docklands on both sides of the Huangpu River. Shanghai County was established at the beginning of the Ming Dynasty. A city wall was built to repel the Wokou in 1553, and this Ming Dynasty wall defined the extent of urban Shanghai for the next few centuries.

In 1842, the area north of the old city was established as the British concession in Shanghai, which later became the Shanghai International Settlement. At the time, the concession was referred to by locals as the "northern city" while the walled Chinese city was the "southern city". From this reference was later derived the name Nanshi (Chinese: 南市; pinyin: Nánshì; Wugniu: noe^{2} zy^{4}; lit. 'Southern city'). Upon the defeat of Japan at the end of World War II, a unified municipal administration was established over urban Shanghai for the first time since the mid 19th century.

In 1945, after the Republic of China government took control, the old city was divided into the Third District (Yimiao District) and the Fourth District (Penglai District). In 1959 these were merged to form Nanshi District (with a small part of former Yimiao District merging into Luwan District).

=== Huangpu ===
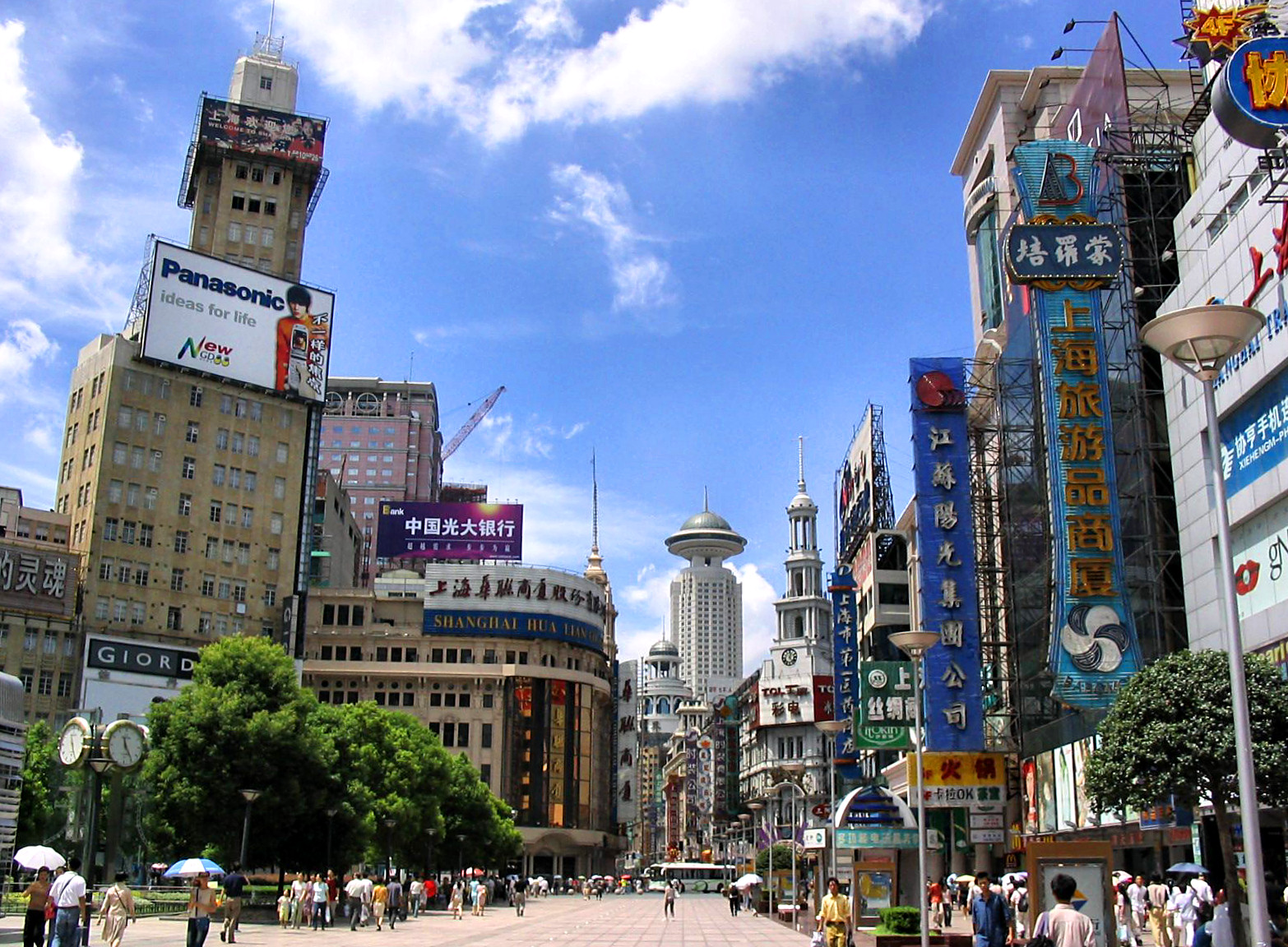
Nanjing Road pedestrian mall, perhaps the busiest retail street in the city, in the pre-merger Huangpu district

The pre-merger Huangpu District was largely located in the former Shanghai International Settlement. In the later part of the 19th century and the early 20th century, this area quickly became the commercial centre of Shanghai. The International Settlement was handed back to the Chinese government in 1943.

In 1945, after the Republic of China government took control, the south eastern part of the former International Settlement was divided into the First District (Huangpu District) and the Second District (Laozha District). Of these, the First District lay on the bank of the Huangpu River, and so was named after the river. In 1956, the two districts were merged to form a new and expanded Huangpu District.

Since 1943, the Shanghai Municipal Government has always been located in Huangpu District – first at the old Shanghai Municipal Council building, then in the old HSBC Building, and presently in a purpose-built building on People's Square.

=== Luwan ===
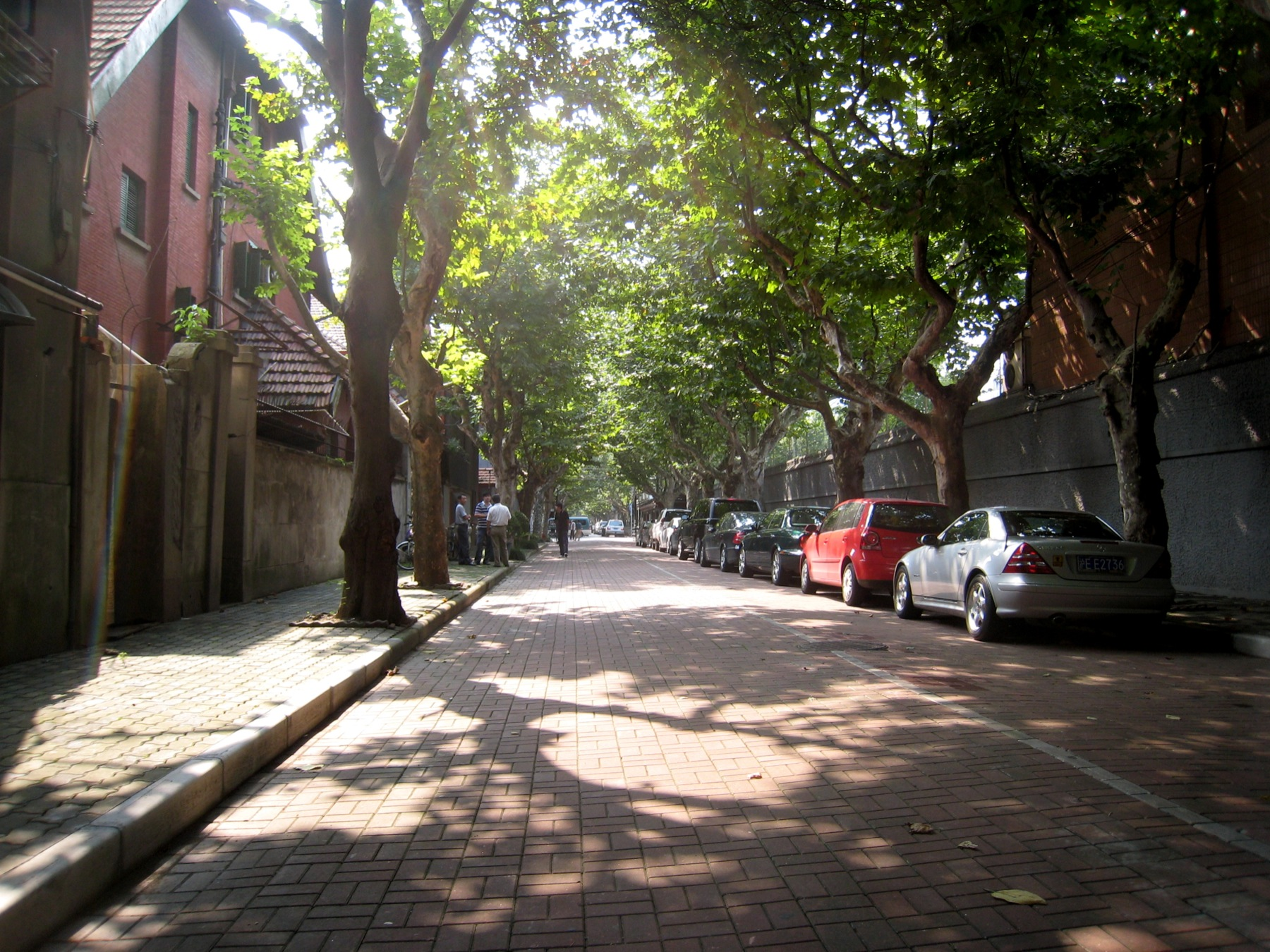
A quiet leafy street in the former Shanghai French Concession, part of which eventually became Luwan district

The former Luwan District occupied most of the eastern part of the former Shanghai French Concession and some nearby areas. This area was long regarded as the premier residential and high end commercial area of Shanghai. It is known for its leafy streets lined with London planes, cafes and restaurants, high end retail and historical houses.

In 1945, after the Republic of China government took control, the eastern-central part of the former French Concession was divided into the Fifth District (Taishan) and the Sixth District (Lujiawan), separated by South Chongqing Road and Luban Road. Of these, the Sixth District was named after Lokawei (simplified Chinese: 卢家湾; traditional Chinese: 盧家灣; pinyin: Lújiāwān; Wugniu: lu^{2} ka^{1} ue^{1}; lit. 'Lu Family Bay'), an area named after a bend on the Zhaojiabang creek. The main police depot and prison of the French concession was located here. In 1947, Taishan District was renamed "Songshan District".

In 1950, Lujiawan District was renamed "Luwan District". In 1956, Songshan District was merged into Luwan District. In 1959, part of former Yimiao District was also merged into Luwan District.

=== Merger in the 1990s and 2000s ===
The district boundaries remained largely unchanged between 1959 and 1993. In 1993, the part of Nanshi east of the Huangpu River was merged into the Pudong New District.

In 2000, the Shanghai Municipal Government abolished Nanshi District entirely, merging it into Huangpu District. In 2011, the merger of Luwan District with Huangpu District was announced. On June 8, 2011, it was announced that the proposed plan of merging Luwan and Huangpu Districts had been approved by the State Council.

== Features ==
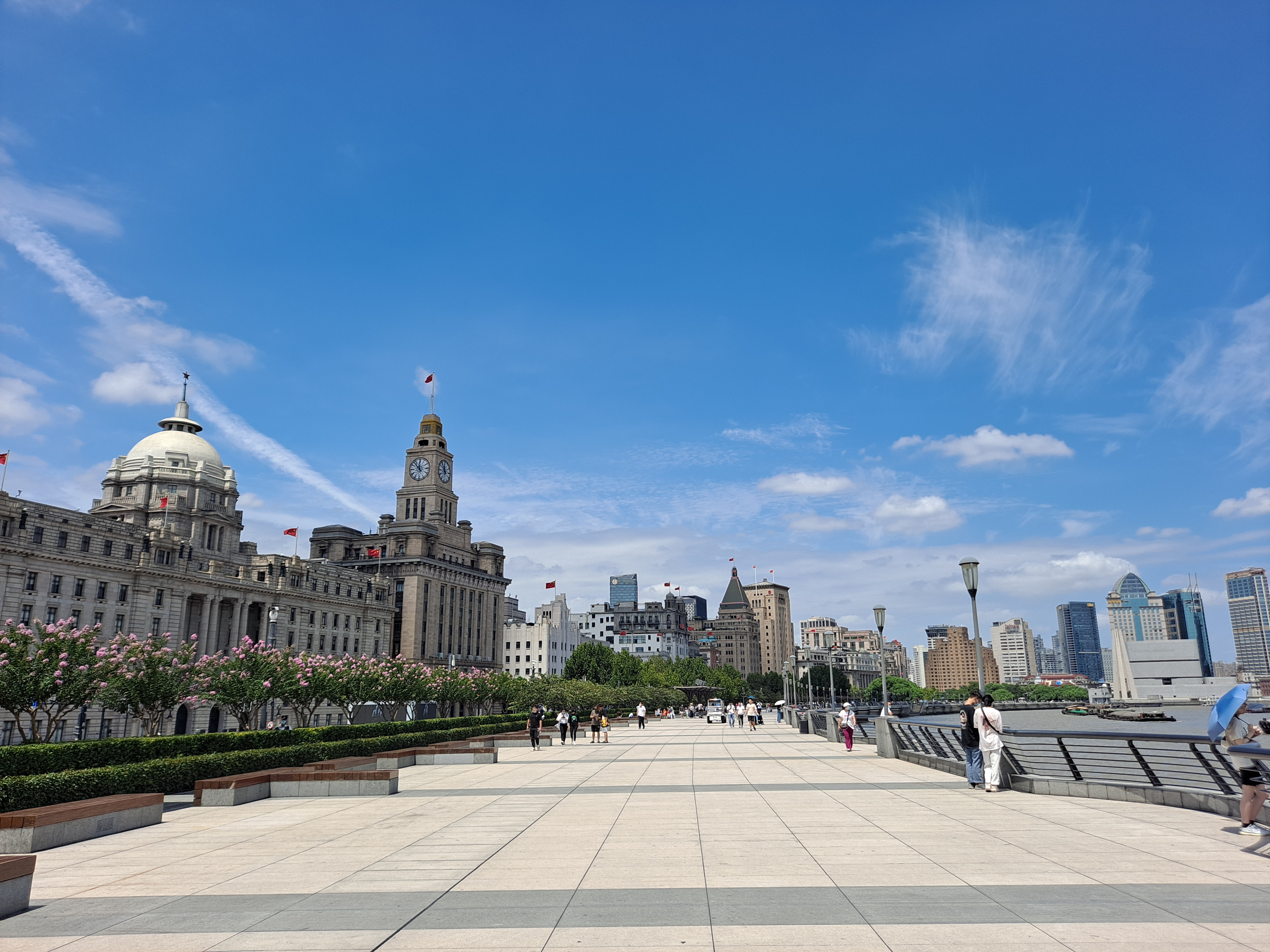
The Bund

Despite the mergers, the three previous districts which make up today's Huangpu District retain their distinct characters.

=== Huangpu ===
The pre-merger Huangpu District was long the commercial centre of Shanghai. Along the Huangpu riverfront were located the major docks of Shanghai. Behind the docks, on the Bund, were offices of major financial institutions and trading houses. Extending from the Bund westward are several major commercial streets. These include the East Nanjing Road, popular with visitors from around the country. Fuzhou Road is the centre of bookselling in Shanghai, featuring large scale general and specialist book shops and publishers.

The People's Square, previously the Shanghai race course, is now the site of the Shanghai Grand Theatre, Shanghai Museum, Shanghai Art Museum, and the Shanghai Urban Planning Exhibition Hall. The Shanghai Natural History Museum is also located in Huangpu District.

=== Nanshi ===
The old Nanshi district is the old, walled city of Shanghai, and retains a number of important sights, including City God Temple and the nearby Yuyuan Garden. The old city is undergoing extensive redevelopment, with the existing houses being replaced by high rise apartment buildings as well as modern constructions with traditional Chinese style facades. The boundaries of the walled city can still be traced in the form of a wide ring road built over the course of the old city wall and moat. The city wall has almost entirely been demolished, except for one tower and a short section of wall attached to it, which survived because the tower was converted into a temple in the medieval period.

=== Luwan ===
The old Luwan district was a part of the old French Concession area, traditionally one of the most prestigious sections of the city. It was famous for its boulevards lined with plane trees, which had been imported over 100 years ago. Despite rampant redevelopment, the district retains a distinct character and is a tourist attraction in itself. The district included the historical residences of Sun Yat-sen, Mao Zedong, Zhou Enlai, Agnes Smedley, and Mei Lanfang, among many others. Huaihai Road is the major commercial thoroughfare in this part of the city.

== Economy ==
Huangpu is the district with the highest GDP per capita (621,500 CHY, around 86,319 USD) in Shanghai as of 2023, almost doubled compared to the second place (Changning District). Huangpu District is the only entire CAZ (Central Activity Zone) district. The Huangpu District also has the highest housing price per square meter in Shanghai. Due to its special location, some famous companies also have their headquarters in Huangpu. For example, the headquarters of Xiaohongshu are in Huangpu District.

== Government and infrastructure ==
The Hong Kong Economic and Trade Office in Shanghai is in The Headquarters Building in Huangpu District.

== Transportation ==
=== Main Roads ===
(Huangpu District Parts)

- Yan'an Elevated Road (Shaanxi N/S Road - Zhongshan East 1st/2nd Road)
- North–South Elevated Road (Suzhou Creek - Huangpu River)
- Inner Ring Elevated Road (Ruijin S Road/Rihui E Road - Nanpu Bridge)

=== Shanghai Ferry ===
- Dongjin Line (East Jinling Road - Dongchang Road)
- Dongfu Line (East Fuxing Road - Dongchang Road)
- Yangfu Line (East Fuxing Road - Yangjiadu)
- Tangdong Line (Dongjiadu - Tangqiao)
- Nanlu Line (Lujiabang Road - Nanmatou)

=== Shanghai Metro ===
Huangpu is currently served and/or under construction by nine metro lines operated by Shanghai Metro, metro lines and/or metro stations which are in company with "*" mean they are currently under construction:

- Line 1 – South Shaanxi Road 10 12 , South Huangpi Road 14 , People's Square 2 8 , Xinzha Road
- Line 2 – People's Square 1 8 , East Nanjing Road 10
- Line 4 – Nanpu Bridge, South Xizang Road 8 , Luban Road
- Line 8 – People's Square 1 2 , Dashijie 14 , Laoximen 10 , Lujiabang Road 9 , South Xizang Road 4
- Line 9 – Dapuqiao, Madang Road 13 , Lujiabang Road 8 , Xiaonanmen
- Line 10 – South Shaanxi Road 1 12 , Xintiandi 13 , Laoximen 8 , Yuyuan Garden 14 , East Nanjing Road 2
- Line 12 - South Shaanxi Road station 1 10
- Line 13 - Middle Huaihai Road station, Xintiandi station 10 , Madang Road 9 , World Expo Museum
- Line 14 - South Huangpi Road 1 , Dashijie 8 , Yuyuan Garden 10

== See also ==
- Old City of Shanghai
- Shanghai International Settlement
- Shanghai French Concession and Luwan District
- All Saints Church, Shanghai
