= Site of the First CPC National Congress · Xintiandi station =

Shanghai Metro interchange station

Site of the First CPC National Congress · Xintiandi 一大会址·新天地
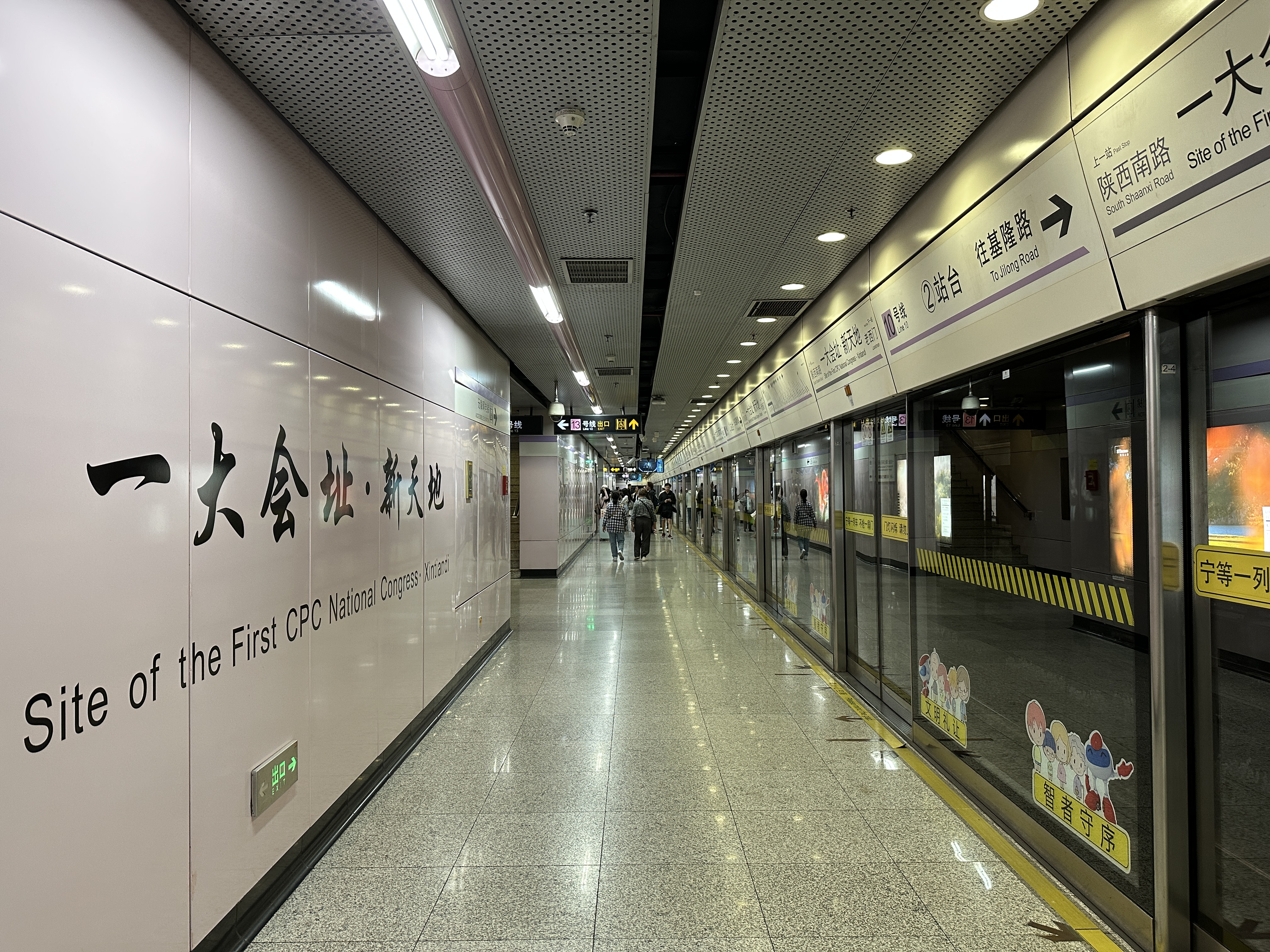
- Platform 2 (Line 10 towards Jilong Road)

General information
- Location: Middle Fuxing Road and Madang Road; Huangpu District, Shanghai, Zhejiang; China
- Coordinates: 31°13′6″N 121°28′12″E
- System: Shanghai Metro station
- Operator: Shanghai No. 1/2 Metro Operation Co. Ltd.
- Lines: Line 10; Line 13
- Platforms: 4 (1 island platform for Line 13 and 2 side platforms for Line 10)
- Tracks: 4

Construction
- Structure type: Underground
- Platform levels: 2
- Accessible: Yes

History
- Opened: 10 April 2010 (Line 10); 19 December 2014 (Line 13)
- Former names: Xintiandi (up to 20 June 2021)

Services
Preceding station	Shanghai Metro	Following station
South Shaanxi Road towards Hongqiao Railway Station or Hangzhong Road	Line 10	Laoximen towards Jilong Road
Middle Huaihai Road towards Jinyun Road	Line 13	Madang Road towards Zhangjiang Road
Location

Site of the First CPC National Congress · Xintiandi (Chinese: 一大会址·新天地; pinyin: Yīdà Huìzhǐ Xīntiāndì) is an interchange station between Shanghai Metro Lines 10 and 13, located in the Xintiandi shopping area of Huangpu District. Line 10 service commenced on 10 April 2010, while line 13 service commenced on 19 December 2015.

On 20 June 2021, to celebrate the 100th Anniversary of the Chinese Communist Party, the station name changed from Xintiandi Station to Site of the First CPC National Congress · Xintiandi Station.

== Station layout ==
1F	Ground level	Exits
B1	Concourse	Tickets, Service Center
B2	Side platform, doors open on the right
B2	Platform 1	← Line 10 towards Hongqiao Railway Station or Hangzhong Road (South Shaanxi Road)
B2	Platform 2	Line 10 towards Jilong Road (Laoximen) →
B2	Side platform, doors open on the right
B3	Platform 3	← Line 13 towards Jinyun Road (Middle Huaihai Road)
B3	Island platform, doors open on the left
B3	Platform 4	Line 13 towards Zhangjiang Road (Madang Road) →

=== Entrances/exits ===
- 1: Fuxing Road (M), Madang Road
- 2: Fuxing Road (M), Huangpi Road (S)
- 3: Madang Road
- 4: Madang Road, Hefei Road
- 5: Fuxing Road (M), Danshui Road
- 6: Fuxing Road (M), Madang Road

== See also ==
- Site of the First National Congress of the Chinese Communist Party
