= Shikumen =

Shanghainese architectural style first appearing in the 1860s

- Traditional Chinese: 石庫門
- Simplified Chinese: 石库门
- Wungiu: zaq^{8} khu^{5} men^{2}
- Literal meaning: "stone warehouse gate"
Transcriptions
Standard Mandarin
- Hanyu Pinyin: shíkùmén
Wu
- Wugniu: zaq^{8} khu^{5} men^{2}
- IPA: [zàʔ kʰù mə̌n] (Shanghainese)
Yue: Cantonese
- Yale Romanization: sehk fu mùhn
- Jyutping: sek^{6} fu^{3} mun^{4}
- IPA: [sɛ̀ːk̚ fūː mȕːn]

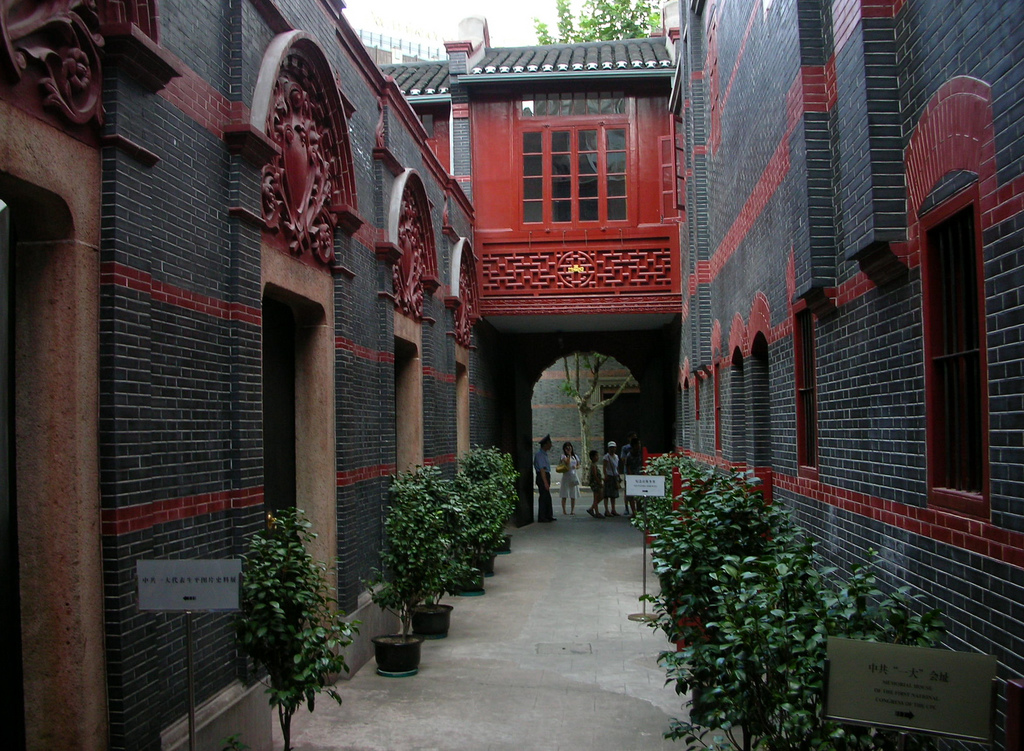
A preserved longdang at the site of the First National Congress of the Chinese Communist Party, showing the "stone gates" (at left) whence the name shikumen arose.

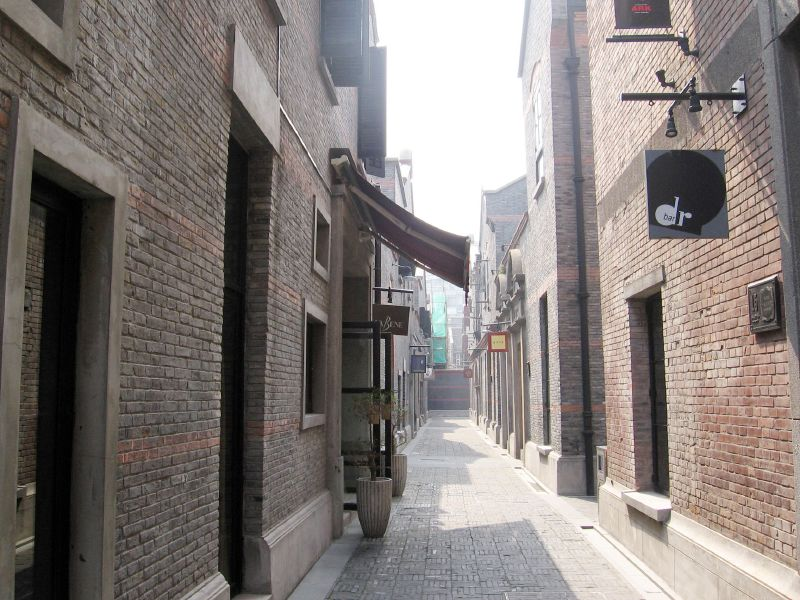
Renovated shikumen lanes in Xintiandi.

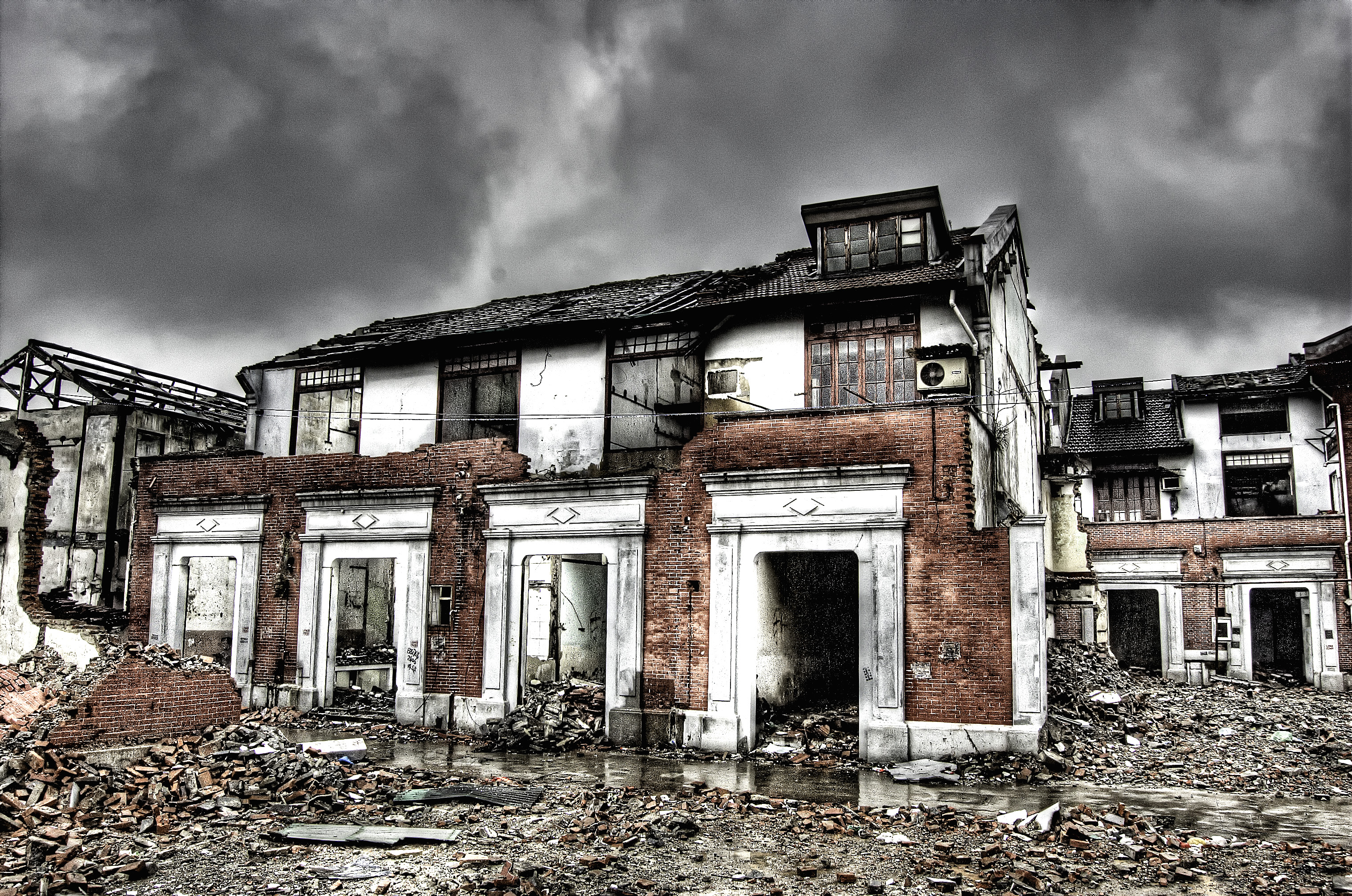
Shikumen buildings in the process of demolition in 2007 – a fate that has befallen many buildings of this type.

Shikumen (simplified Chinese: 石库门; traditional Chinese: 石庫門; pinyin: Shíkùmén; lit. 'Stone Warehouse Gate', Shanghainese: zaq^{8} khu^{5} men^{6}, IPA: [zᴀʔ˩ kʰu˩ mən˨˦]) is a traditional Shanghainese architectural style combining Western and Chinese elements that first appeared in the 1860s.

The term Chinese: 石库门 is derived from the Shanghainese dialect Chinese: 石箍门, Chinese: 箍 meaning "to frame or encase." Chinese: 石箍门 referred to the characteristically "stone-framed door" of the tenement houses. At the height of their popularity, there were 9,000 shikumen-style buildings in Shanghai, comprising 60% of the total housing stock of the city; however, the proportion is currently much lower, as most Shanghainese live in large apartment buildings. Shikumen is classified as one type of lilong residences, sometimes translated as "lane houses" in English.

In 2010, "construction techniques of shikumen lilong architecture" was recognised by the Chinese government on the national non-physical cultural heritage register (no. VIII-210).

Shikumen houses were also introduced to other port cities in China. For example, many were built in the foreign concessions of Hankou (now part of Wuhan), and some can still be seen there today. Shikumen terraces can even be found as far afield as Beijing, where the two shikumen lanes Huakang Li and Tai’an Li, dating from the 1920s, are undergoing restoration.

== Structure ==
Shikumens are two or three-story structures resembling Western terrace houses or townhouses, distinguished by high brick walls enclosing a narrow front yard. The name "stone gate" references these strong gateways.

Each residence abuts another and all are arranged in straight side alleys called longtang (Chinese: 弄堂; pinyin: Lòngtáng, Shanghainese: lon^{6} daon^{6}, IPA: [loŋ¹¹ dɑ̃²⁴], sometimes written as 衖堂). The entrance to each alley is usually surmounted by a stylistic stone arch.

The shikumen is a cultural blend of the elements found in Western architecture with traditional Lower Yangtze architecture and social behavior. Traditional Chinese dwellings had a courtyard, and the Shikumen was no exception. Yet, to compromise with its urban nature, it was much smaller and provided an interior haven to the commotions in the streets, allowing for raindrops to fall and vegetation to grow freely within a residence. The courtyard also allowed sunlight and improved ventilation into the rooms.

== History ==
=== Origin ===
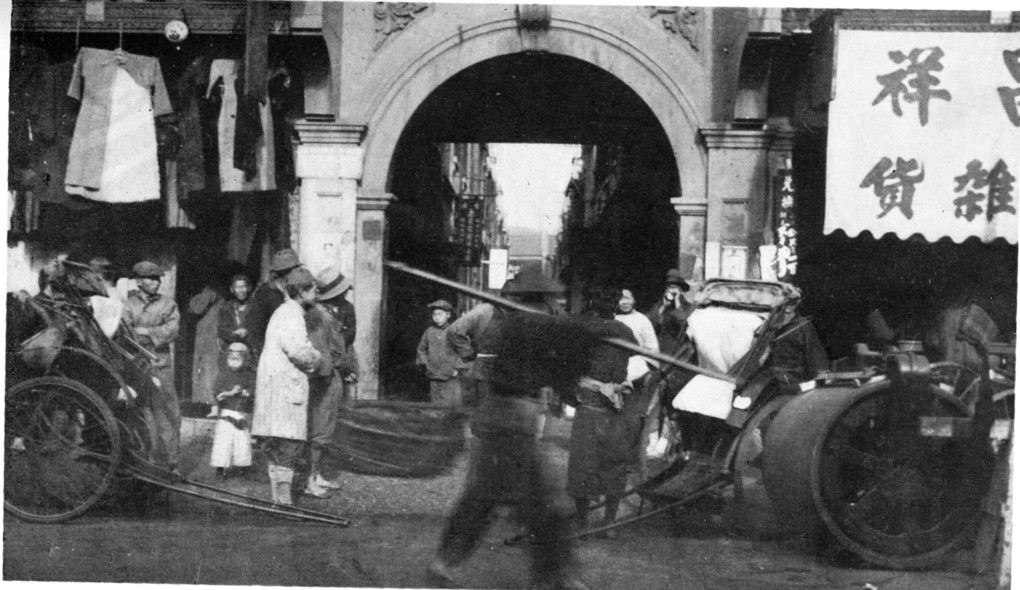
A historic photograph of the entrance of a shikumen lane or longdang

This style of housing originally developed when local developers adapted Western-style terrace houses to Chinese conditions. Migrant labourers from surrounding provinces entered Shanghai in large numbers with the establishment of Shanghai as a treaty port in 1843. The 1853 Small Swords Rebellion and the Taiping Revolution drove more migrants and refugees into Shanghai. With the upsurge in demand, property developers began to build a large number of residential buildings for the new Chinese residents of the city. At first, these tended to be wooden buildings that were cheap and quick to build. These wooden buildings were built as terraces, and usually name with "Li" (里, Shanghainese: li^{6}) as suffix. These were the first "lilong" buildings in Shanghai. Within 10 months from 1853, 800 dwellings of this type were built.

Because of their flammability, this type of construction was banned by concession authorities in Shanghai. However, with a burgeoning property development market in Shanghai, developers adapted these wooden terraces into the Shikumen. They used the traditional Chinese "litie" technique of wooden frame and load-bearing brick veneer construction, and for each residence used the traditional three-sided courtyard or four-sided courtyard layouts commonly found in the Jiangnan region.

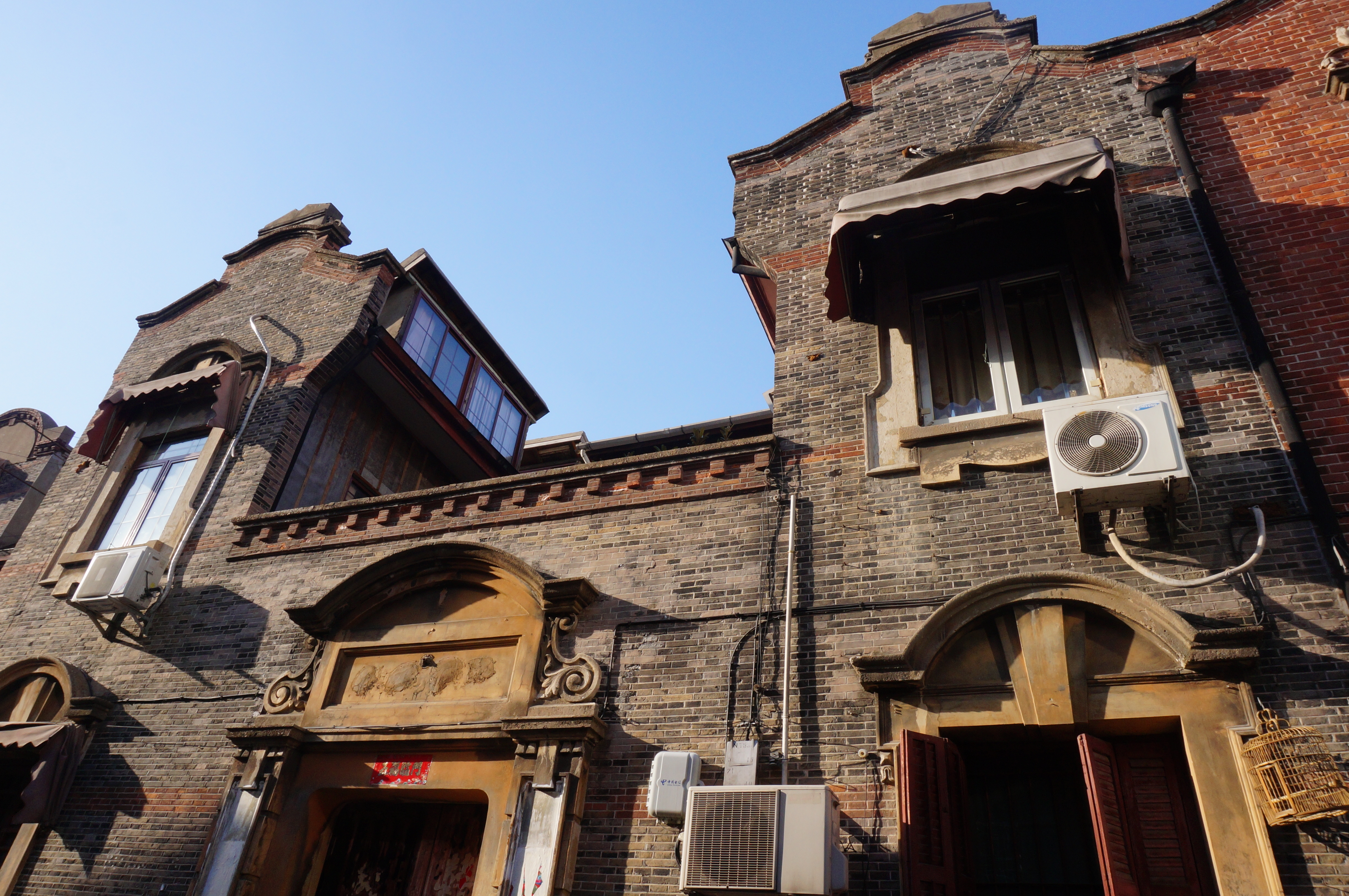
Exterior of a shikumen residence, in the Chang Garden (张园) development

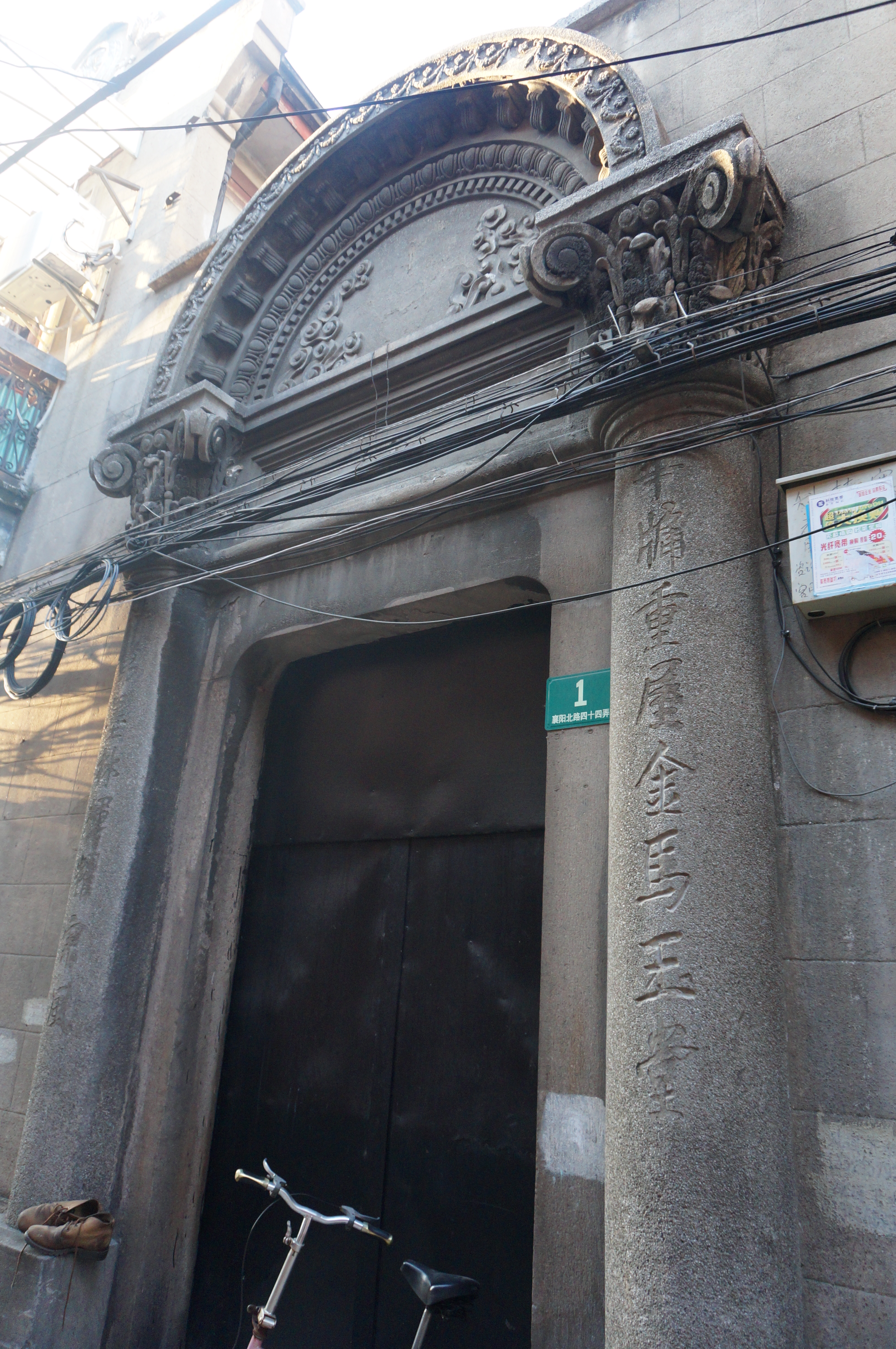
A relatively elaborate "stone gate" with an archivolt and pediment, and columns inscribed with a couplet, from a Shikumen residence on North Xiangyang Road

=== Development ===
Shikumen residences had a much smaller footprint than traditional courtyard residences, and were accessed by narrow lanes. They were also cheaper to build than Western-style houses. Although more expensive to build than the wooden terraces they replaced, they were sturdier and so attracted higher rents. They were first built in the British concession (later part of the International Settlement; and still later, the pre-merger Huangpu District), but quickly became popular throughout the Old City and Chinese zones, and came to become the predominant form of residential construction in Shanghai. The high profit attracted a whole swathe of property companies to enter the shikumen market.

From the 1910s, various innovations were made to the shikumen in response to social change. With a burgeoning middle class, designers increased the width of lanes between terraces, but the width of each dwelling decreased - from a three-bay hall and two side wings (as was standard in the 19th century) to a two-bay or one-bay hall, and one side wing. Decorations became more elaborate: the main doors of the houses acquired the characteristic elaborate lintels, featuring architraves, archivolts and pediments. By around 1919, increasing population pressures and an increasing wealth gap encouraged the development of smaller, but better equipped, "new type" shikumen. "New type" shikumen were three storeys tall instead of two, and were equipped with modern sanitary equipment. Great emphasis was placed on natural lighting, with most shikumen orientated towards the south, and an internal staircase skylight or atrium to supplement the front and back courtyards. Developments became larger, with a trunk lane leading off the street, and branch lanes leading off the trunk lane. Cars became more popular, so the trunk lanes were typically designed to accommodate cars.

=== Later history ===
The heyday of the "new type" shikumen was in the 1920s. From the 1930s they were replaced by newer building types, including newer types of lilong residences, as well as larger modern apartment buildings, before the civil war and the Second Sino-Japanese War completely disrupted the property market in Shanghai.

It was common for families who could not afford the rent on a whole house to sub-let some of the rooms. They were known as "second landlords" (二房东, èr fángdōng) (as opposed to the head-landlord (大房东, dà fángdōng)). "Second landlords" often lived in the same shikumen residence with their tenants. The phenomenon blossomed after the start of the Second Sino-Japanese War: with refugees rushing into the unoccupied concessions from the Chinese zones in Hongkou and Zhabei, and further afield, there was dramatically increased demand for housing in the concessions. "Second landlords" used increasingly creative ways to sub-divide rooms and build add-ons and lean-tos in the courtyards and on the terraces. Shikumen residences became known for being crowded and disorderly. It was not uncommon for a single shikumen residence to be inhabited by dozens of families. A famous satirical comedy of the time, set in one of these houses, was called "The 72 Tenant Families" (《七十二家房客》).

=== Use ===
Although designed to be residential, other types of enterprises often operated from shikumen buildings as well, hidden within longtang developments. These include money lenders, traders, scribes, factories, entertainment venues and even schools. For example, one larger shikumen development, Xingren Li, featured more than 20 money lenders. Often, traders would use the ground floor rooms for storage, and live in the upper floors. Chemical and dye dealers were common. Even light industry was found within shikumen communities, such as sock factories and cosmetics factories. Even more common (and common even today in surviving and renovated shikumen lanes) are grocers, restaurants, inns and bath houses.

Densely populated shikumen neighbourhoods provided camouflage for revolutionaries. The Chinese Communist Party held its first conference in a shikumen residence in Shude Li, and its second conference in another shikumen residence in the French Concession. The Communist Youth League first operated out of a shikumen residence on Avenue Joffre.

Shikumen neighbourhoods were also often used for less salubrious trades. The lanes Huile Li and Qunyu Fang, on Foochow Road (now Fuzhou Road), formed the epicentre of Shanghai's red light district before 1949. Gambling and opium dens commonly appeared in shikumen neighbourhoods, along with fortune tellers.

=== Demise ===
By the late 1930s, shikumen buildings were already on their way out, overtaken by newer styles of lilong residences, and large apartment buildings. Commercial property development in Shanghai virtually ceased during the Second World War and the Chinese Civil War that followed it. After the end of the war 1949, shikumen construction ceased completely, replaced with planned construction of residential buildings on collectivist principles. In the early 1950s, it was calculated that there were more than 9000 shikumen buildings, comprising 65% of residential housing stock by area in Shanghai. While constructions of new residential buildings decreased this percentage over time, most shikumen neighbourhoods remained unchanged in their crowded state until economic reforms in the 1980s and 90s began the wave of demolition and reconstruction which, by the early 21st century, has left only a few shikumen developments intact. In Xuhui District alone, it has been calculated that shikumen residences had decreased from 2.68 million square metres in 1949, to 0.25 million square metres by the late 1990s. The forced demolition of crowded and stable shikumen communities gave rise to controversies, such as a 2005 incident where a real estate developer resorted to arson to persuade residents to leave, resulting in the death of two elderly residents.

== Classification and architecture ==
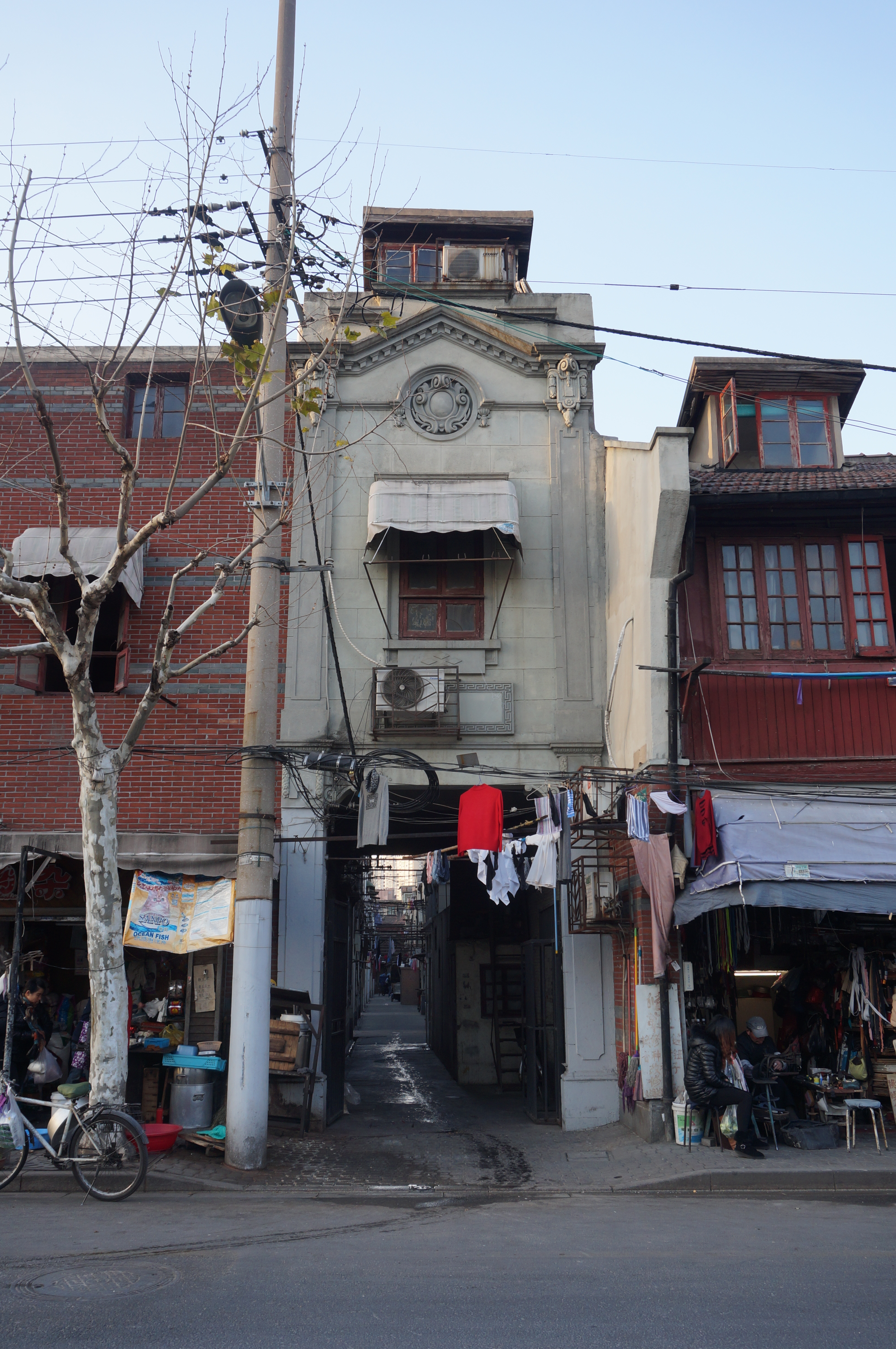
An entrance to a shikumen lilong on Shanhaiguan Road

Architectural historians classify shikumen into two types, the "old type" and the "new type". The old type was predominantly built from the 1860s until the end of the First World War, while the new type prevailed from after the First World War until the development of shikumen ceased after 1949. Old type shikumen is further divided into an early period and a late period.

The defining characteristic of a shikumen building is the prominent main gate - which also gives rise to the name "shikumen". Typically, this gate is located on the central axis of each dwelling, with twin doors made of heavy wood, painted glossy black. Typical width is around 1.4 metres, with a height of around 2.8 metres. The doors usually possess brass or iron knockers. The original documented name for such buildings was "shigumen" (石箍門, Shanghainese: zaq⁸ ku¹ men⁶), which in Shanghainese Wu meant "gate framed with stone", but over time corrupted into the similar-sounding "shikumen". Each individual dwelling displays typical characteristics of traditional Jiangnan architecture, while the layout of the development as a whole is adopted from Western terrace houses.

=== Old type ===
==== Early period ====
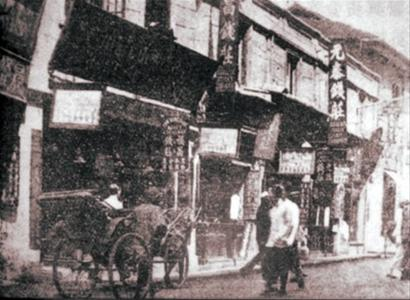
An old image of Xingren Li (street front buildings pictured), a typical early old type shikumen development from the early period, Lane 120, Ningbo Road, Huangpu District. Photoed in 1872.

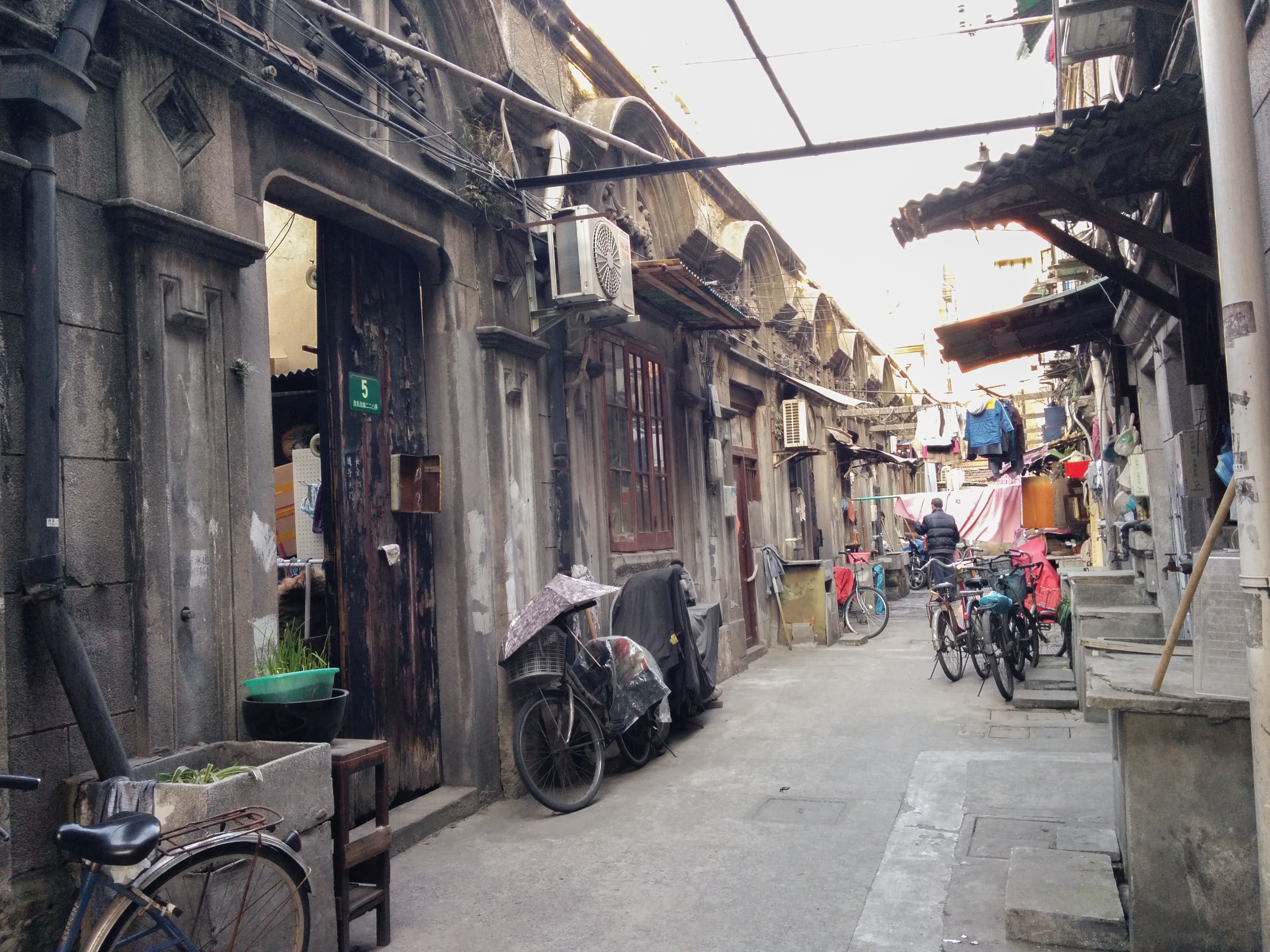
A shikumen lane in Zhenxing Li

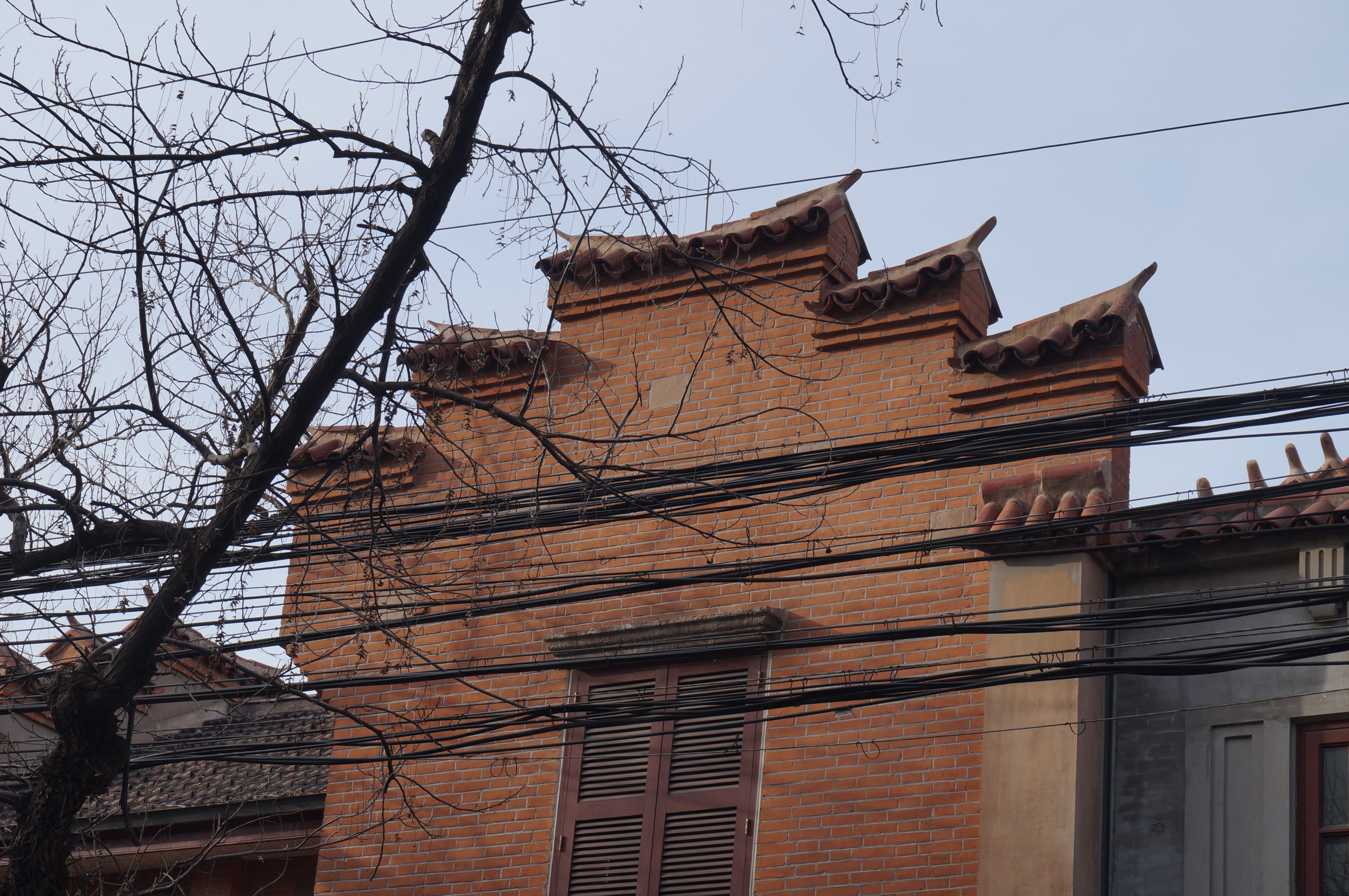
A traditional Chinese matou ("horse head") style gable - more typical of old type shikumen - seen at Jianye Li, a new type shikumen development.

Early period old type shikumen were built between 1869 and 1910. They retained more of the style of traditional Chinese houses, but with a much condensed footprint. There are typically 3 to 5 bays to each dwelling, and two storeys. They used the traditional litie (立帖) (or "brick nogging") style of brick veneer for load-bearing walls. The houses possessed walls of equal height at the front and back, so that each dwelling (despite being part of a terrace) was an enclosed whole, separated from the outside world. This made them popular with the upper end of the residential property market.

The early period shikumen also possessed more features of traditional Chinese architecture: on the external façade of the terrace there are often typically Chinese matou ("horse head") style or Guanyin dou ("Guanyin hood") style gables; the main hall uses floor-to-ceiling windows; decorative boards below eaves; and grid windows on the side wings. However, in contrast to later shikumen buildings, the gates of early period shikumen were not elaborately decorated, and were simply framed in stone. In terms of layout, the shikumen of this period were arranged in lanes of about 3 metres wide - narrower than later buildings - and the attention to orientation, and organization of trunk lanes and branch lanes, both features of later shikumen, were also absent.

In terms of internal lay-out, immediately within the main gate is the front courtyard (tianjing 天井), flanked by wings (xiangfang 厢房) of the house on the left and right. At the centre, facing the courtyard is the hall, or ketang jian (客堂间). This large room typically has an area of about 12 square metres, and is used like a modern sitting room or living room. On either side of the hall are the cijian (次间) or "secondary rooms". Stairs to reach the first floor are located behind the cijian. Behind the hall and the cijian is the back courtyard (houtianjing 后天井), which is about half the size of the front courtyard. The well, which provided water for the house, was located here (though later houses were connected to tap water instead). At the back of the back courtyard are back buildings, usually used as the kitchen, toilet and storage room. On the whole, each dwelling preserved the main features required for traditional Chinese day-to-day living, while saving the land required.

Most early period old style shikumen have been demolished or rebuilt. Representative examples include the Xingren Li, built in 1872 (demolished 1980), and Mianyang Li and Jixiang Li, both located near the Shiliupu dock area.

==== Late period ====
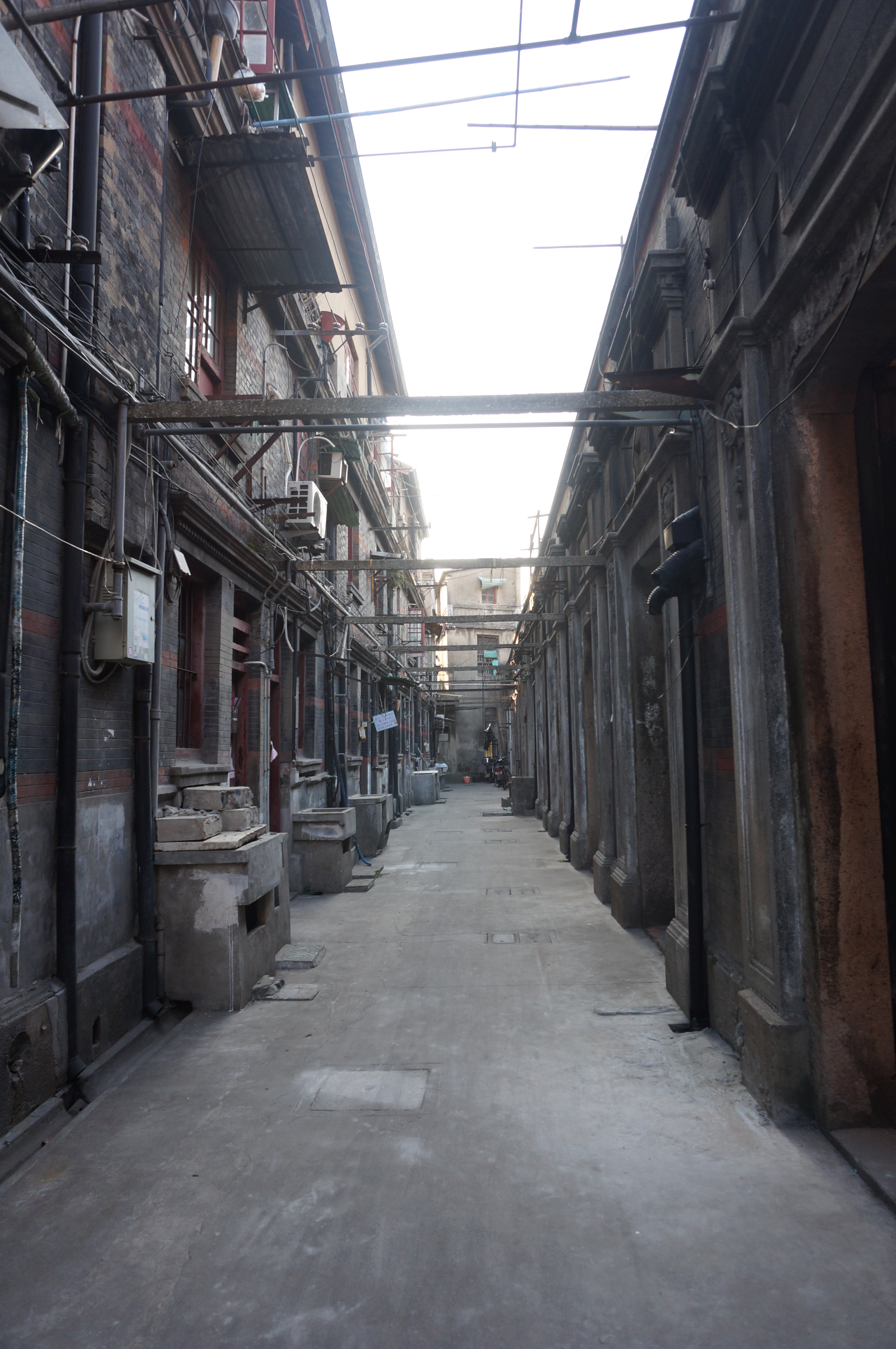
An empty lane in East Siwen Li, just before demolition began

Late period shikumen were mostly built between 1910 and 1919. The three-bay wide frontage with two side wings was reduced to one- or two-bay wide, with one side wing. The back courtyard was reduced, but more attention was paid to natural lighting, and the laneways were widened. More Western architectural details found favour: bannisters, doors and windows, staircase, pillar capitals and arch buttresses all used Western decorative styles. The lintel of the main gate also became increasingly elaborate, decorated with semicircular archivolts, triangular pediments or rectangular architraves.

Late period old type shikumen are far better preserved than early period examples. Representative examples include the west and east Siwen Li (in the process of being demolished), north Shude Li, and Daqing Li, built in 1915. One of the few old type shikumen developments to be preserved largely intact is Bugao Li, or Cité Bourgogne (built in the 1930s), in the former French Concession.

=== New type ===
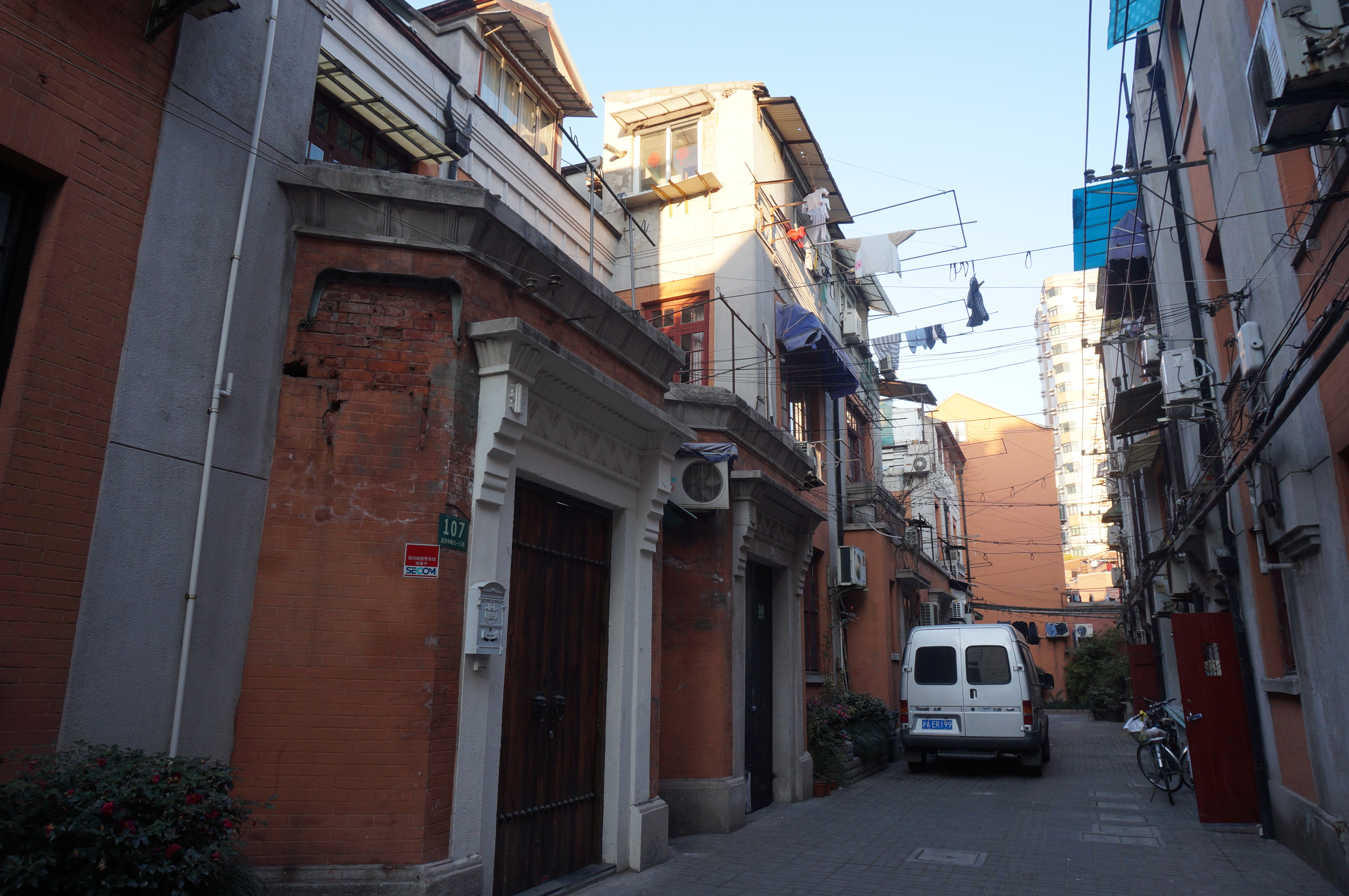
A branch lane in Siming Cun, showing the characteristic gate leading to a residence.

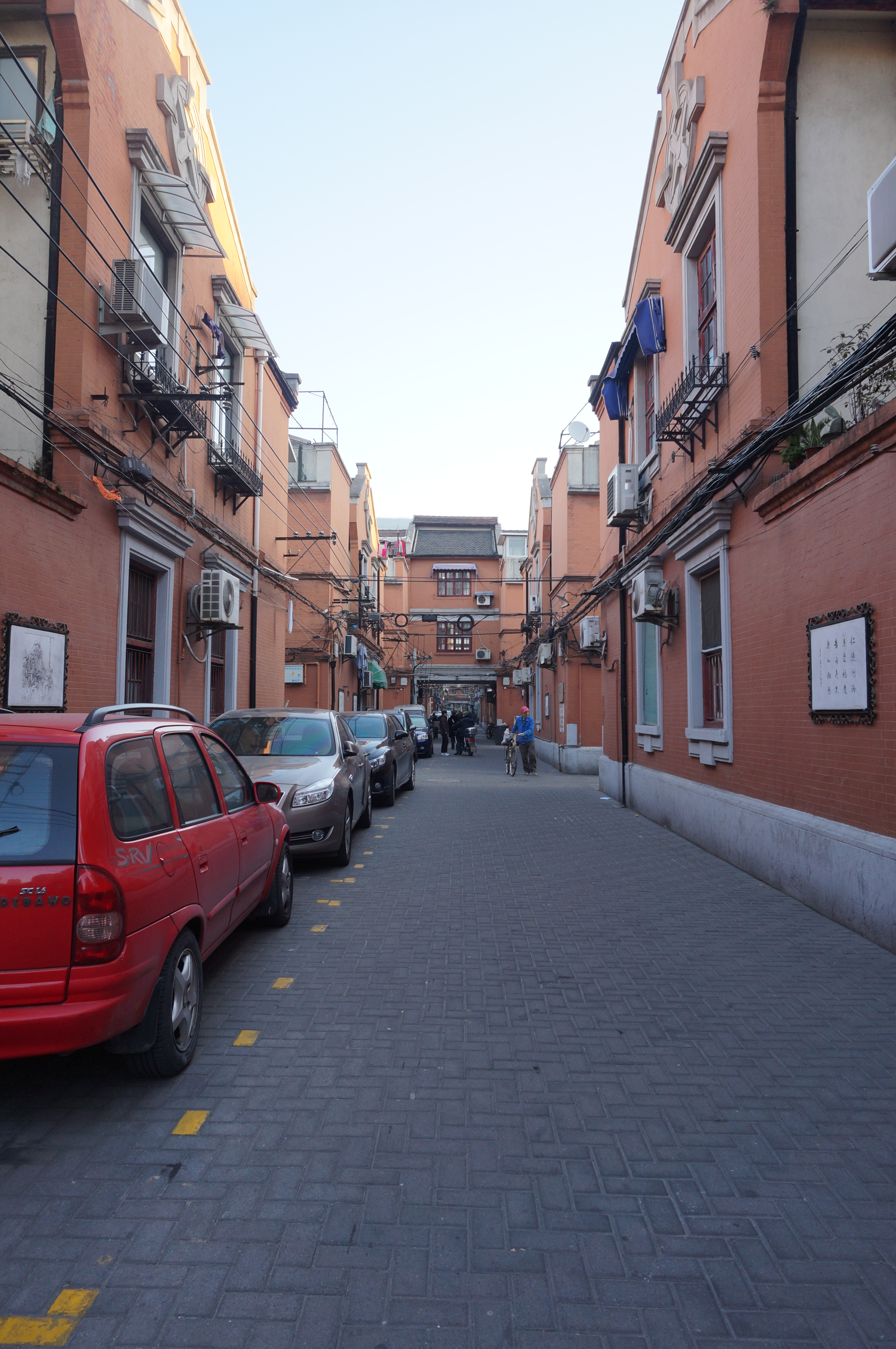
The trunk lane of Siming Cun, a new type shikumen

New type shikumen were typically built from 1919 to the 1930s. They were also called "reformed style" shikumen residences. The main structural difference between new type and old type shikumen is that new style buildings are three storeys high. They were built of reinforced concrete, rather than brick veneer. Some were equipped with modern sanitary equipment, and natural lighting became a key concern. Developments are typically laid out with a main, trunk lane, with houses arranged along branch lanes leading from the trunk lane. With the advent of motor cars, the trunk lanes were usually built wide enough to accommodate cars. Instead of one lane with one or two rows of houses, new style shikumen were typically developed in large blocks. Standard triangular gables and party walls replaced the more elaborate matou or Guanyin dou styles, with concrete tops. Exposed brick was used for external walls. The main gate frame also switched from stone to brick and painted stone cladding. The architectural style became far more Westernised overall.

Each dwelling was one to two bays wide. Two-bay wide houses "inherited" only one side wing, while one-bay wide houses discarded wings completely. Stairs became less steep. The new second floor typically contained bedrooms, along with a front and a back terrace (shaitai, 晒台). The ground floor were equipped with kitchens (zaopi jian 灶批间). At the back of the house, a "back wing" was added, as well as the tingzi jian (亭子间) or "pergola room", located above the kitchen and below the terrace. This was typically small, with low ceilings, and faced north, making it the least attractive room in the house. They were usually used for storage, or as living quarters for servants.

Numerous new type shikumen have survived. Some well known examples include Jianye Li (now revamped into an upmarket hotel, commercial and residential complex), Siming Cun, and Mingde Li located on Avenue Joffre.

== Names ==
In Chinese, shikumen developments are typically named with a suffix of Li (里, "neighbourhood"), Fang (坊, "ward"), Long (弄, "lane") or Cun (邨, "village"). The first two are traditional suffixes for names of urban precincts, in common use since at least the Tang dynasty. Where an English name was used, "Terrace" was a common suffix.

The first part of the name typically derives from one of three sources. The first kind takes the name of the freeholder or related party: for example Siming Cun is named after the Chinese name ("Siming Bank") of the project's main sponsor, the Ningpo Commercial & Savings Bank; similarly, Meilan Fang takes one syllable from each of the two owners' names - brothers Wu Meixi and Wu Silan. The second kind takes the name of a nearby road or landmark, for example Bao'an Fang is named after the nearby Temple to the Bao'an Situ. The third type uses an auspicious words: such as Jixiang Li ("auspicious"), Ruyi Li ("happiness") and Ping'an Li ("safety"). The Chinese name for Cité Bourgogne, Bugao Li, is both phonetically similar to the French name and has an auspicious meaning of "stepping upwards".

The names are typically inscribed, along with the year of construction, on the arch above the lane entrance.

== Notable shikumen neighbourhoods today ==
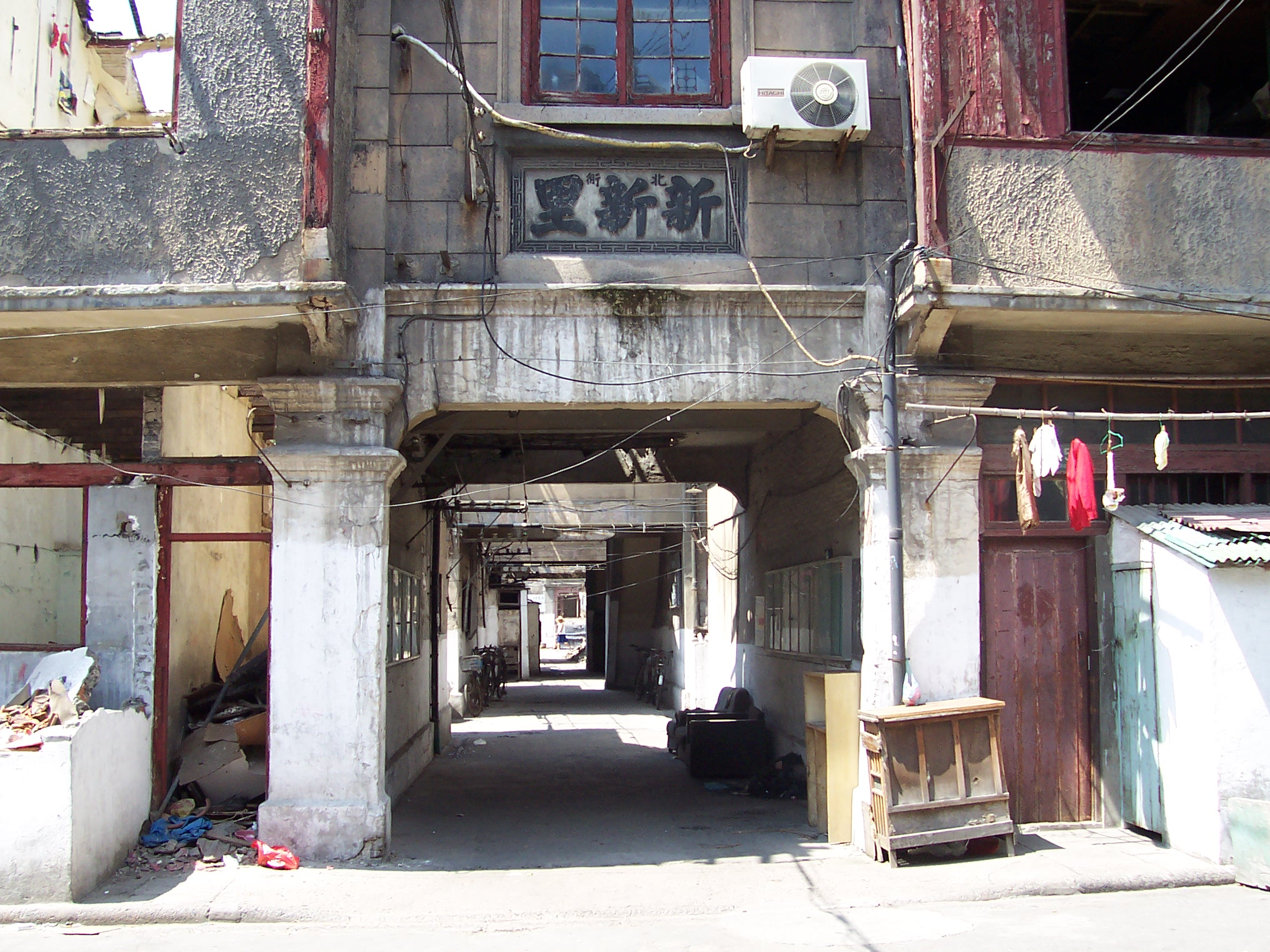
Xinxin Li under demolition

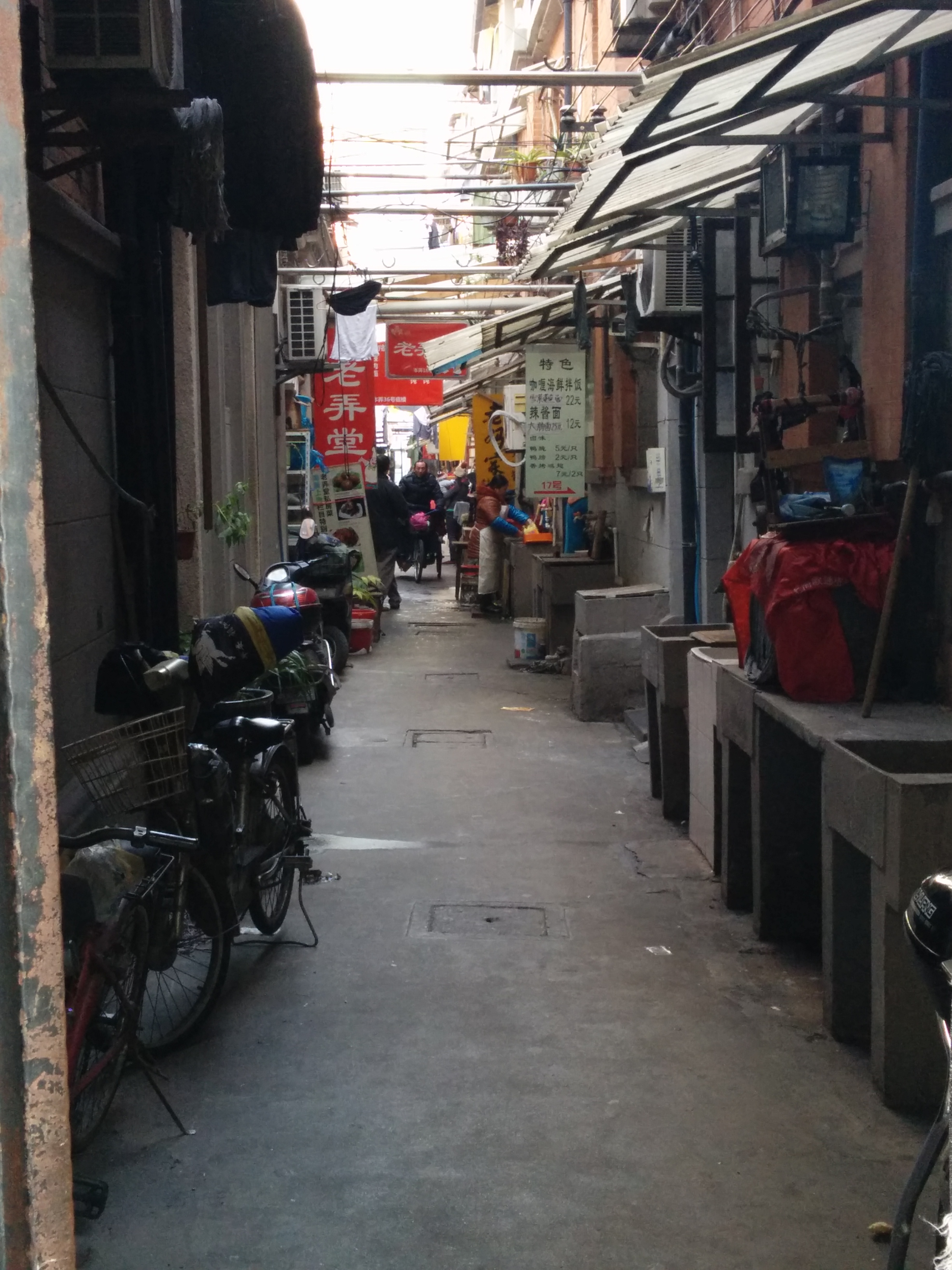
An unreconstructed laneway in Shangxian Fang, with numerous shops

Few old type shikumen neighbourhoods survive. Xingren Li, built in 1872, was regarded as a characteristic old type shikumen development. It was located on East Beijing Road, and composed of 24 two-storey residences, which varied in size between three-bay wide and five-bay wide styles. The main lane was 107.5 metres long, and the end walls featured Guanyin dou-style gables. It was demolished in 1980.

Another notable now-demolished development was Siwen Li, located on Xinzha Road. This late period old type shikumen development occupied 4.66 hectares, with 48,000 square metres of floor space. There were a total of 706 residences of two or three storeys. Most of these buildings were one-bay wide, without modern sanitary equipment. The house gates were noted for intricate baroque style lintels. Originally a middle-class neighbourhood, the area became dense slums due to the influx of refugees in the Second Sino-Japanese War. The entire neighbourhood was razed progressively in 2012–2014.

Cité Bourgogne (Bugao Li), located on South Shanxi Road, is a typical old type shikumen development despite being built in the 1930s. The neighbourhood includes 87 two-storey brick veneer residences with a red brick exterior. The trunk lane is about 2.5 wide, and there are numerous branch lanes. The lanes are noted for their main gateways, modeled after traditional Chinese pailou gates. Cité Bourgogne is well preserved in situ as a municipal heritage site, and remains mostly residential.

The largest shikumen neighbourhood which survives in a mostly original state is Jianye Li (建业里), also heritage protected. A new type development located on West Jianguo Road and Yueyang Road, the development is composed of 260 residences, all of which are two storey red brick buildings. This development is noted for its use of traditionally Chinese matou gables, and arched doorways. In 2003, the original residents were relocated, and the buildings were somewhat controversially renovated to become serviced apartments and to house restaurants and other commercial uses.

Shangxian Fang (尚贤坊), located on the site of the main hall of the International Institute of China of Gilbert Reid, is another heritage protected shikumen precinct, which is now being renovated to become "shikumen hotels". Other re-developed shikumen precincts include Xintiandi, where the buildings were extensively reconstructed, and Tianzi Fang, which has been redeveloped for small businesses with an artistic bent, while largely preserving the fabric of the buildings. All of these redevelopment projects have been controversial.

Other than Cité Bourgogne, Shangxian Fang and Jianye Li, other heritage protected shikumen precincts are Siming Cun, Meilan Fang and Rongkang Li.

== Gallery ==
=== Different types of end-wall gables ===
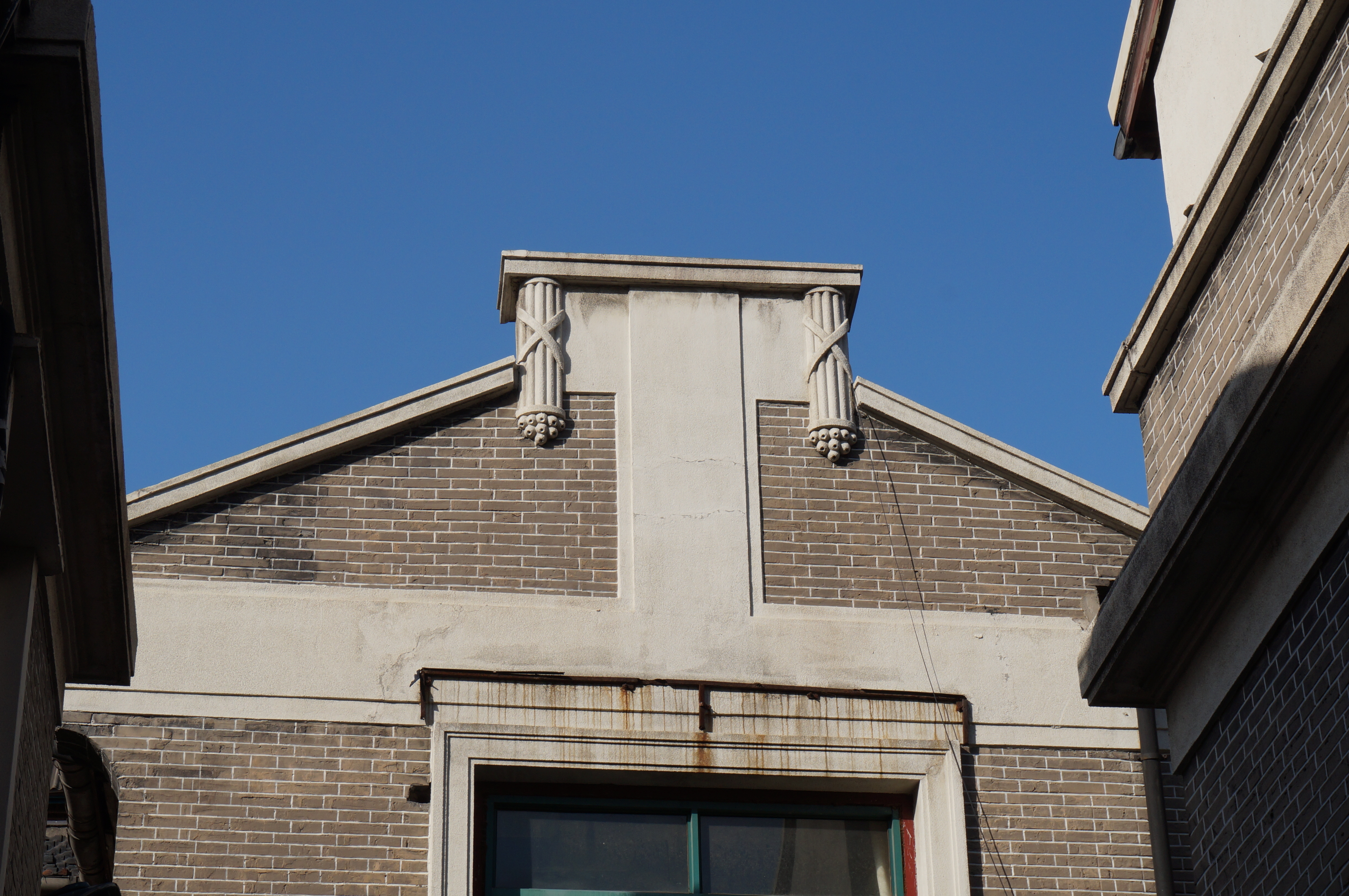
Jixiang Li

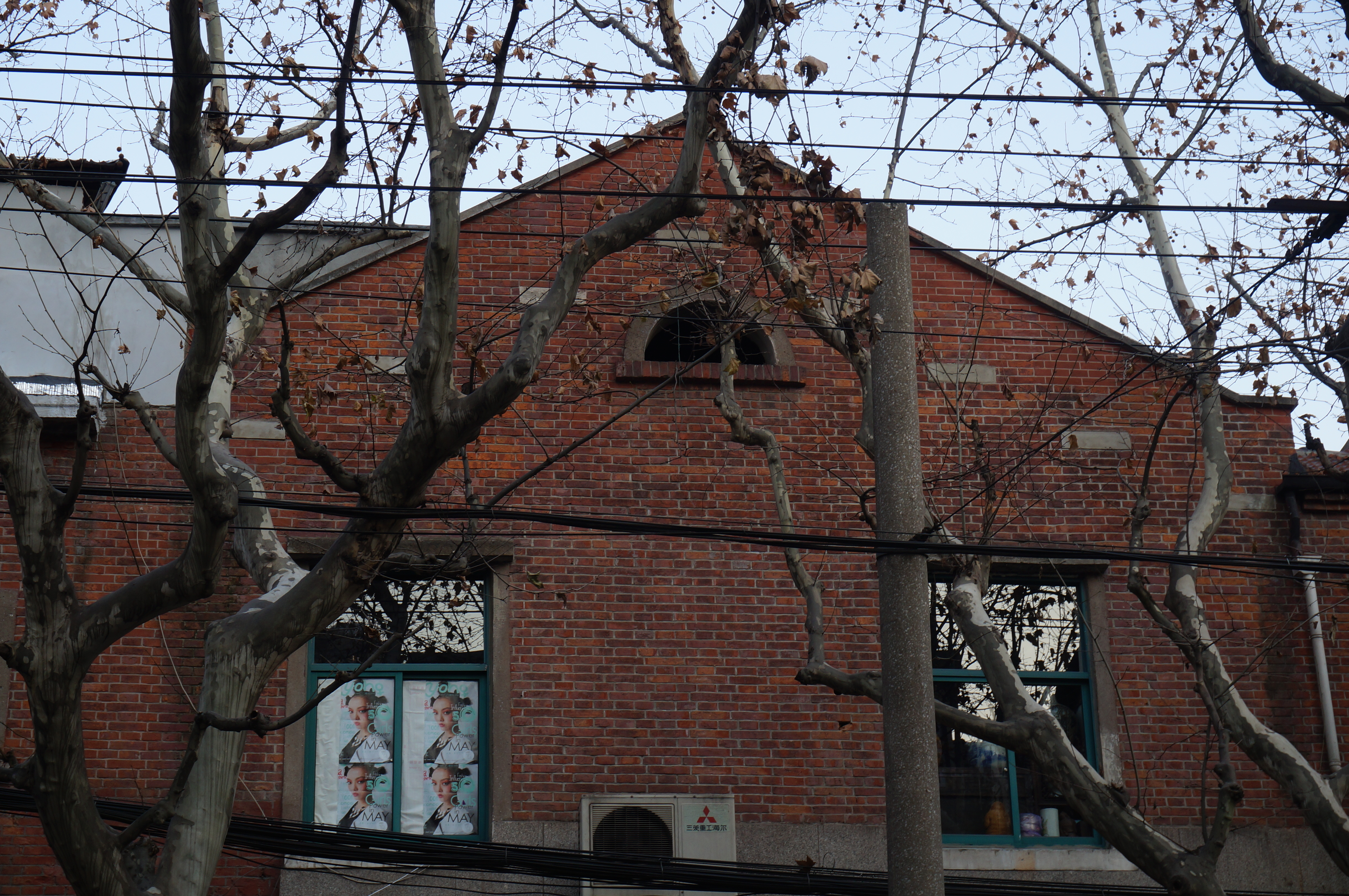
Cité Bourgogne

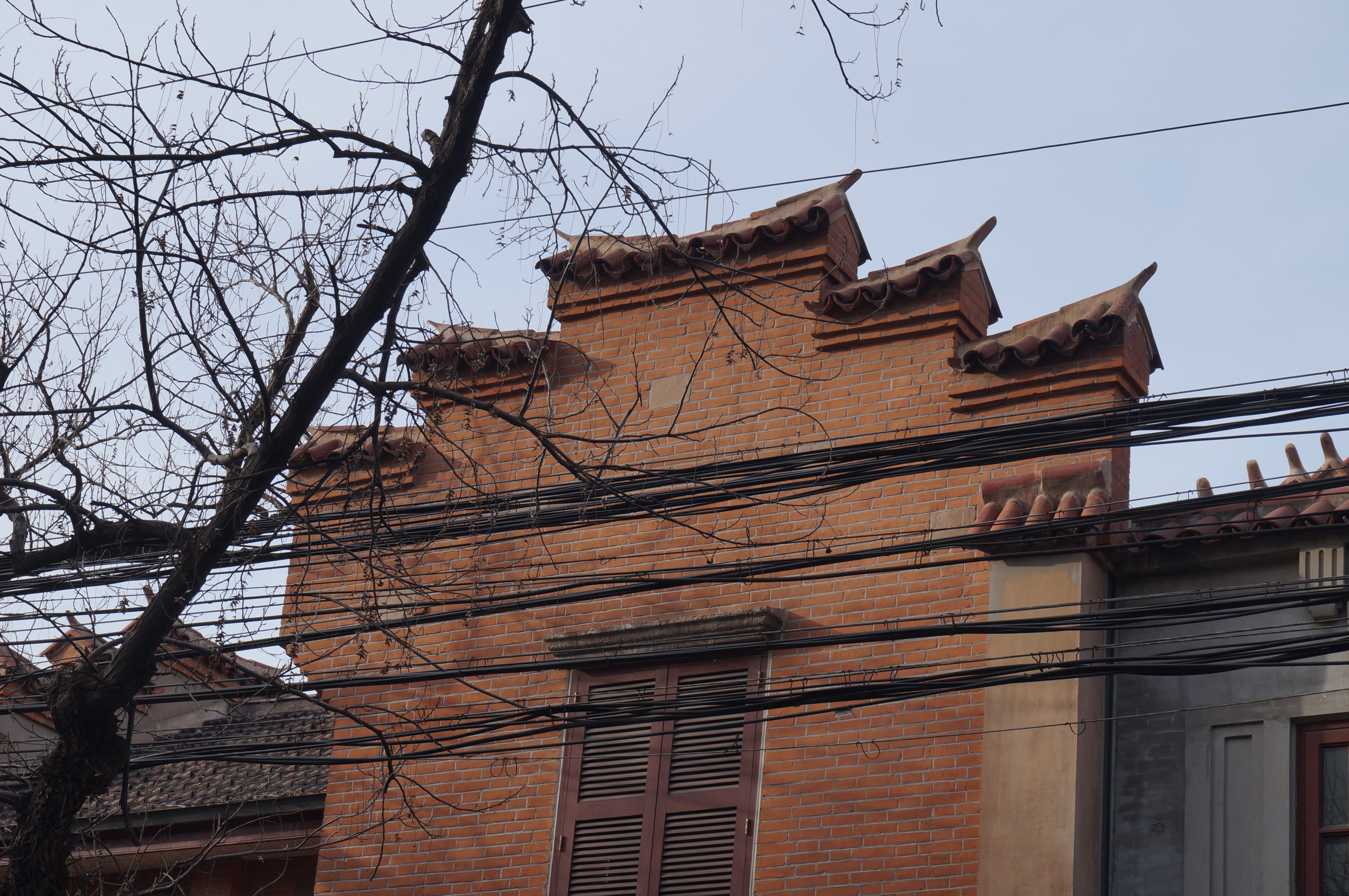
Jianye Li (matou style)

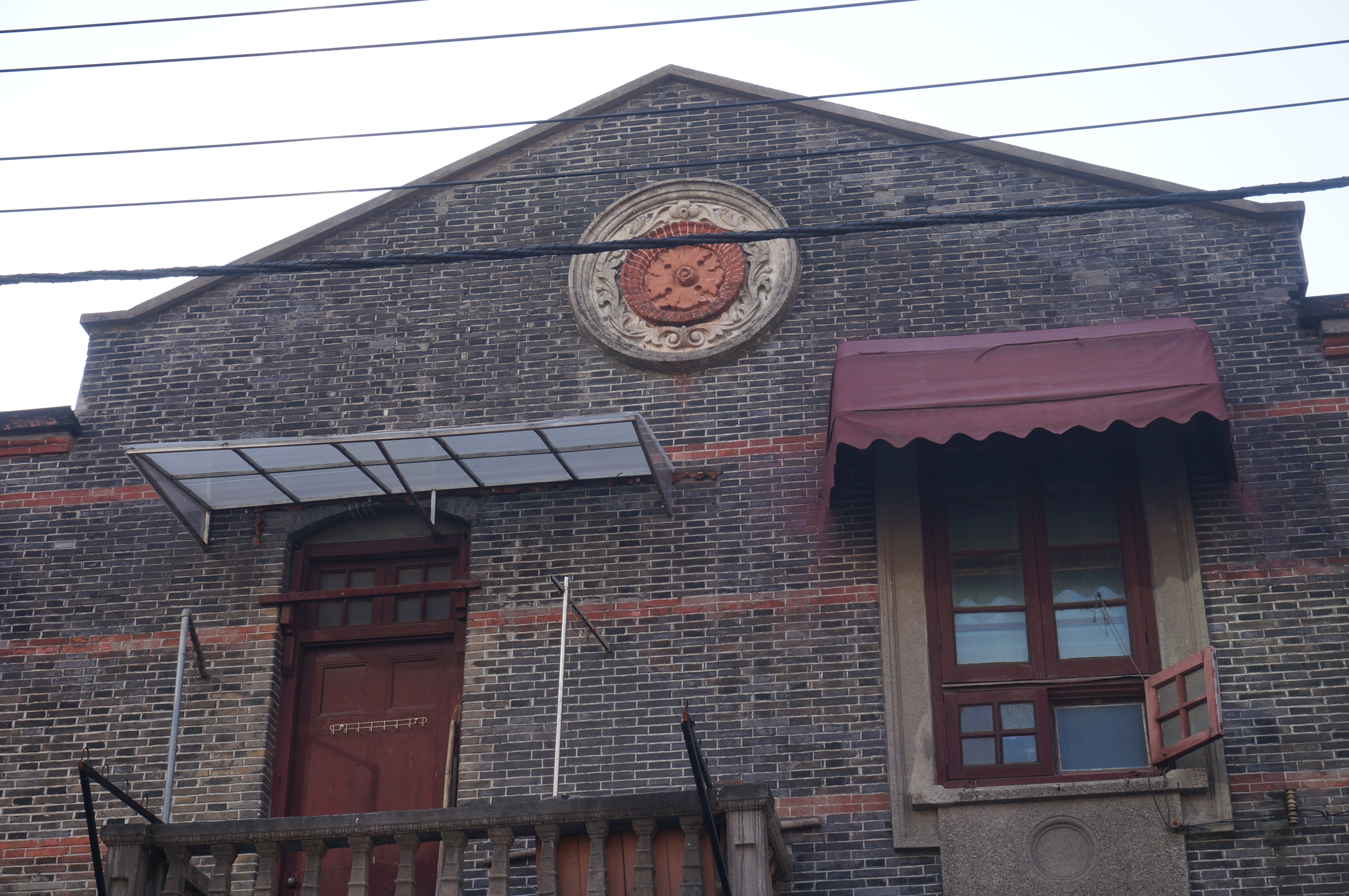
Chang Garden

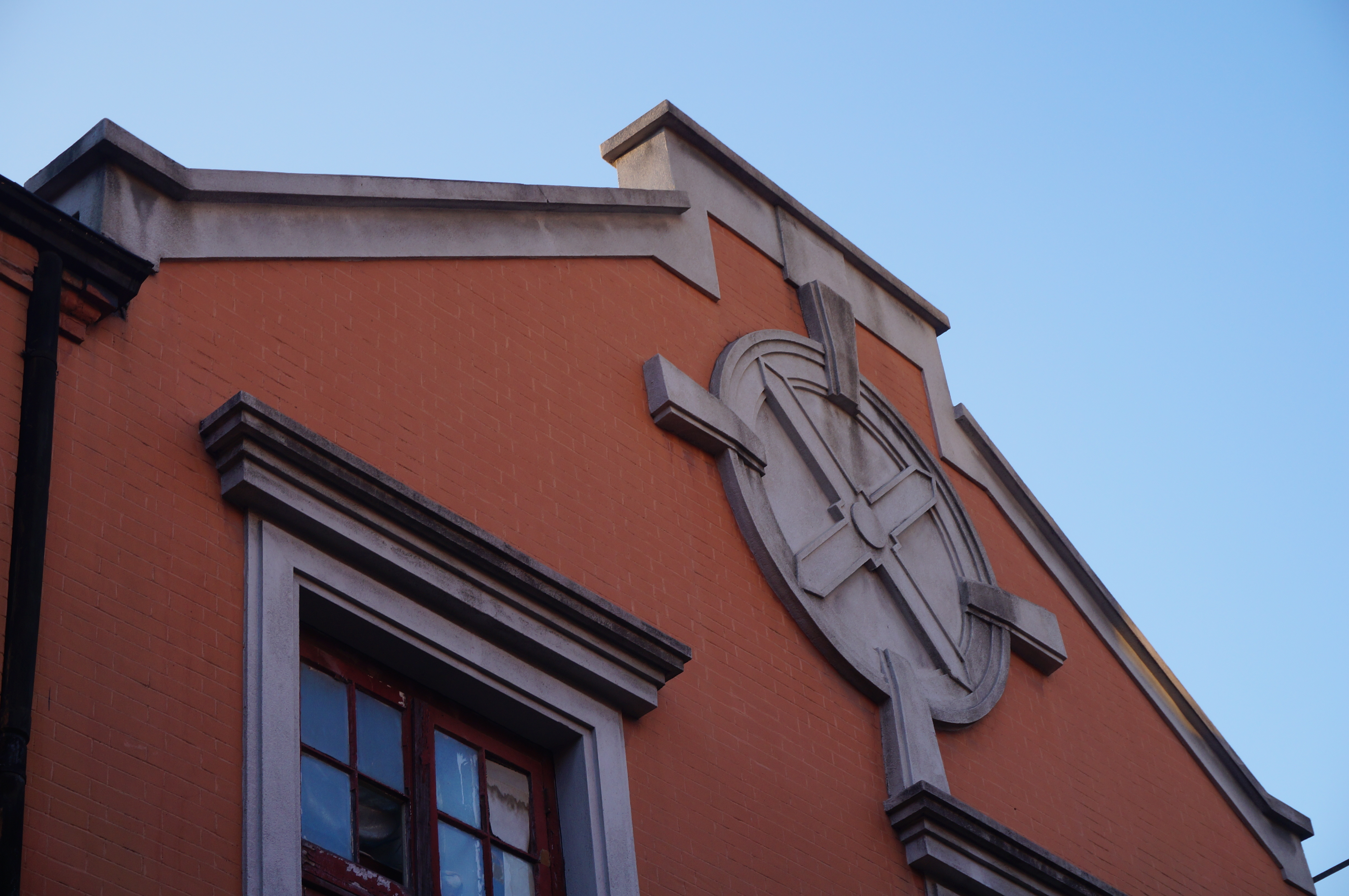
Siming Cun

=== Different types of house gates ===
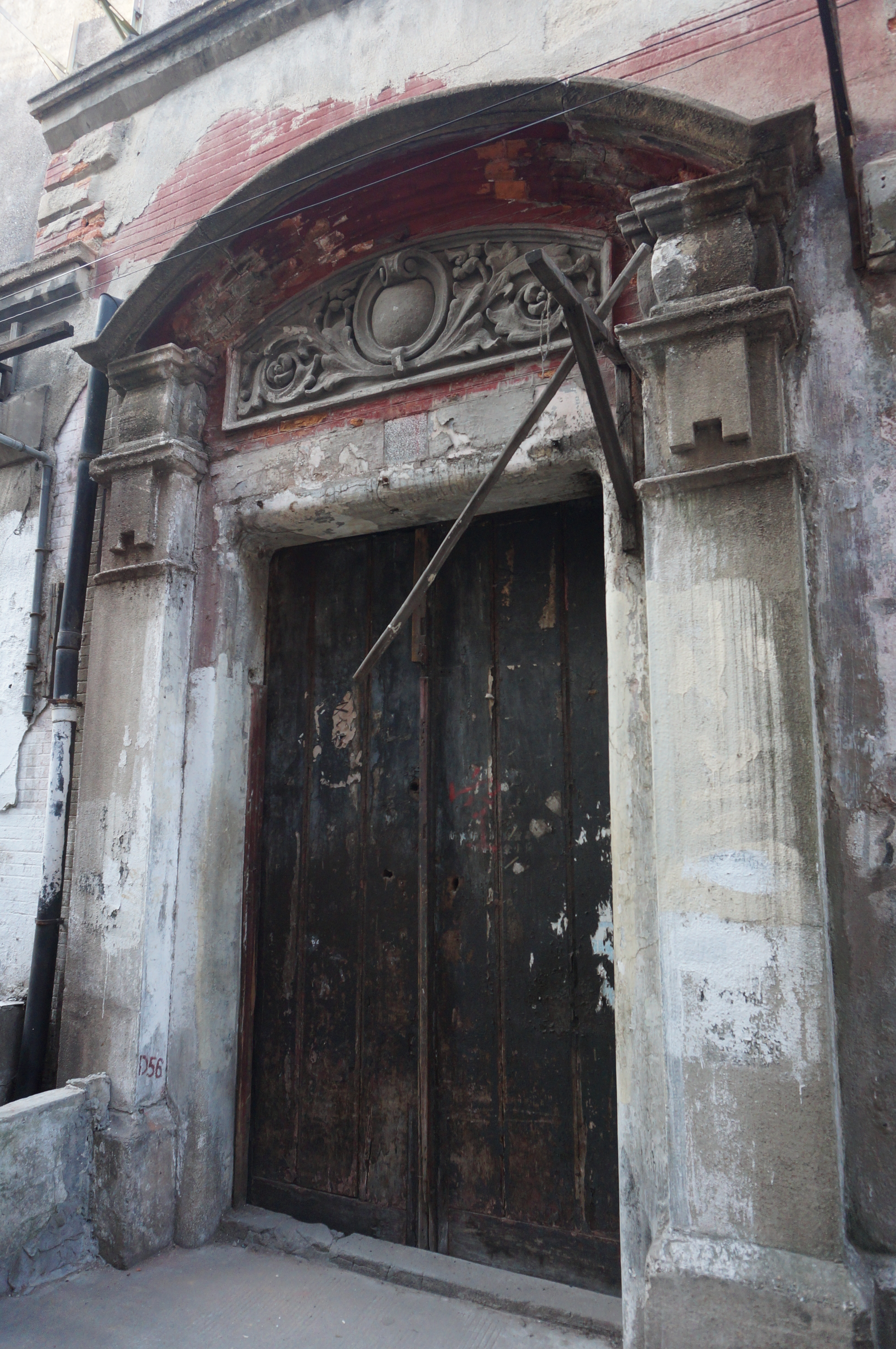
East Siwen Li (demolished)

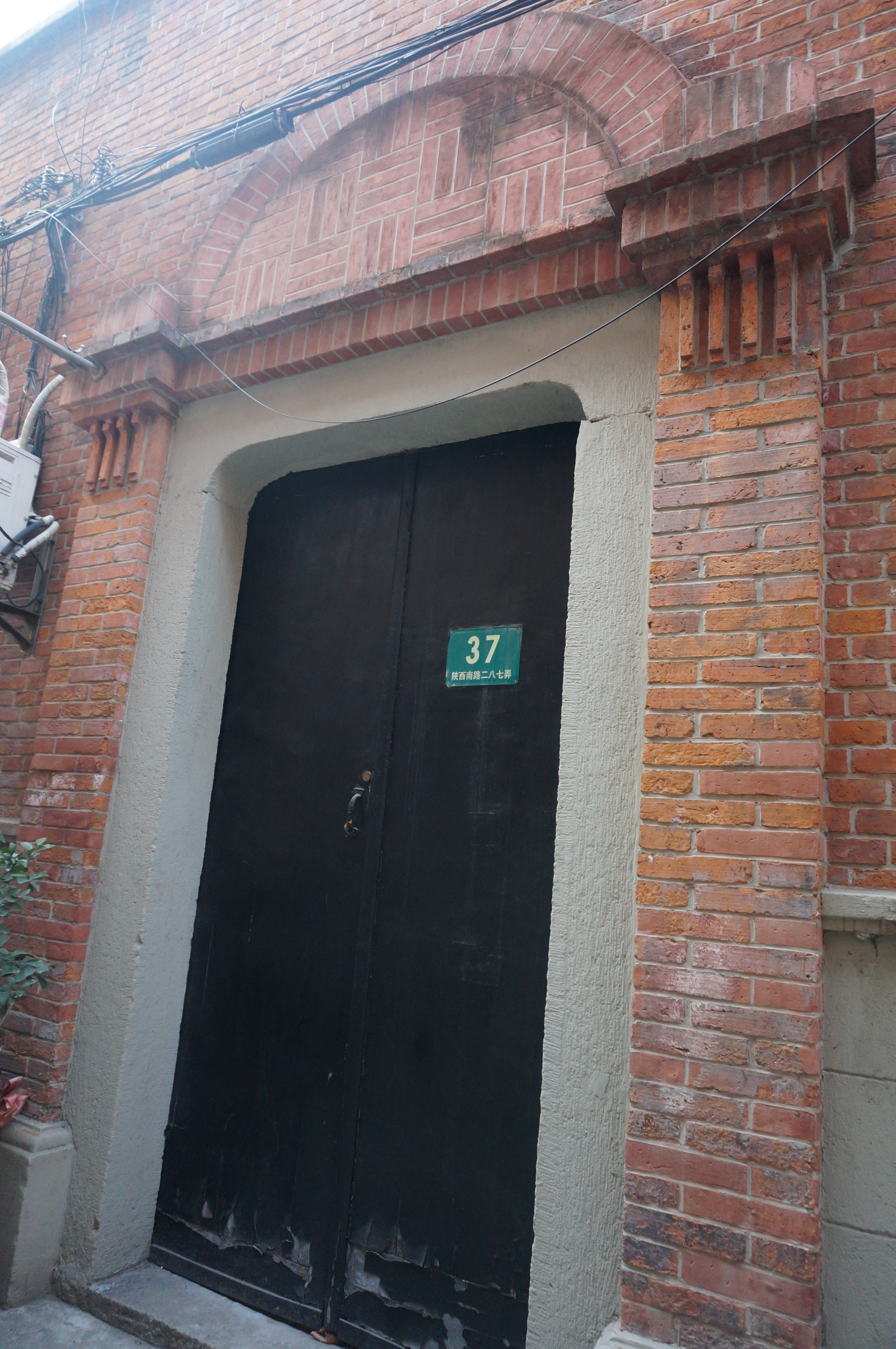
Cité Bourgogne

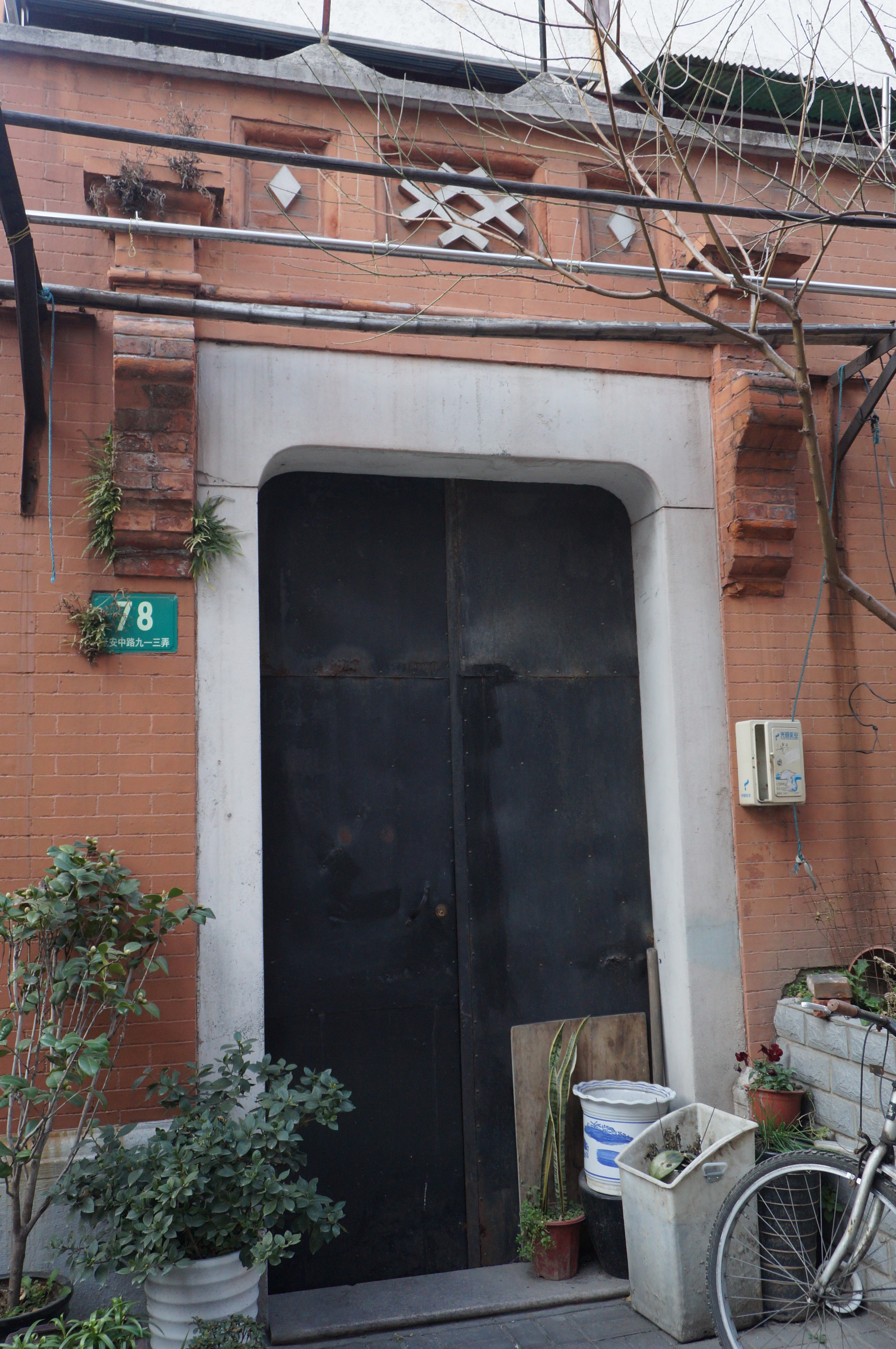
Siming Cun

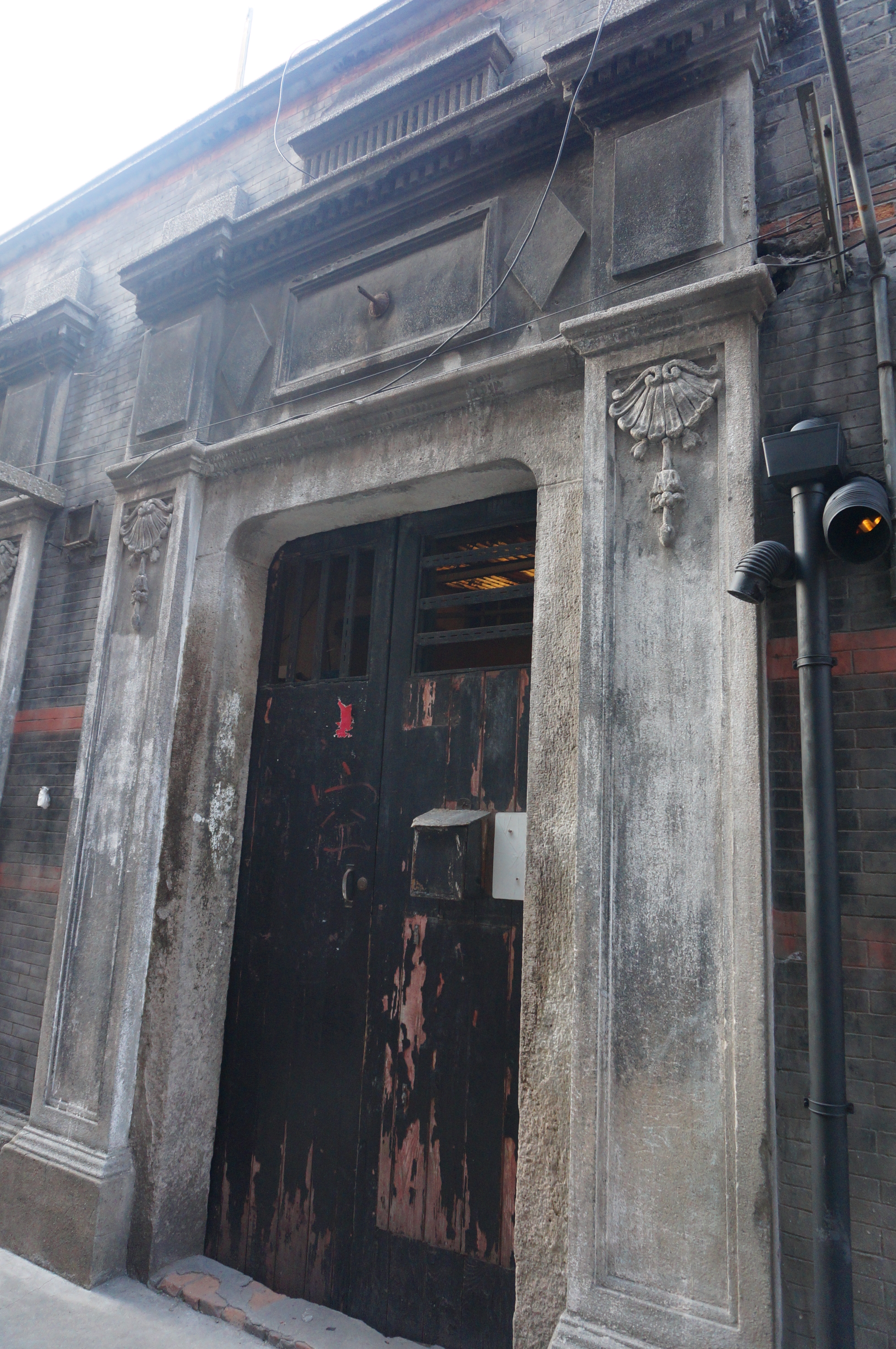
A shikumen on Xinzha Road

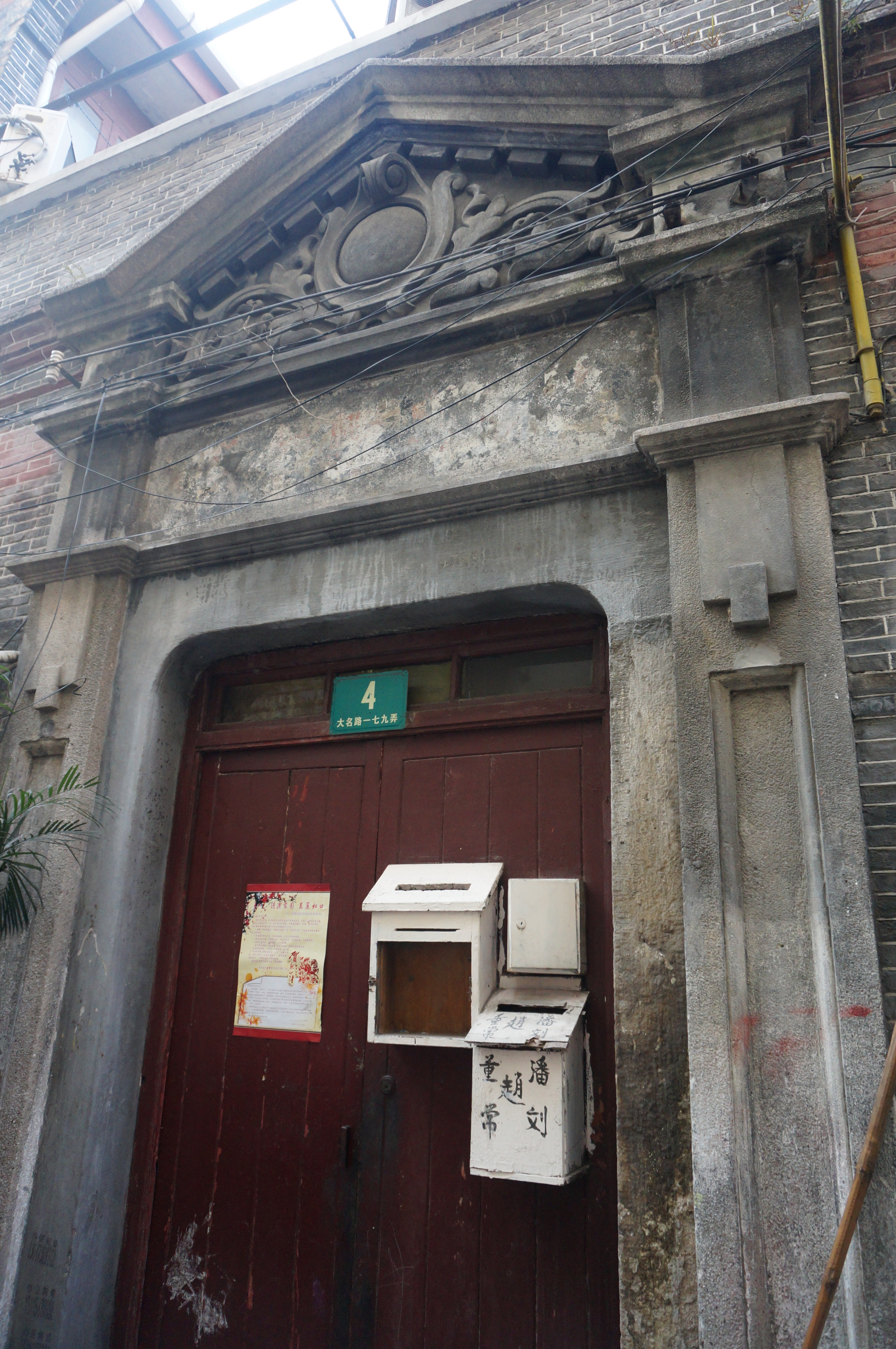
A shikumen on Daming Road

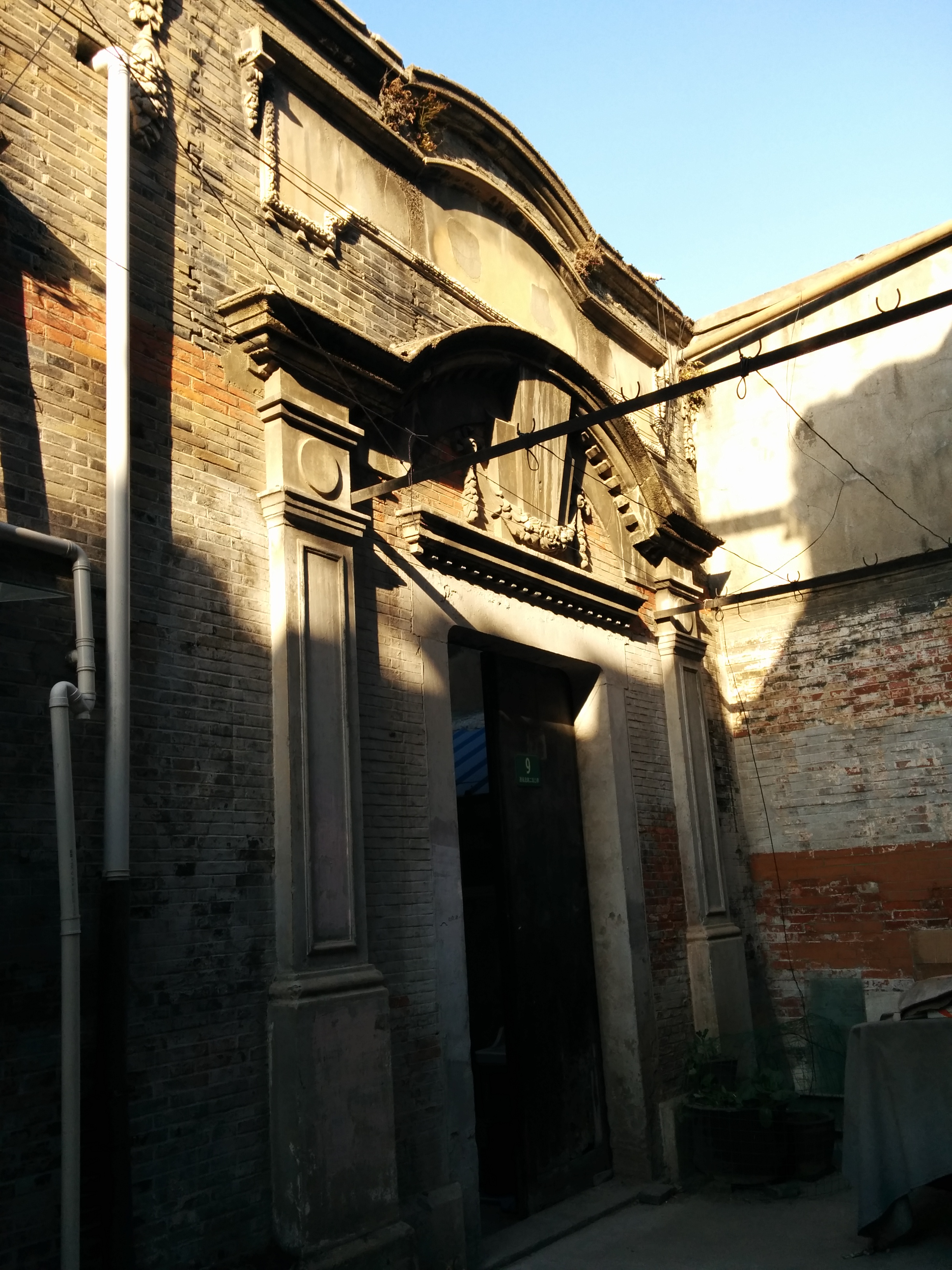
Rongkang Li

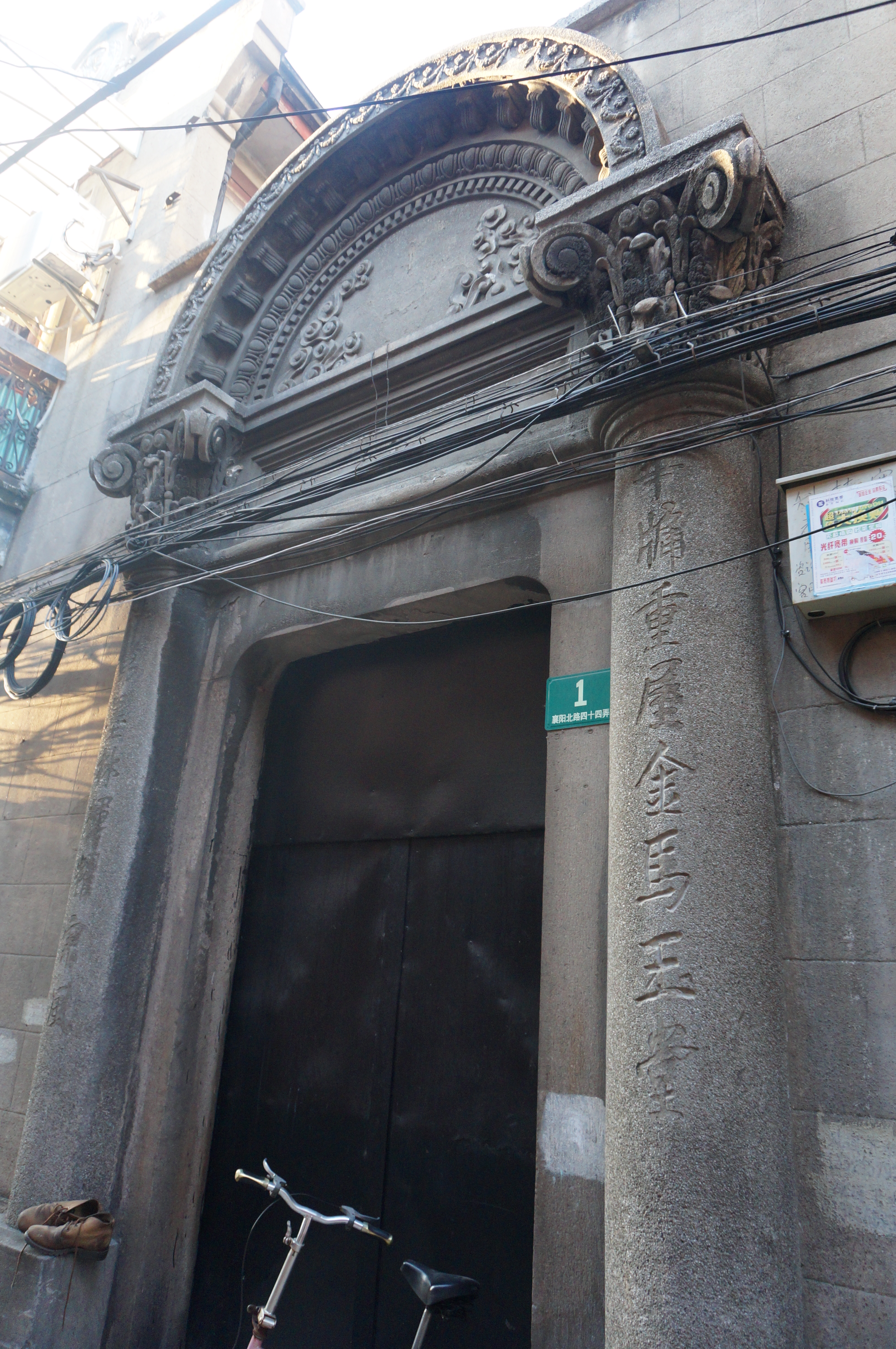
A shikumen on North Xiangyang Road

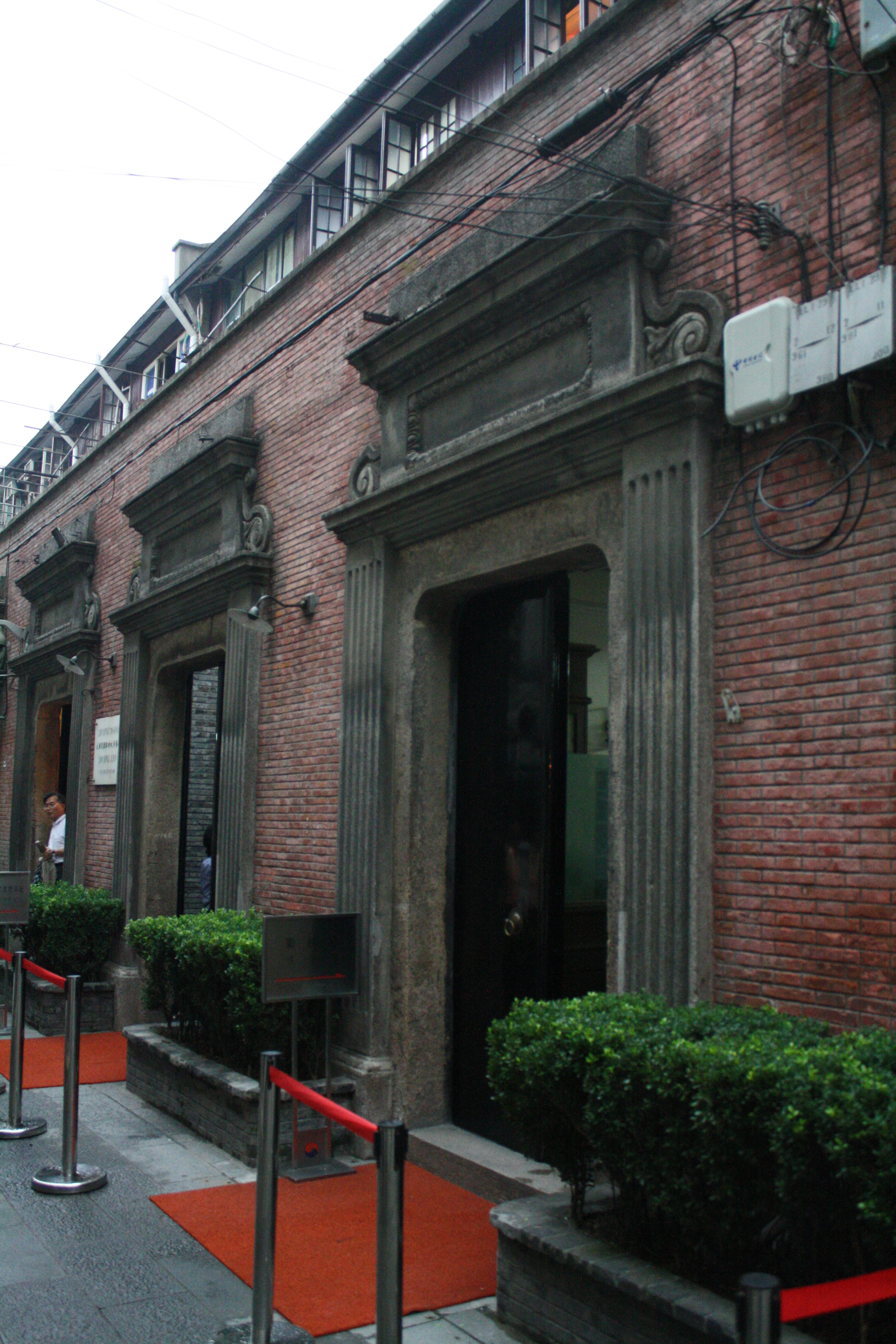
A shikumen on Madang Road

=== Different types of lane entrances ===
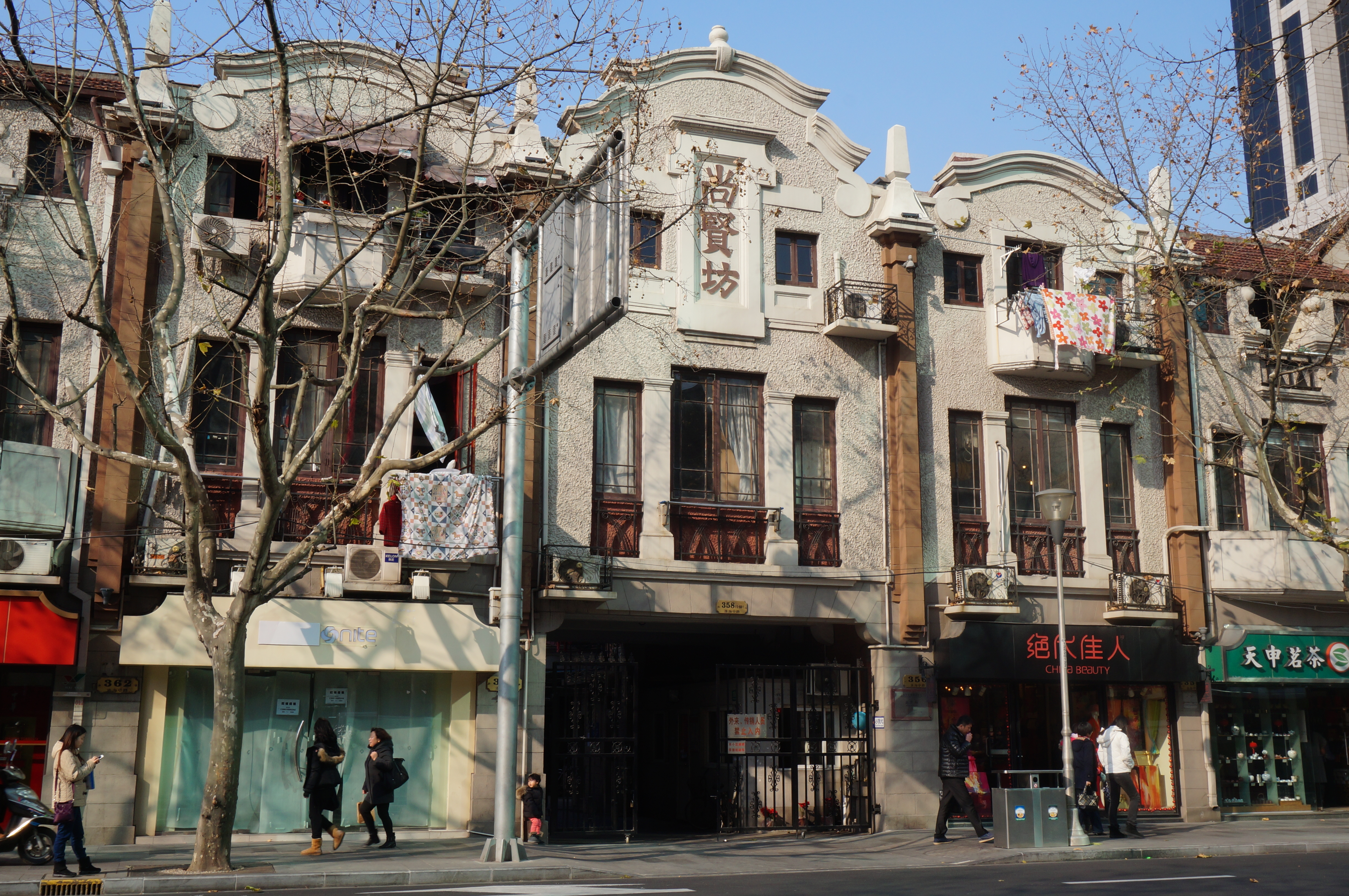
Shangxian Fang

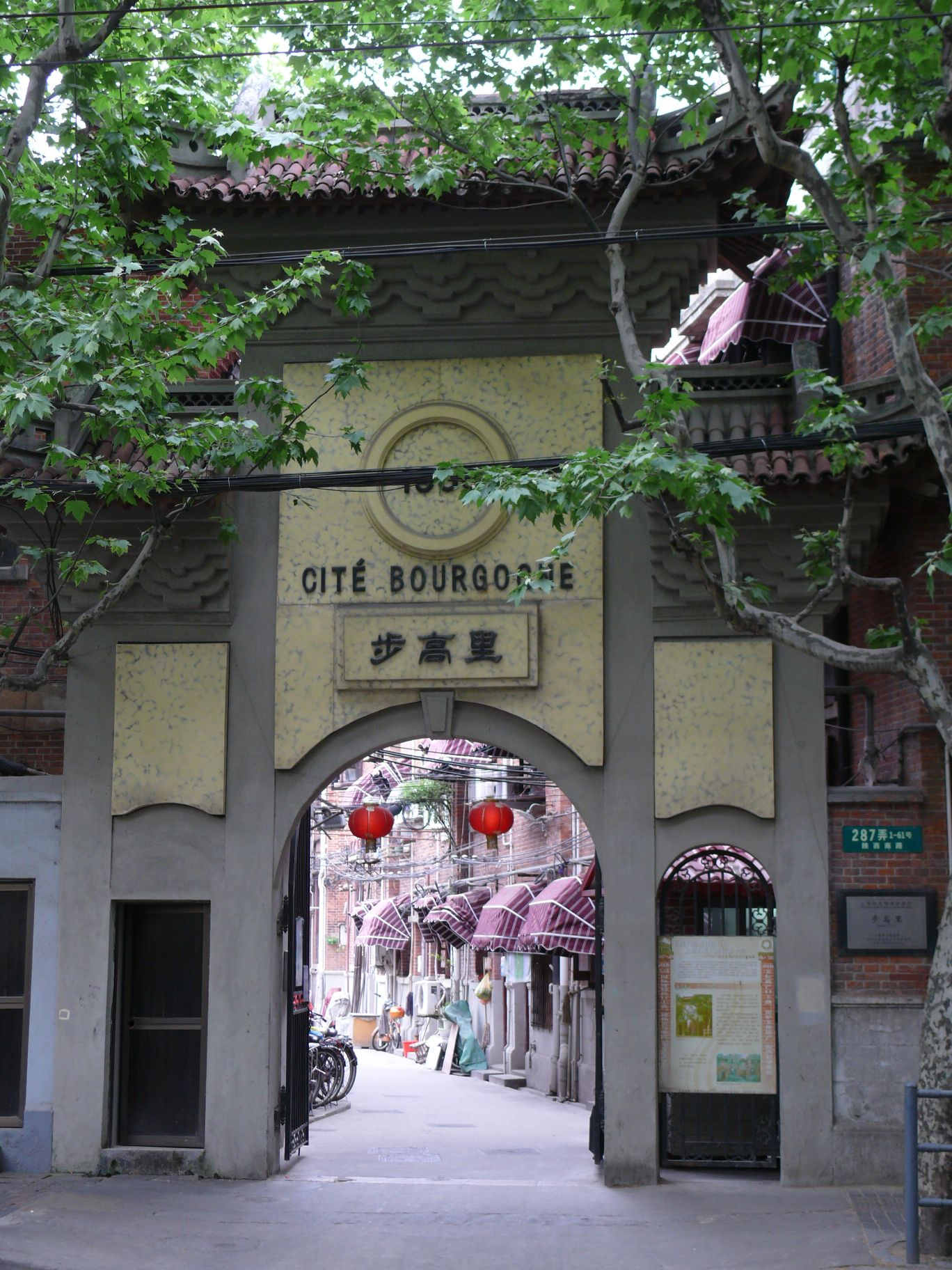
Cité Bourgogne

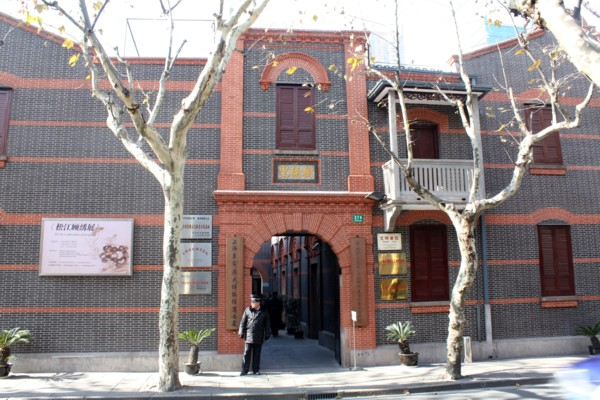
Shude Li

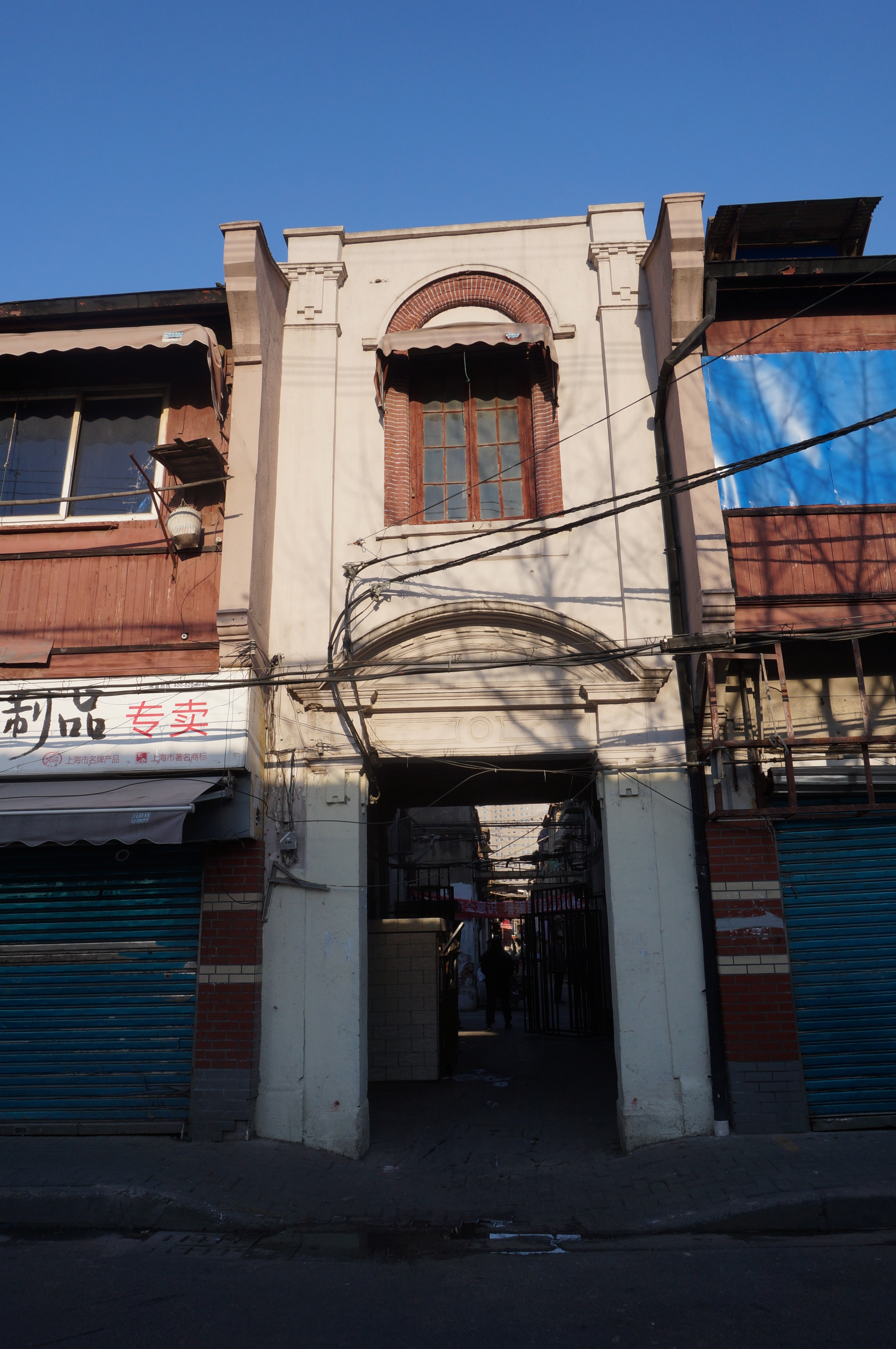
East Siwen Li (demolished)

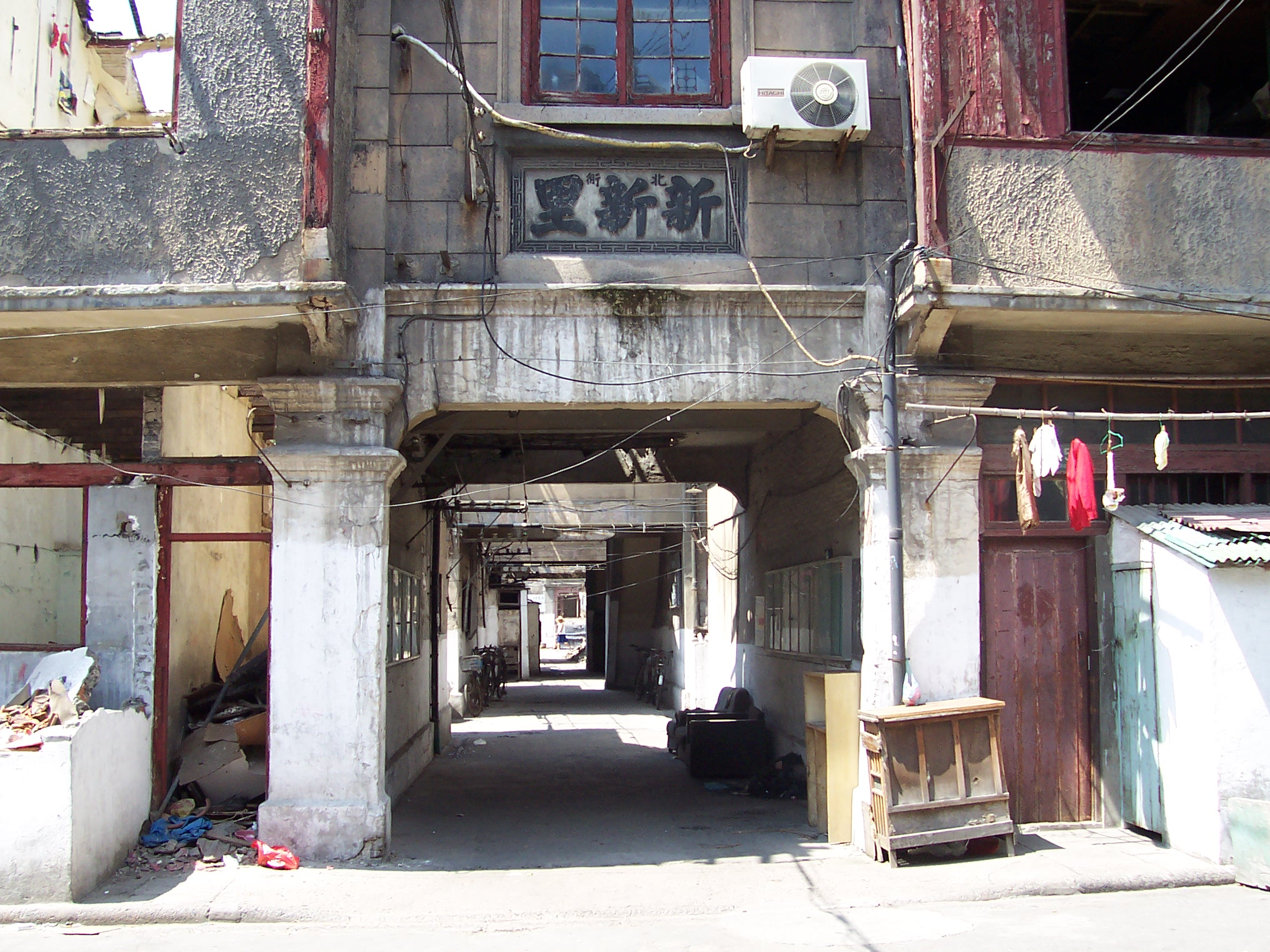
Xinxin Li

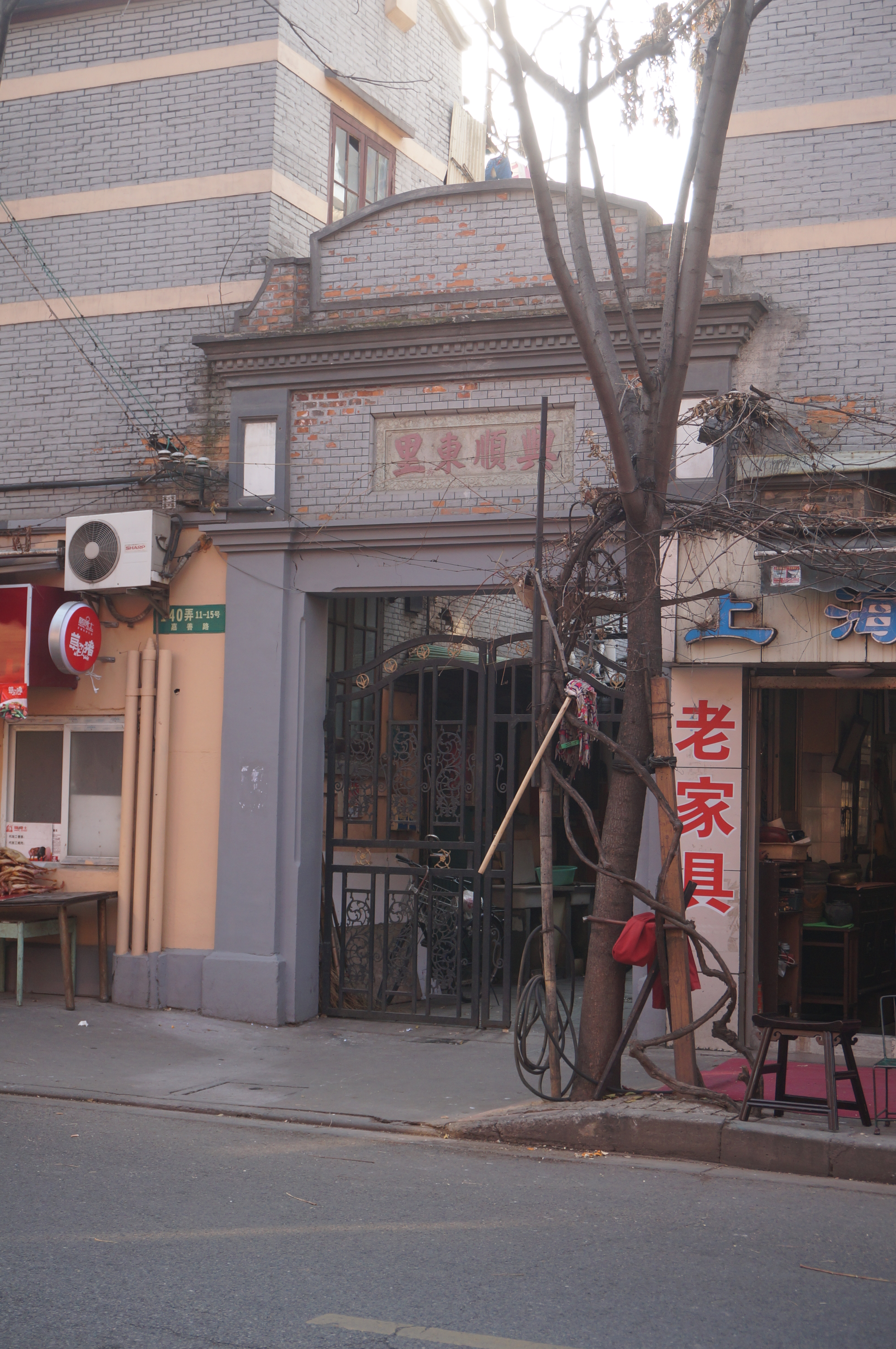
Xingshun East Li

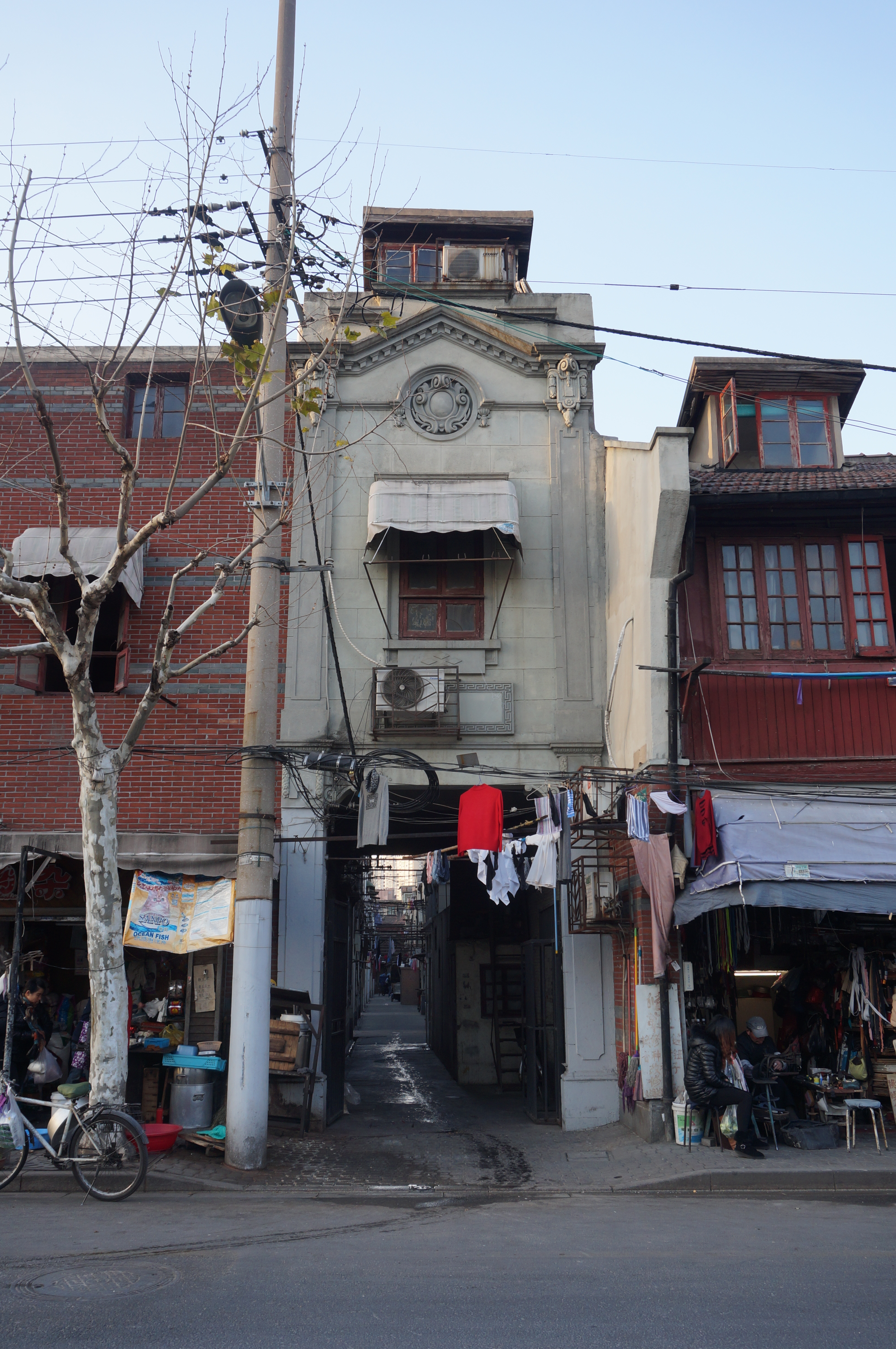
A shikumen lane on Shanhaiguan Road

== See also ==
- Shikumen Open House Museum
- Xintiandi
- Tianzifang
