= Tianzifang =

Neighbourhood in Shanghai, China

Coordinates: 31°12′36″N 121°27′53″E

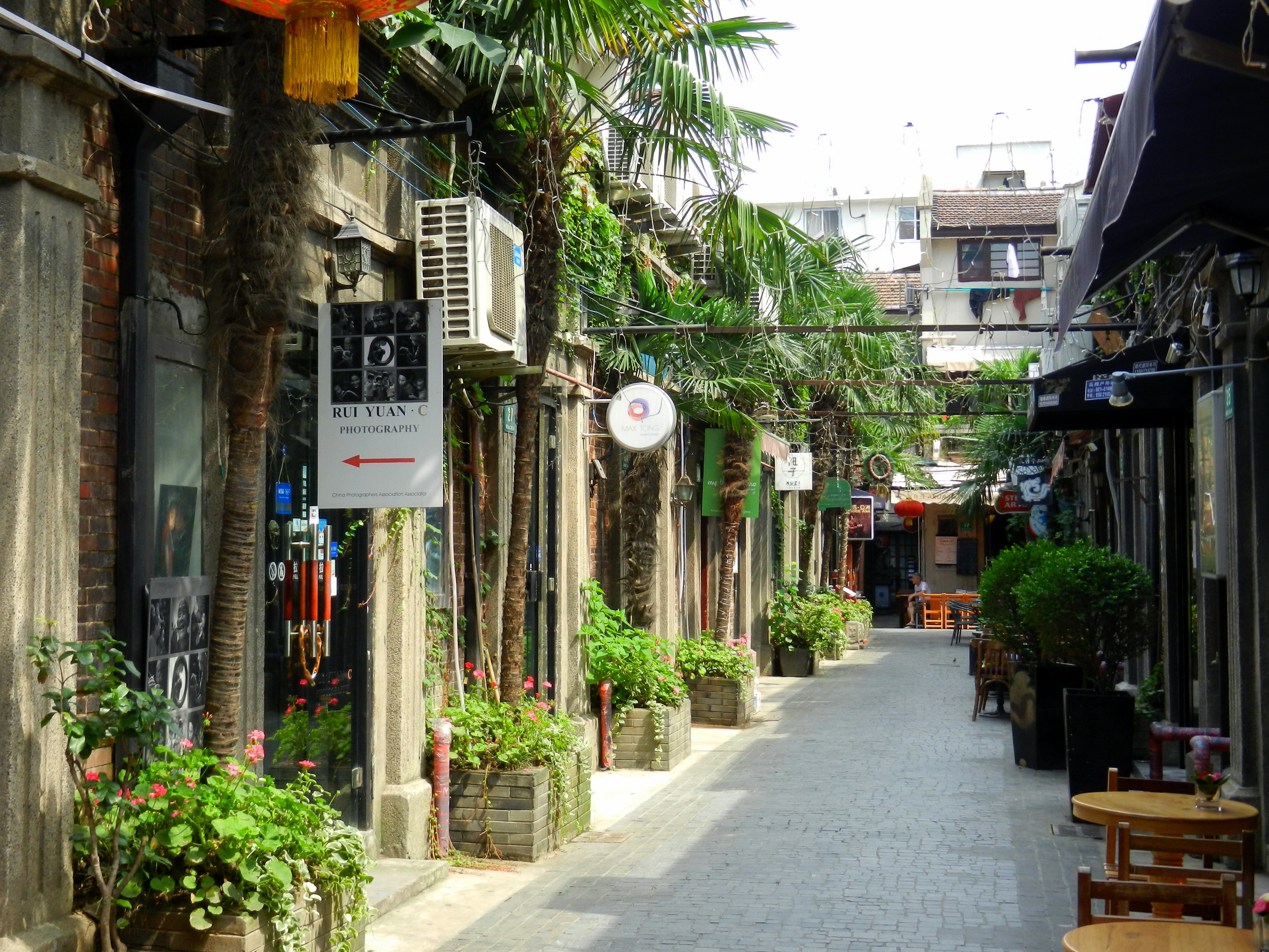
A shikumen lane in Tianzi Fang, with houses now converted into shops, studios, cafes and bars.

Map

Tianzifang or Tianzi Fang (Chinese: 田子坊; pinyin: Tiánzǐ Fǎng; Shanghainese: Die Tz Fån) is a touristic arts and crafts enclave that has developed from a renovated traditional residential area in the French Concession area of Shanghai. It is now home to boutique shops, bars and restaurants.

== Overview ==
The district comprises a neighborhood of labyrinthine alleyways off Taikang Road (Chinese: 泰康路; pinyin: Tàikāng Lù), a short street which is today mostly known only for Tianzi Fang. Tianzi Fang is known for small craft stores, coffee shops, trendy art studios and narrow alleys. It has become a popular tourist destination in Shanghai, and an example of preservation of local Shikumen architecture. It is sometimes compared to Xintiandi, though in the latter precinct most of the houses were demolished and rebuilt, rather than renovated.

Tianzi Fang is largely hidden from the neighbouring streets, as it grew from the inside of the block outward, although there are now shops on Taikang Road itself. Historically Lane #248 was a key entrance that, in order to gain access to the commercially developed area, required walking about 50m through whilst be surrounded by local residents' life, including bicycles, hanging laundry, etc. until finally emerging in the 'new' area.

== History ==
"Tianzifang" is actually the name given to this old alley by the painter Huang Yongyu a few years ago. According to historical records, "Tian Zifang" is an ancient Chinese painter. The former small factories on the streets, the abandoned warehouses in the alleys, and the ordinary houses in Shikumen Lane are painted with the color of "Soho" and more artistic.

The neighborhood centres on a block of Shikumen residential development dating from 1933. The shikumen complex was named "Zhicheng Fang", where "Zhicheng" meant "realisation of ambition" while "Fang" meant "neighbourhood" and was a common suffix for shikumen estates. Today's Tianzi Fang precinct covers not only the former Zhicheng Fang, but also other adjoining houses, apartments and industrial buildings of various styles.

Located near the eastern end of the Zhaojiabang canal and the southern edge of the Shanghai French Concession, it was in the relatively downmarket part of the Concession. In 1954, the canal was filled in and the former canal basin became a busy transport interchange. Zhicheng Fang remained an ordinary residential neighbourhood until the last quarter of the 20th century, when the cheap rent but convenient location attracted artists to set up studios there. In 1998, the formerly busy wet market on Taikang Road was moved indoors. In 2001, the precinct was redesignated an artistic and creative quarter, drawing on its former popularity with artists. At the same time, the whole precinct was given the name "Tianzi Fang", a pun on Tian Zifang, a figure from the Warring States period and often referred to as China's earliest recorded artist. In 2006 it was slated for demolition to make way for redevelopment. Opposition among local business owners and residents, as well as artist Chen Yifei who had a studio in Tianzifang, in addition to a group submitted a proposal to the local government to preserve the Taikang Road area and its traditional architecture and ambience.

Rezoning of Tianzi Fang into a tourist precinct began in 2005/2006 with nearby art schools and studios, and later small international business owners found out about Tianzi Fang through the local grapevine. Its development began very slowly with local merchants, a New Zealand store, Japanese restaurants, and a tea house setting up in the district. From the beginning of 2007, journalists, visitors and local residents began to visit the area and spread the word about a cosy little lane district that housed some interesting and creative businesses. Additional articles in both local and foreign media such as the New York Times helped increase awareness of this older and unusual community, that stood out among the more modern and commercial shopping areas of Shanghai.

== Today ==
Tianzi fang is located in one of the most expensive areas in Shanghai. It has become a major tourist attraction and has more than 200 diverse small businesses such as cafes, bars, restaurants, art galleries, craft stores, design houses and studios, and even French bistros. It is adjacent to the SML center which is among the largest shopping malls in Shanghai upon completion. It is also near the Shanghai Metro Line 9's Dapuqiao Station which is immediately to the south.

Despite all the businesses selling trendy craft and some foreign goods, the area does not have the look of having been overly beautified - electricity cables are still strung overhead, and air conditioning units are obvious on the outside of the buildings. The district is distinctly different from Xintiandi, another Shikumen redevelopment in central Shanghai further to the northeast, in that it has managed to preserve its residential feel, adding to its appeal.

== See also ==
- Shikumen
- Xintiandi
- 50 Moganshan Road
- 798 Art Zone
