= Shikumen Open House Museum =

Museum in Shanghai, China

Coordinates: 31.221°N 121.474°E

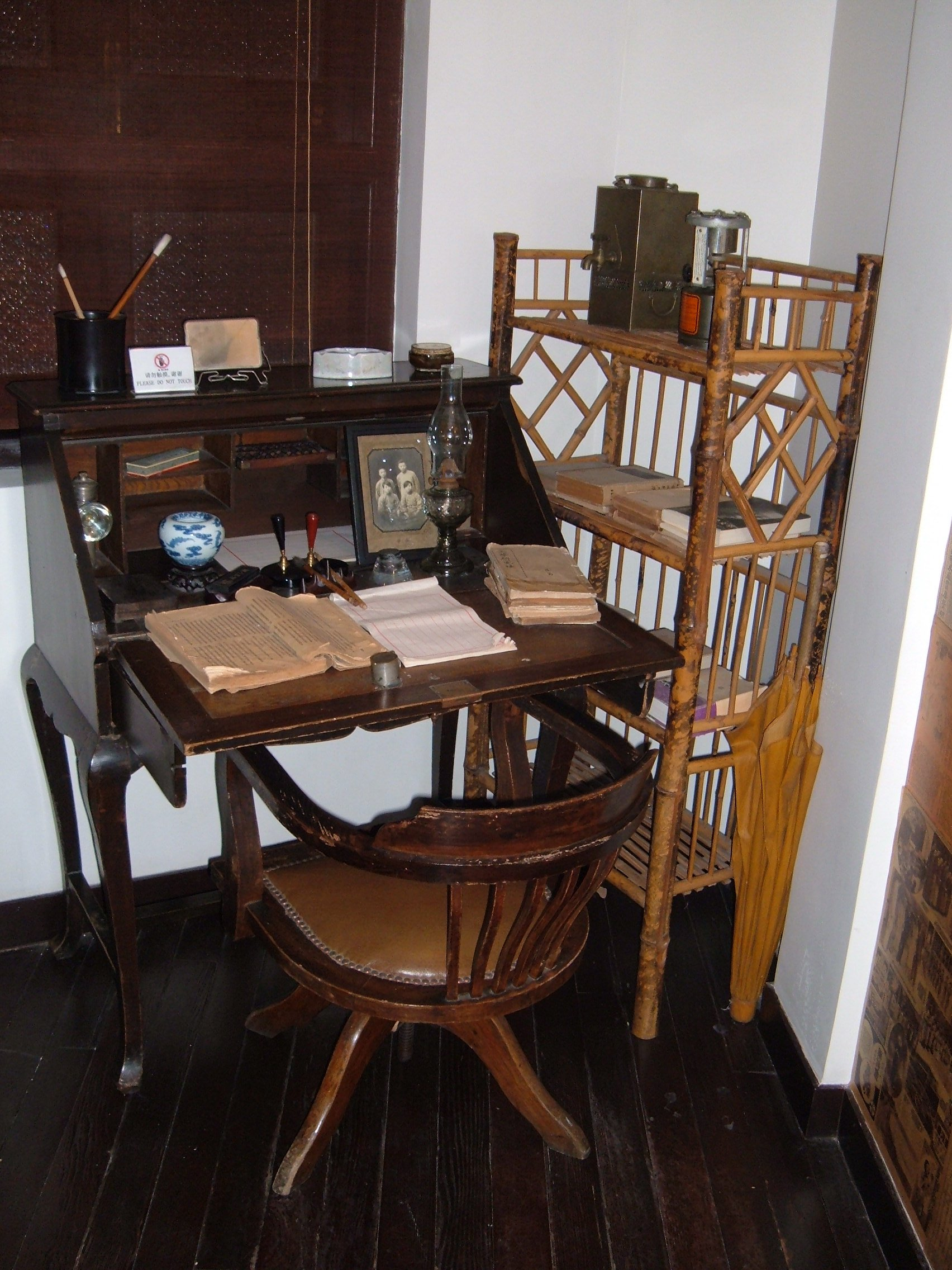
Writer's desk in the tingzijian room within the Shikumen Open House Museum.

The Shikumen Open House Museum (Chinese: 屋里厢-石库门博物馆; pinyin: Wūlixiāng-Shíkùmén Bówùguǎn; Shanghainese: Olishian-Sakumen Bovahgue) is a museum in the Xintiandi area of Shanghai, China (administratively in the Huangpu District) that presents a house in the traditional shikumen style.

This is a small museum on the south side of the North Block of Xintiandi on Xingye Road that presents Shanghai life as it was around the 1920s and 30s in a shikumen-style "stone-gate" house. There are about five rooms furnished with period furniture. The museum includes a tingzijian, a small triangular room, sometimes rented out at a low price to impoverished writers and others.

== Transport ==
The nearest Shanghai Metro stations are South Huangpi Road Station on Line 1 to the north and Xintiandi on Line 10 to the south.

== See also ==
- Museum of the First National Congress of the Chinese Communist Party in the same road
