= Bloody Saturday (Shanghai) =

Misdirected attack on civilians during the Second Sino-Japanese War

- Part of Battle of Shanghai of the Second Sino-Japanese War
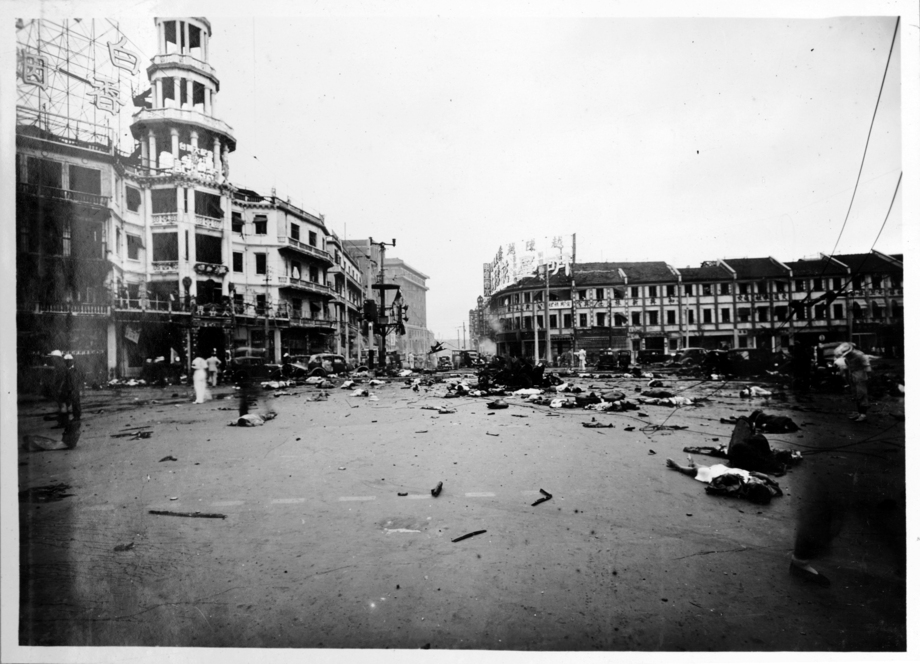
- Great World amusement centre after bombing
- Native name: 大世界坠弹惨案; 黑色星期六
- Location: 31.230628°N 121.473848°E; The intersection of Avenue Edward VII, Yu Ya Ching Road and Boulevard de Montigny, near the Great World amusement centre, Shanghai International Settlement
- Date: August 14, 1937
- Target: Japanese cruiser Izumo
- Attack type: Tactical bombing (collateral damage)
- Weapon: Aerial bomb
- Deaths: 1,200
- Injuries: 1,400
- Perpetrator: National Revolutionary Army: Air Force

Bloody Saturday, also known as Black Saturday and the Great World bombing, was a misdirected attack on civilians by the Air Force of the National Revolutionary Army on 14 August 1937 during the Battle of Shanghai of the Second Sino-Japanese War. On the day, the Air Force, in an unsuccessful attempt to attack the Japanese cruiser Izumo moored next to the Japanese Consulate in Shanghai, accidentally bombed the city centre, resulting in the deaths of some thousand civilians.

== Background ==
=== Weather conditions ===
In August 1937, an unexpected typhoon swept coastal China, which prevented commercial shipping from accessing the city. The typhoon also damaged Shanghai's telephone system, hindering communication, and led to the suspension of flights between Shanghai and Guangzhou. Despite these disruptions, the recovery was quick, and normalcy returned soon after the typhoon passed.

=== Ongoing battles ===
Japan launches its full-scale invasion of China in July. By mid-July, China had lost Peiping and Tianjin. On 13 August, the Japanese gunboats began attacking the Chinese-administered northern Shanghai, especially near the University of Shanghai. In response to the situation in Shanghai, Chiang Kai-shek redirected the focus of the Chinese Air Force from North China to the Shanghai region. By 14 August, the 2nd Bomb Group, 4th Pursuit Group, and 5th Pursuit Group were ordered to relocate to bases in Jining, Qianqiu, and Yangzhou. The Central Aviation School near Hangzhou was also instructed to form new provisional squadrons. Rather than adopting a defensive strategy, the Chinese command directed all air units stationed in Eastern China to launch attacks on Japanese positions in Shanghai.

=== Refugee crisis ===
The outbreak of war on 13 August led to a significant refugee crisis in Shanghai's International Settlement and the French Concession, as residents from Zhabei, Hongkou, and Yangshupu sought safety. Between 26 July and 5 August 1937, over 50,000 civilians fled Zhabei, walking through the Garden Bridge over the Suzhou Creek to reach the foreign settlements. Local organisations and institutions, including the notable Great World entertainment complex, began to provide shelter and food for the influx of refugees.

== Air combats ==
On 13 August, upon witnessing the arrival of the Japanese Third Fleet, Claire Lee Chennault, who had been commissioned by Madame Chiang, returned to Nanjing and recommended that Chinese bombers be deployed to attack the Japanese cruiser Idzumo. Since no Chinese officers had prior experience with such an operation, Chennault took command of the mission.

On 14 August, around 40 aircraft arrived over Shanghai, which was blanketed in thick clouds. The first strike happened in the morning when 21 Northrop Gamma bombers targeted Japanese ships at Wusong. A second wave followed with eight Curtiss Hawk III biplanes from the 5th Pursuit Group, each carrying 500-pound bombs, taking off from Yangzhou to attack Japanese ships near Nantong along the Yangtze.

== Misdirected attacks ==
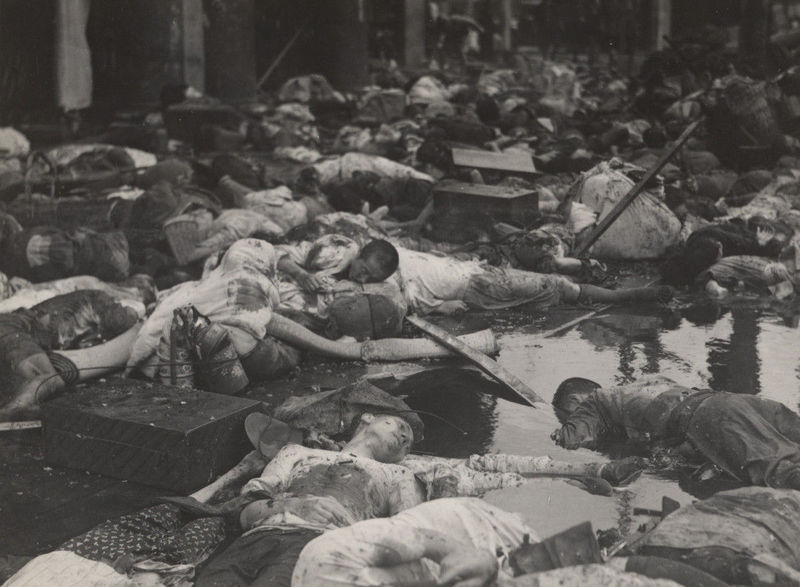
Civilian victims of the August 14 bombing near the Great World

The Chinese planes aimed to strike the Japanese cruiser Izumo, but due to limited visibility and lack of experience, the bombs missed, falling into the Huangpu River instead. This caused large waves and sent shrapnel over the gathered spectators, creating panic. Despite the danger, many onlookers, including refugees who had fled from the northern districts, stayed in the area without realising the risks.

At 4:27 pm, another group of Chinese aircraft appeared, prompting the Izumo to respond with anti-aircraft fire that filled the sky with smoke. Six planes managed to escape, but four others dropped bombs. Some bombs landed in the river, while others hit Nanjing Road, damaging buildings like the Cathay and Palace Hotels and killing and injuring civilians. Vehicles were also set ablaze. 15 minutes later, two more bombs struck near the Great World amusement centre, where 10,000 refugees gathered. One bomb exploded in mid-air, spreading debris widely and causing significant destruction. The blasts shattered windows, damaged buildings, and resulted in immediate fatalities. These air raids left over 1,200 people dead and around 1,400 injured.

== Reactions ==
The bombing of the foreign concessions in Shanghai led to widespread panics, as it broke the relative safety of the foreign-protected land. People who wanted to leave the city crowded to the ticket office of Dollar Line offices on the Bund, but the ships refused to go up the Huangpu River for the Bund due to the bombing. The French Concession enforced a no-fly zone with anti-aircraft batteries, despite protests from both Chinese and Japanese governments.
