= Huaihai Road =

Road in Shanghai, China

Coordinates: 31°13′04″N 121°27′40″E

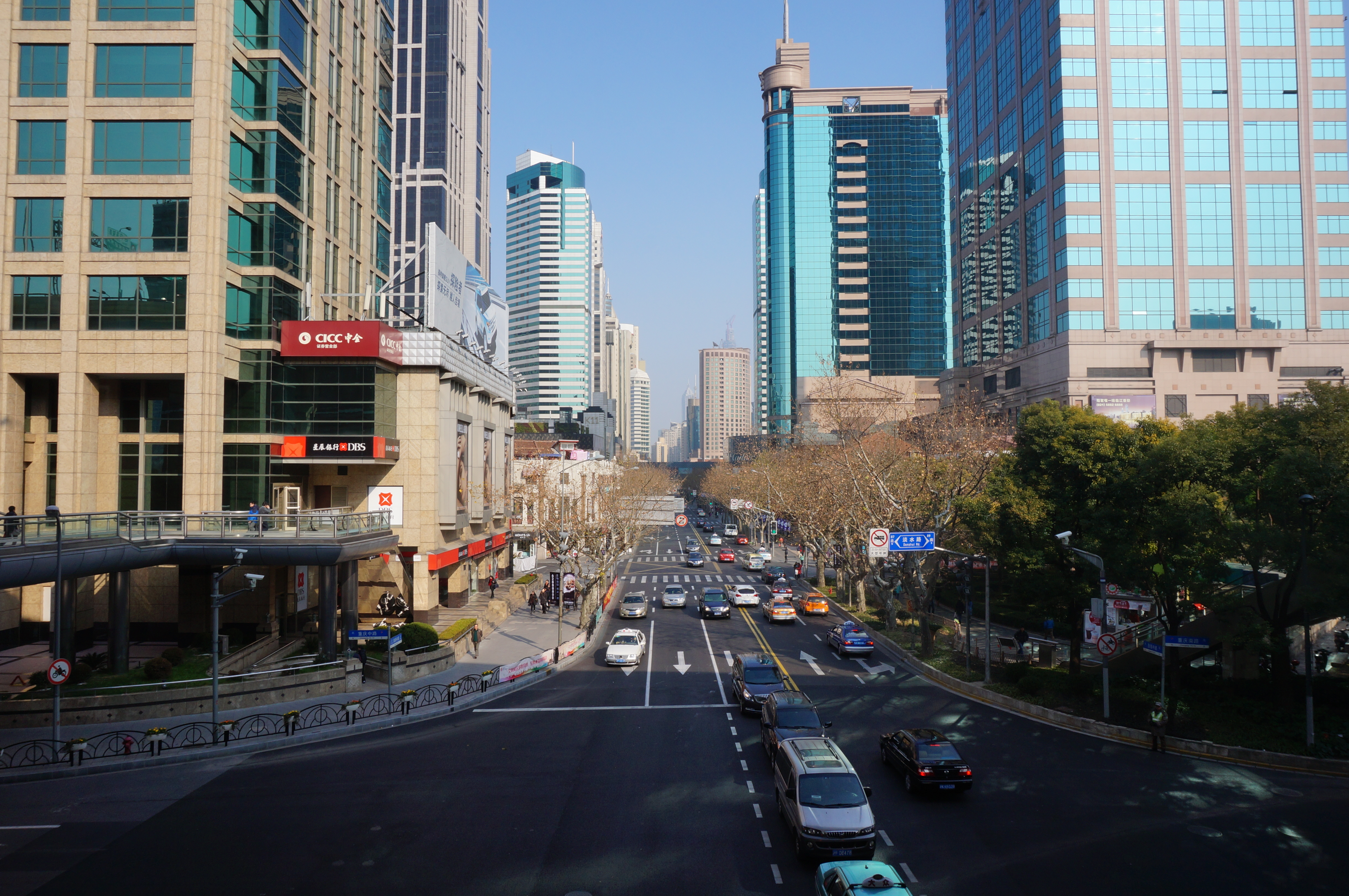
Eastern section of Middle Huaihai Road, view east in 2014

Huaihai Road or Huaihai Lu (Chinese: 淮海路; pinyin: Huáihǎi Lù; Shanghainese: Wahae Lu) is a road in Shanghai, China. The central section of Huaihai Road is one of the two major shopping streets in central Shanghai; the other is Nanjing Road. Compared with the more touristy Nanjing Road, Huaihai Road is more upscale, and is the preferred destination of local residents. Huaihai Road comprises three sections, the main section being Middle Huaihai Road in the former French Concession of Shanghai. Middle Huaihai Road is also well known by its former French name Avenue Joffre (Chinese: 霞飛路; pinyin: Xiáfēi Lù; Shanghainese: Iafi Lu). Huaihai Road East was in the original French Concession and was formerly known as Rue Ningpo (寧波路), while Huaihai Road West was an extra-settlement road built by the Shanghai International Settlement and formerly known as Jordan Road (喬敦路).

== Location ==
Today's Huaihai Road comprises three sections, which were formerly three distinct streets. West Huaihai Road, formerly called Jordan Road, is 1,510 meters (4,950 ft) long and forms part of the boundary between Changning District and Xuhui District. East Huaihai Road, formerly Ningbo Road, is 373 meters (1,224 ft) long and was the boundary road between Huangpu and Nanshi districts before the two districts merged. Middle Huaihai Road, the main section, is 5,500 meters (18,000 ft) long. Most of this section lies in the former Luwan District (which was also merged into Huangpu in 2010), and extends west into Xuhui and Changning districts.

== History ==
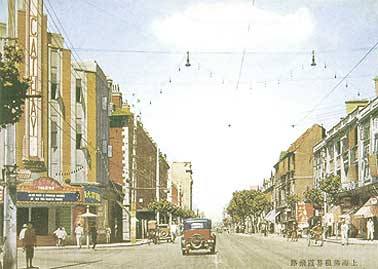
Intersection of Avenue Joffre with Rue Cardinal Mercier in the 1930s, with Cathay Theatre on the left.

=== Middle Huaihai Road ===
Middle Huaihai Road was built in 1901 as Rue Sikiang (Chinese: 西江路), after the Xi River. The eastern portion of the road east of Chungking Road (now Chongqing Road) was built first in the expanded French Concession, while the western portion was an extra-settlement road built as an extension to the initial Rue Sikiang. Five years later it was renamed Route Paul Brunat (Chinese: 寶昌路). In 1914 a further expansion of the French Concession took in the remainder of the road. It was renamed again in 1915 to Avenue Joffre to honor the French general Joseph Joffre, who visited Shanghai and attended an official renaming ceremony in 1922. The eastern portion of the road had a large concentration of shikumen residences, while the western portion was, by the 1920s, mostly lined with large houses and modern mansion blocks. In the 1920s Avenue Joffre became an enclave of a large community of Russians fleeing the Communist revolution in their homeland, which led to the middle section of the street becoming a commercial centre, lined with European-style shops, cafes and restaurants.

The Japanese occupied Shanghai during World War II, taking over the foreign concessions in 1941. In 1943 Avenue Joffre was renamed Taishan Road (Chinese: 泰山路) after Mount Taishan. The name only lasted two years, and after Japan was defeated the Kuomintang government renamed the street Lingsen Road in honor of Lin Sen (Ling Sen), the former President of the Republic of China who had died in 1943. However, the Communists in turn defeated the Kuomintang in the Chinese Civil War, and took over Shanghai in 1949. A year later the Communist government gave the street the current name, to commemorate its victorious Huaihai Campaign.

=== East Huaihai Road ===
The relatively short East Huaihai Road was built between 1874 and 1898 as Rue Ningpo. The road ran immediately north of the moat to the north of the city wall of the Shanghai old city. The road name comes from the fact that the road runs through land that was previously the property of the Siming Gongsuo, the fraternal association of residents with family origin in Ningbo, who established premises and a graveyard at this location in 1797. This area was granted to the French as part of the original French Concession in 1862, and the French authorities' attempt to resume land and relocate graves to build the road led to violent confrontations in 1874 and 1898. As part of the terms settling the dispute, the road was named after the association's home city. Rue Ningpo was renamed "East Huaihai Road" in 1950, thus avoiding the duplication of name with "Ningpo Road" in the former International Settlement.

=== West Huaihai Road ===
West Huahai Road was built as Jordan Road, an extra-settlement road, by the Shanghai Municipal Council (the governing authority of the Shanghai International Settlement). The road was mostly lined with high-end apartment buildings and large houses owned by Chinese and foreign elites. In the 1930s it was renamed Rockhill Avenue (Chinese: 陸家路), then West Huaihai Road in 1950.

== Shopping ==
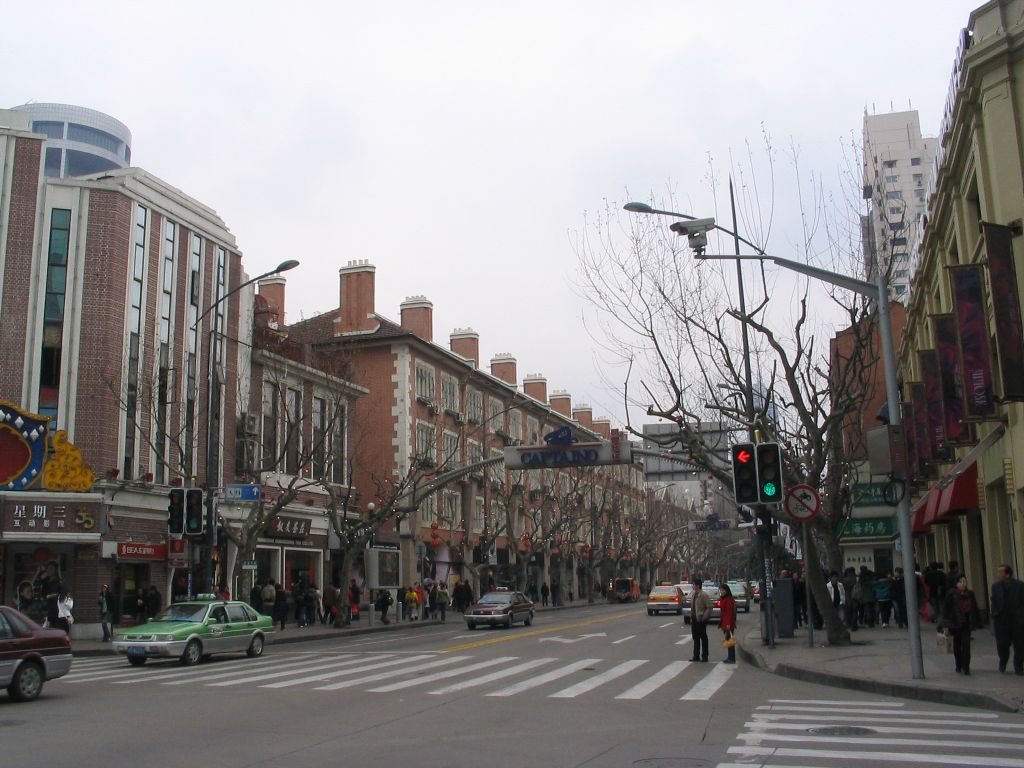
The same intersection (now of Middle Huaihai Road and South Maoming Road) in 2007

The 5.5-kilometer (3.4 mi) long Middle Huaihai Road has a large number of shops lining its route, from small boutiques to major department stores and shopping malls, as well as hotels and restaurants. Major buildings include IAPM Mall, Lippo Plaza, Shui On Plaza, Central Plaza, Shanghai Square, Shanghai Times Square, Hong Kong Plaza, and K11, most hosting shopping malls or department stores on the lower floors with offices on top.

The eastern section of Middle Huaihai Road near the popular Xintiandi precinct has recently seen an influx of a large number of Western luxury brands, including Louis Vuitton, Rolex, Coach, Inc., Salvatore Ferragamo S.p.A., Balenciaga, Dior, Burberry, Moschino, Valentino SpA, Versace, Dolce & Gabbana, Miu Miu, Marks & Spencer, UGG, Tiffany & Co., Cartier, Gucci, Prada, Victoria's Secret, Hermès, Vivienne Westwood, Giorgio Armani SpA, Chanel and Ermenegildo Zegna. Many of the stores were opened in 2010 to coincide with the Shanghai Expo.

== Transportation ==
A section of Line 1 of the Shanghai Metro runs underneath Middle Huaihai Road with three stations: Changshu Road (interchange with Line 7), South Shaanxi Road (interchange with Lines 10 and 12), and South Huangpi Road, all named after streets that intersect with Huaihai Road. The area is also served by Middle Huaihai Road Station on Line 13 while the western parts of the road are served by Shanghai Library Station (Line 10), Jiaotong University Station (Line 10 and 11) and Hongqiao Road Station (Line 3, 4 and 10). East Huaihai Road is served by the Dashijie Station on Metro Line 8.

== See also ==
- Wukang Mansion
- Wukang Road
- Xintiandi
