= St. Joseph's Church, Shanghai =

Church in Shanghai, China

Coordinates: 31°13′50″N 121°29′25″E

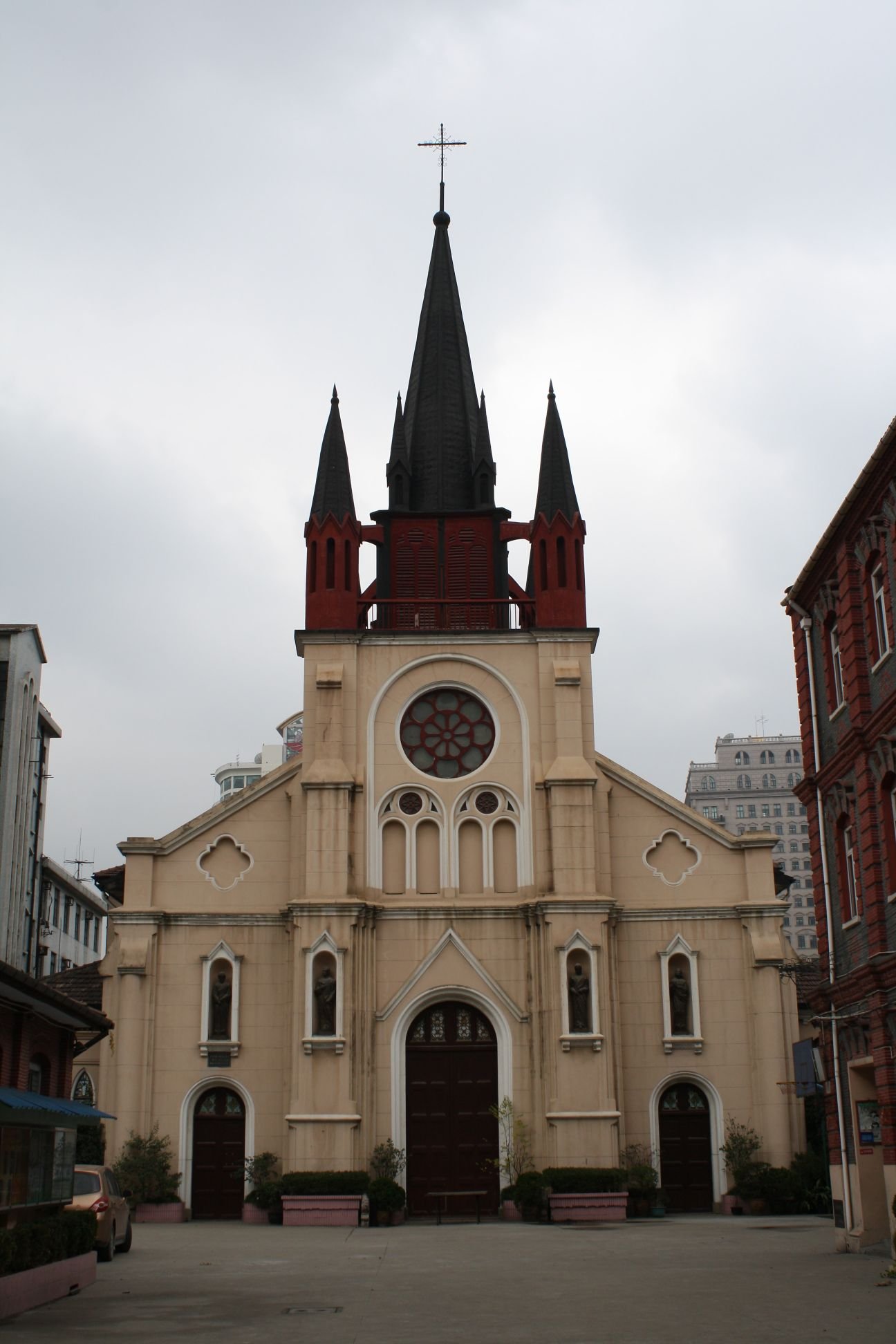
St. Joseph's Church

St. Joseph's Church (simplified Chinese: 圣若瑟堂; traditional Chinese: 聖若瑟堂; pinyin: Shèng Ruòsè Táng) at Yang-king-pang is a church in the Yangjingbang area of Huangpu District, Shanghai (near Dashijie). It is colloquially known as the Yang-king-pang or Yangjingbang Catholic Church (洋泾浜天主堂).

Located on one of the three parcels of land granted to the Catholic Church in the 1840s in compensation for the seizure of Jingyi Church during the suppression of Christianity of 1731, it was built by Father Louis Hélot between 1860 and 1861, in what was then the French Concession. It was consecrated in 1862. It was built in brick, in the Romanesque style with Gothic elements. It was closed in 1966 during the Cultural Revolution, and reopened in 1986, at which time the surrounding buildings continued to house a primary school.

== Photos ==
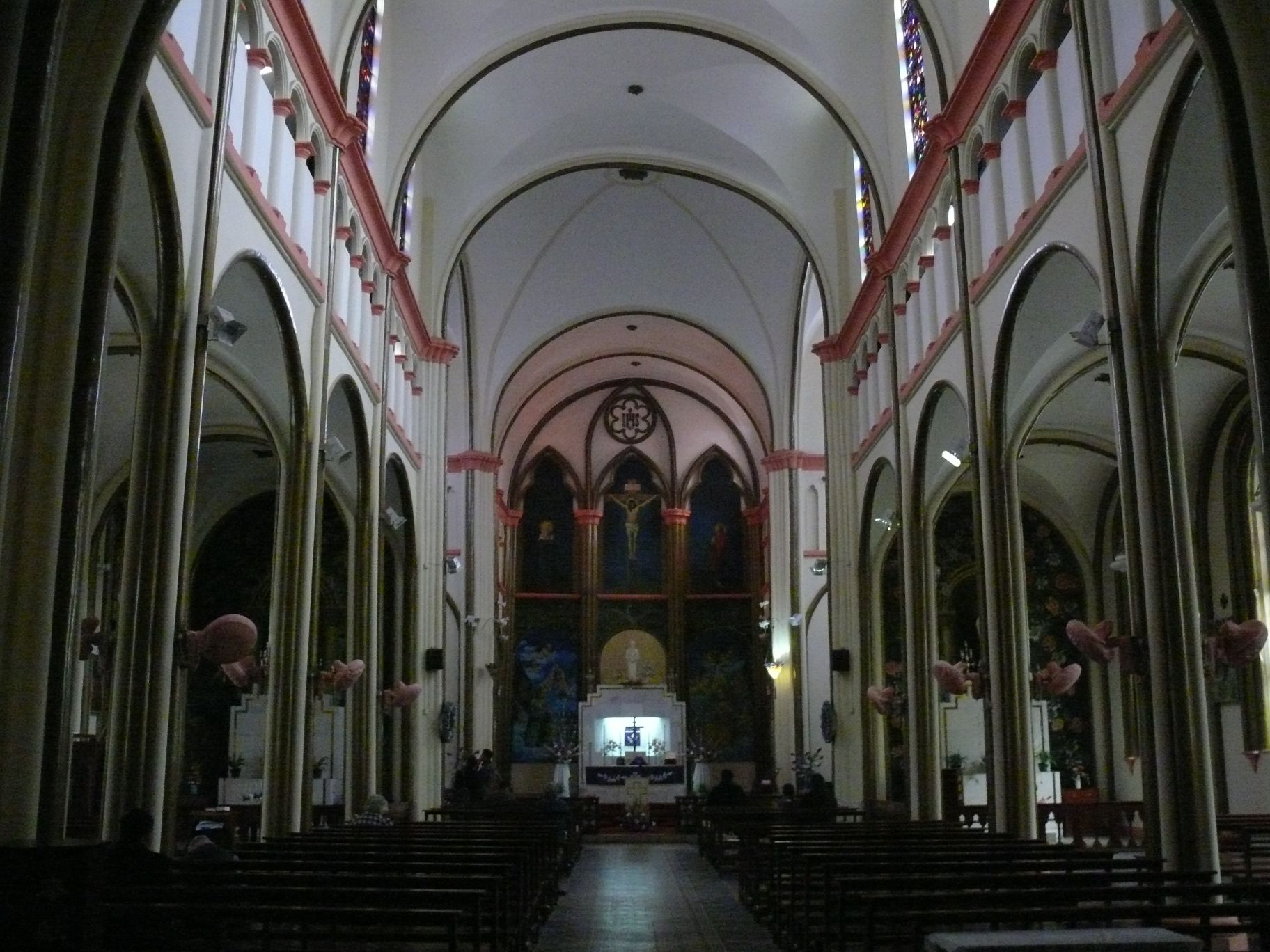
Nave

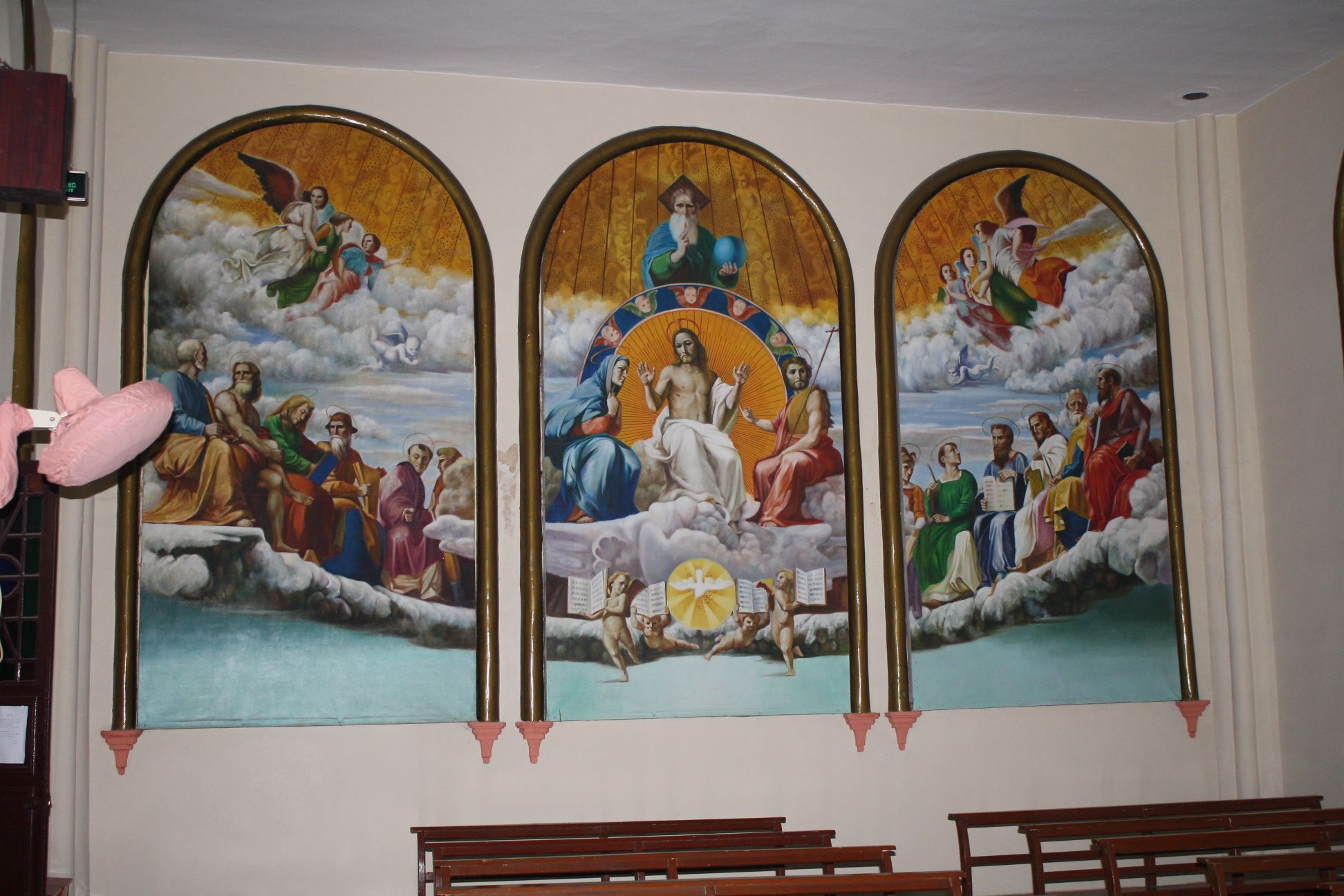
Transept decoration

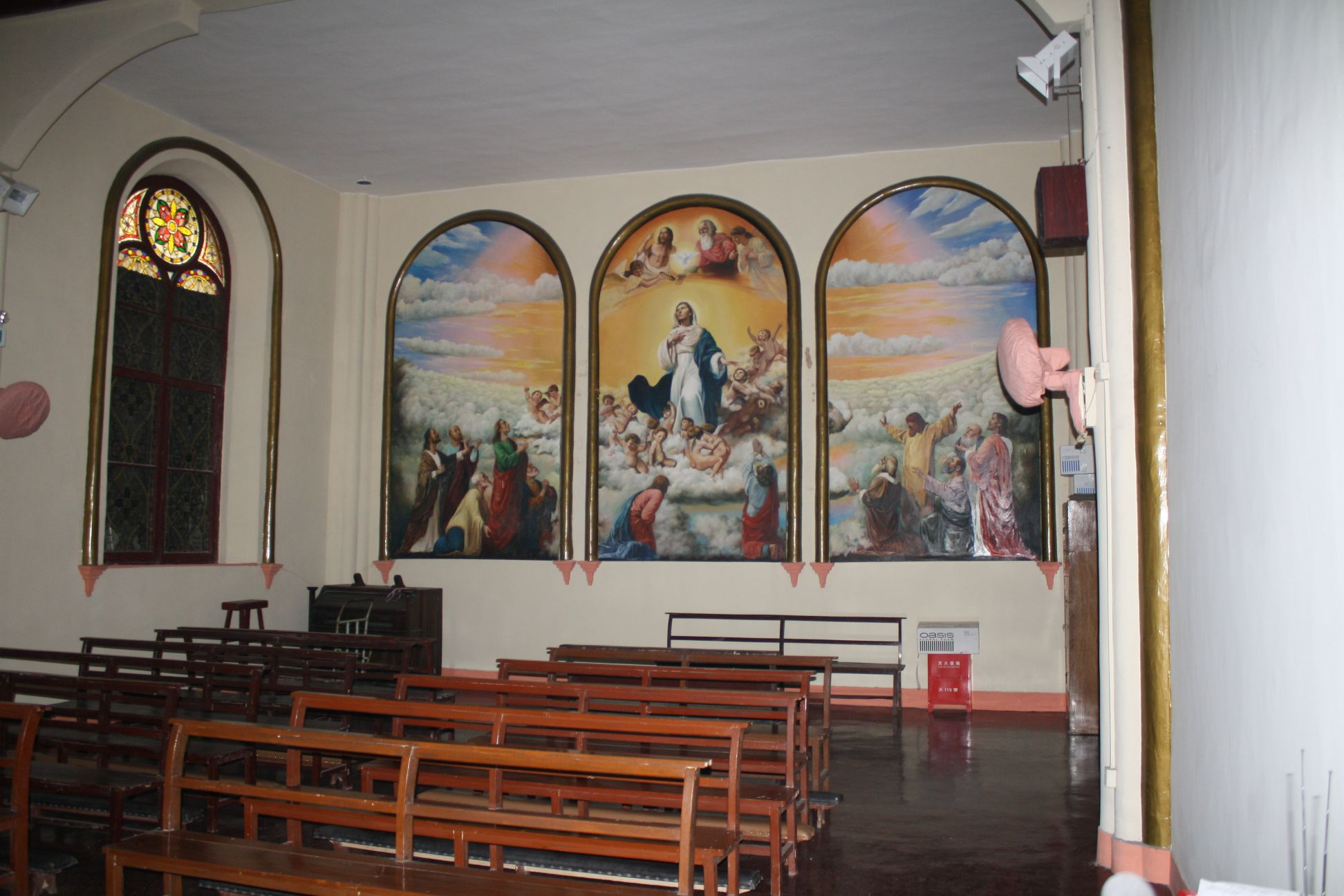
ditto

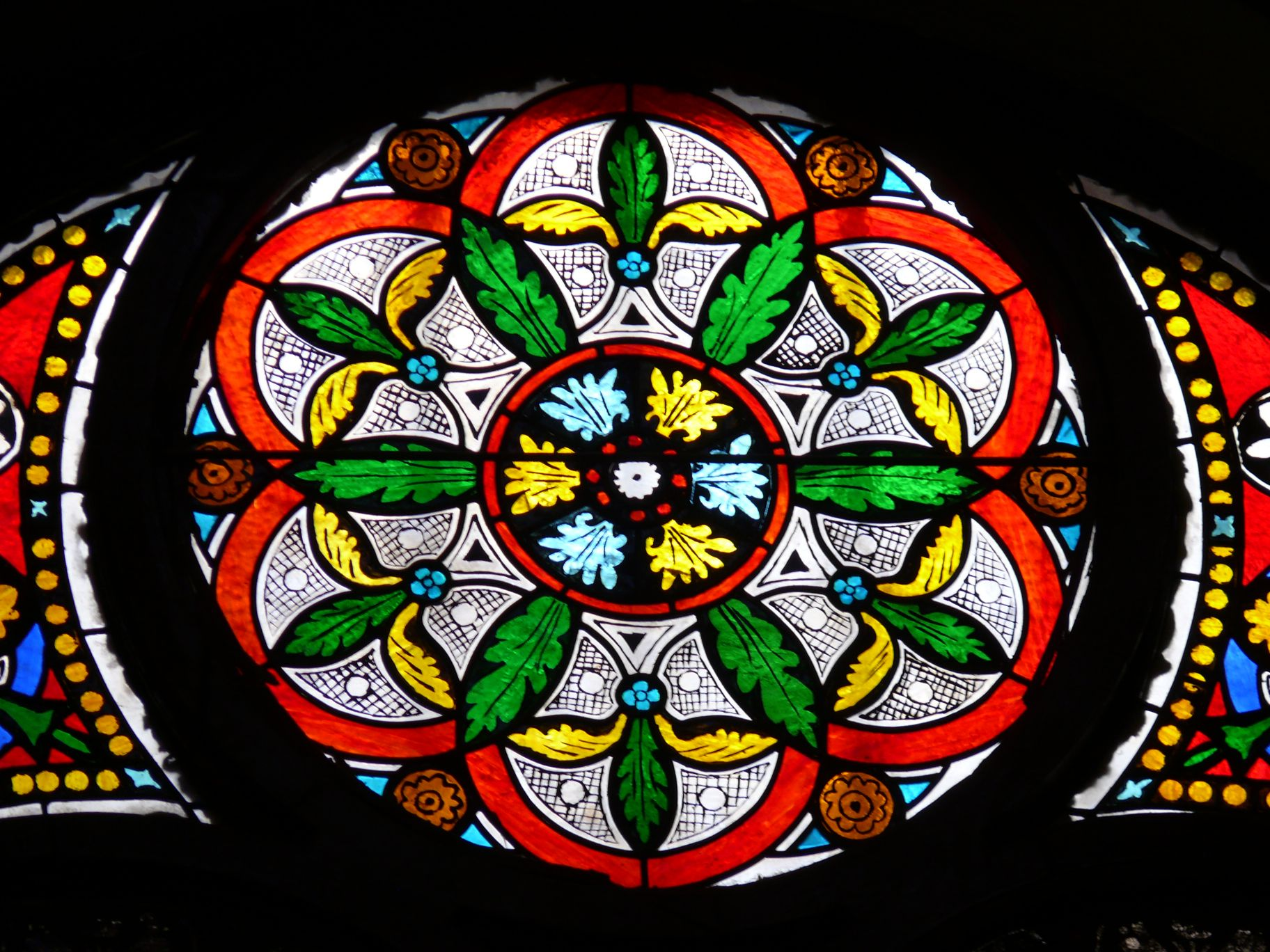
Stained-glass window detail
