= People's Square station (Shanghai Metro) =

Shanghai Metro interchange station

Coordinates: 31°13′59″N 121°28′26″E

People's Square 人民广场
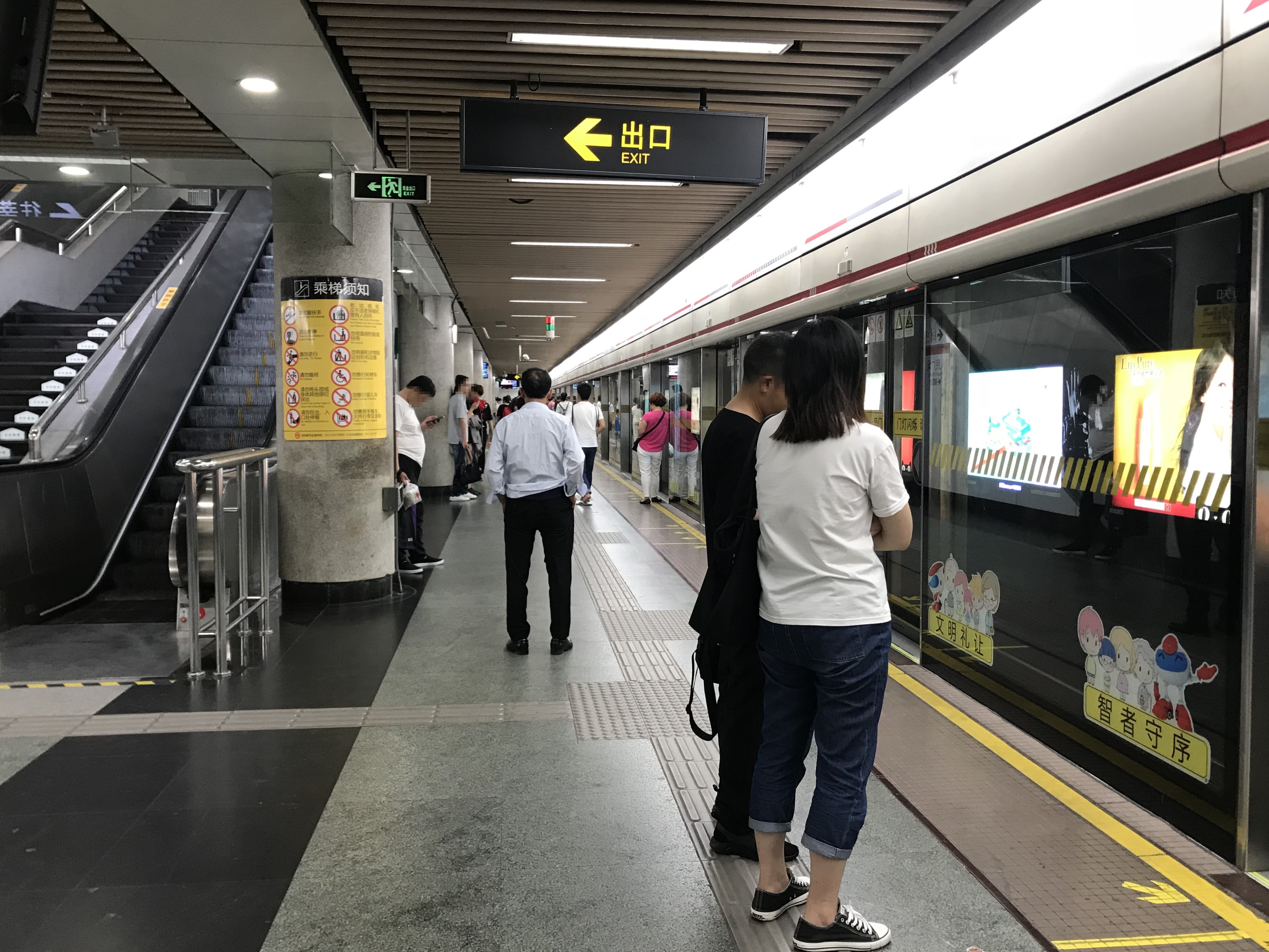
- Line 1 platform

General information
- Location: Middle Xizang Road and Jiujiang Road, Huangpu District, Shanghai; China
- Operator: Shanghai No. 1/2/4 Metro Operation Co. Ltd.
- Lines: Line 1; Line 2; Line 8
- Platforms: 7 (3 island platforms and 1 side platform)
- Tracks: 6

Construction
- Structure type: Underground
- Accessible: Yes

History
- Opened: 10 April 1995 (Line 1); 20 September 1999 (Line 2); 29 December 2007 (Line 8)
- Former names: People's Park (up to 19 August 2000)

Services
Preceding station	Shanghai Metro	Following station
Xinzha Road towards Fujin Road	Line 1	Site of the First CPC National Congress · South Huangpi Road towards Xinzhuang
West Nanjing Road towards Panxiang Road · Shanghai National Accounting Institute	Line 2	East Nanjing Road towards Pudong Airport Terminal 1&2
Qufu Road towards Shiguang Road	Line 8	Dashijie towards Shendu Highway
Location
- Location within Shanghai

People's Square (Chinese: 人民广场; pinyin: Rénmín Guǎngchǎng) is a large interchange station of the Shanghai Metro, located below People's Square, also next to People's Park and Nanjing Road, in the city center of Shanghai. The station is one of the busiest metro stations in mainland China, handling a peak daily traffic of over 700,000 passengers.

The opening of the downtown sections of Lines 12 and 13 in late December 2015 has allowed for alternative routes around the station, reducing the daily traffic by around 10%.

The station is an interchange between Lines 1, 2 and 8, making it an important interchange station boasting close to twenty exits. This station is exceptionally busy because of a unique combination of it being an interchange between a west-east and north-south line, as well as being surrounded by office buildings, shopping malls and several tourist attractions. This combination causes it to be extremely busy during peak times, but it remains very busy during the rest of the day as well.

In early 2009, a new side platform for Line 8 riders heading south (to Shendu Highway) opened. This platform was converted from a former link to Line 1. Passengers from Shiguang Road station heading south can exit from either door.

Since 2013, in the station hall of People's Square the Metro operator set up a music corner. Every Saturday, both professional and amateur musicians and artists hit the stage. The tiny music corner has become a bridge for cultural exchanges. At the 500th show in September 2018, Matt Knowles — director of culture and education at the British Council in Shanghai - said what made it so special was that Shanghai Metro had turned a commercial space into a cultural one, giving people a chance to pause and reflect.

== Places nearby ==
- People's Park
- People's Square
- Nanjing Road shopping street
- Fuzhou Road
- Shanghai Concert Hall
- Yan'an Park
- Huaihai Road
- Taiwan Strait Tourism Association Shanghai Office

== Gallery ==
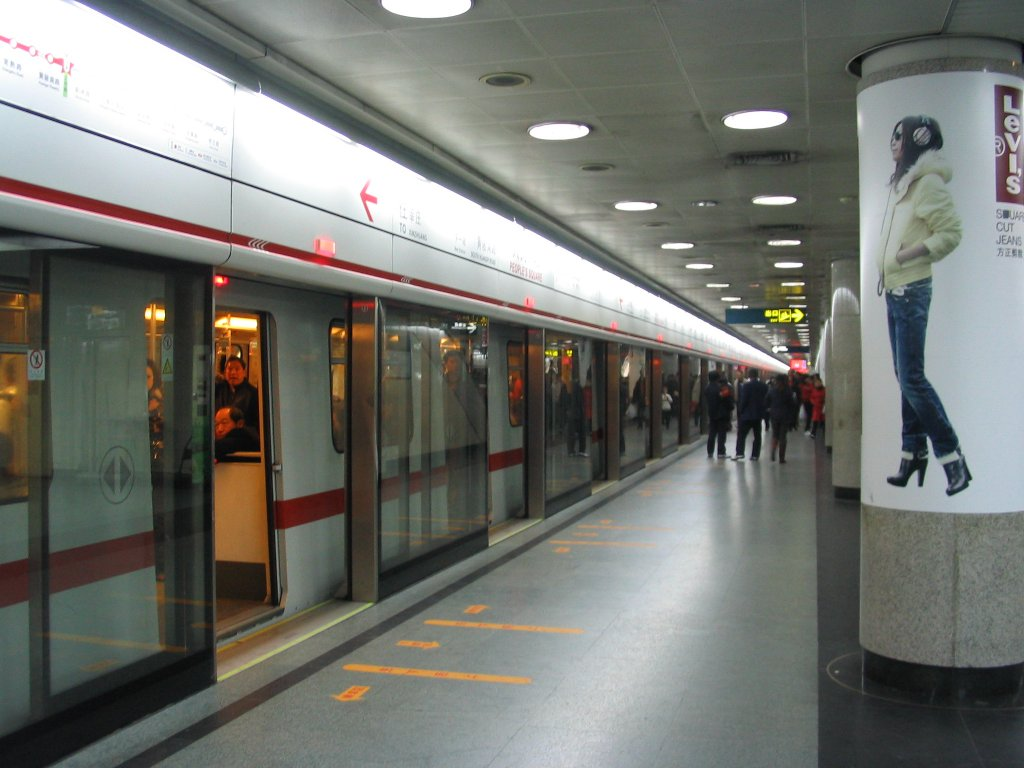
Line 1 platform, February 2007.

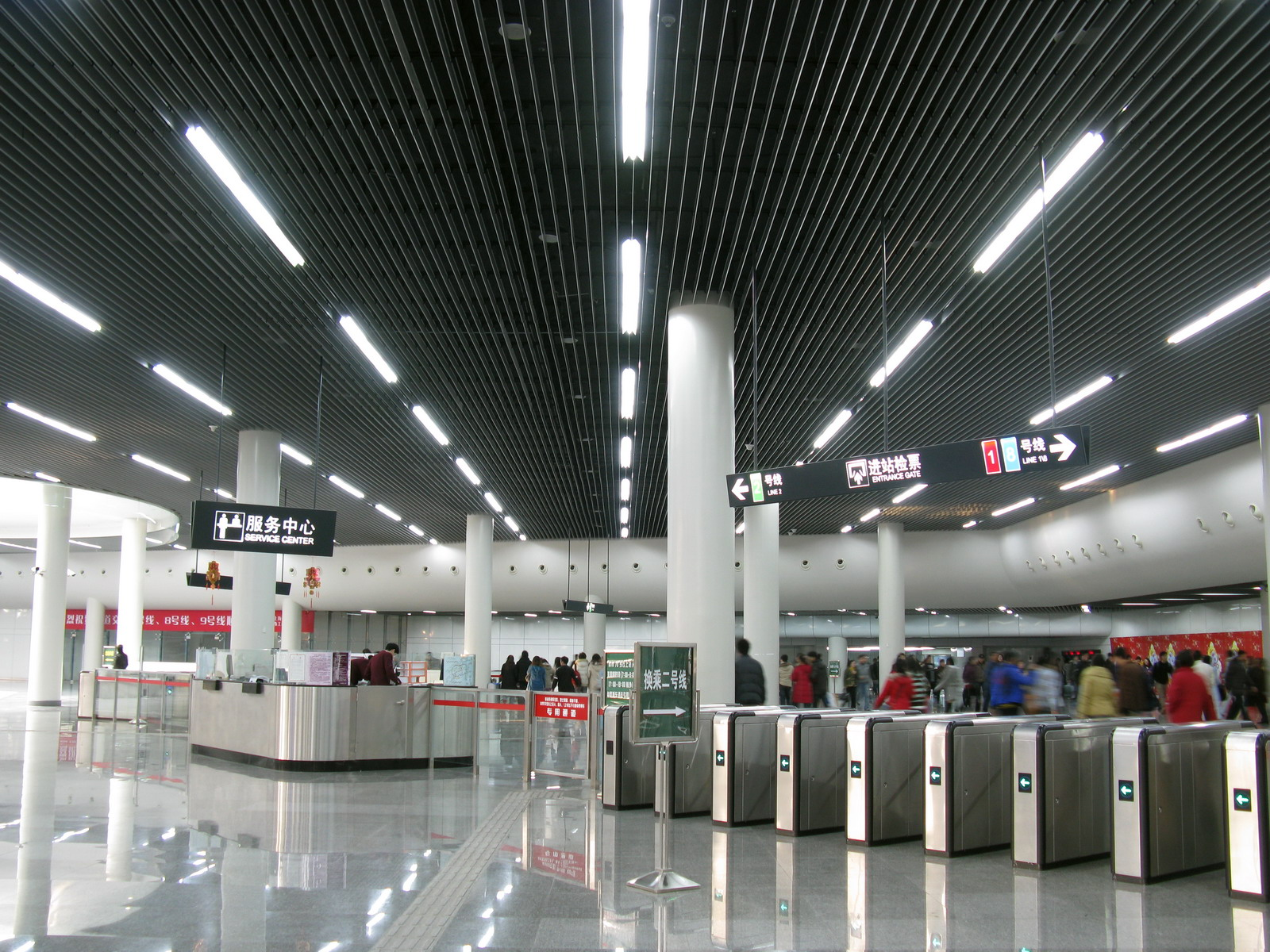
Station concourse.

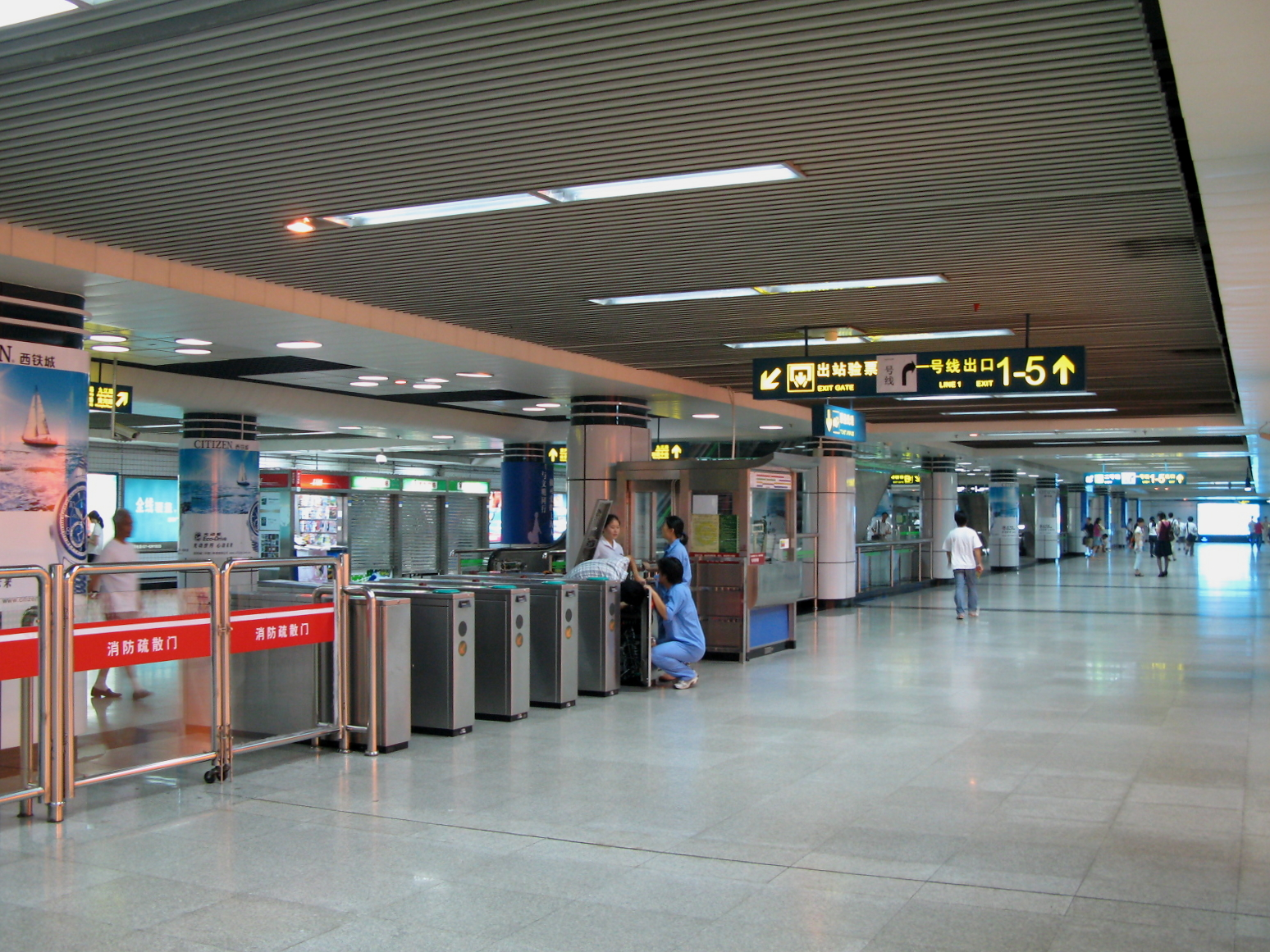
Line 2 concourse

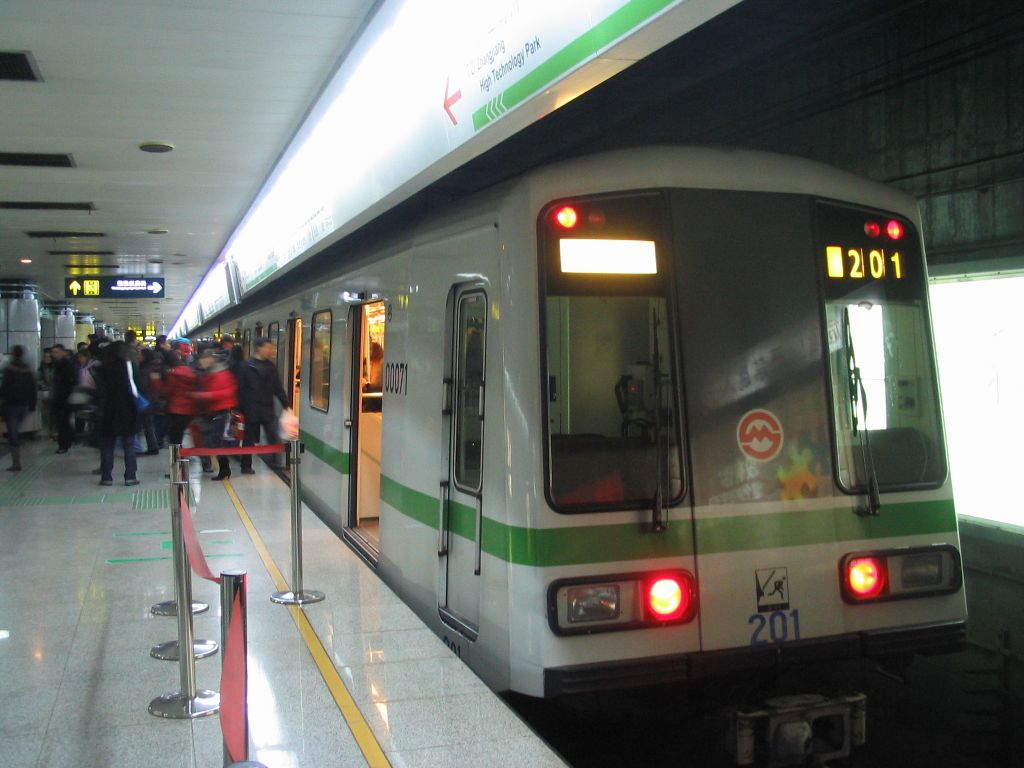
Line 2 platform as of February 2006.

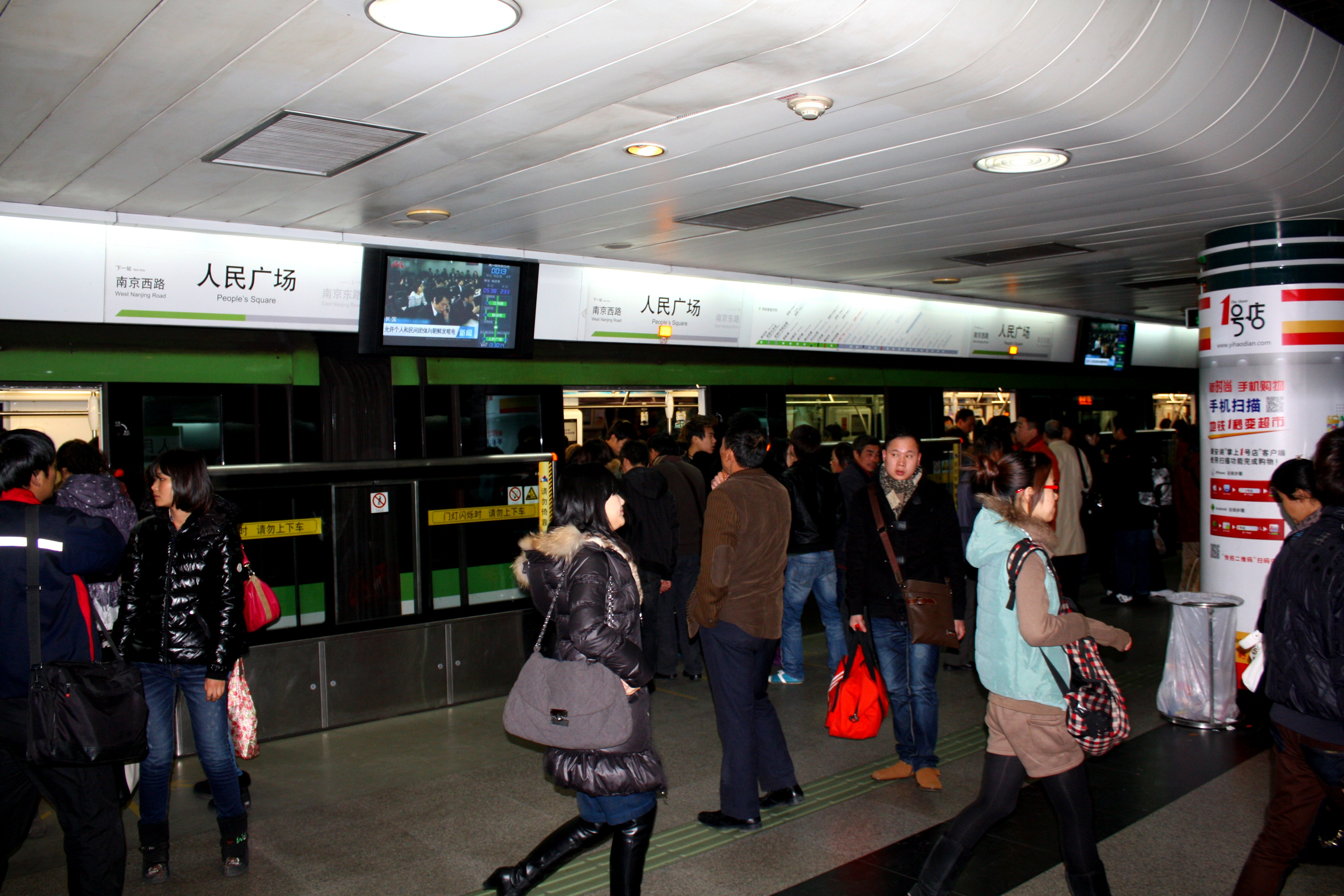
Line 2 platform as of 22 December 2011.

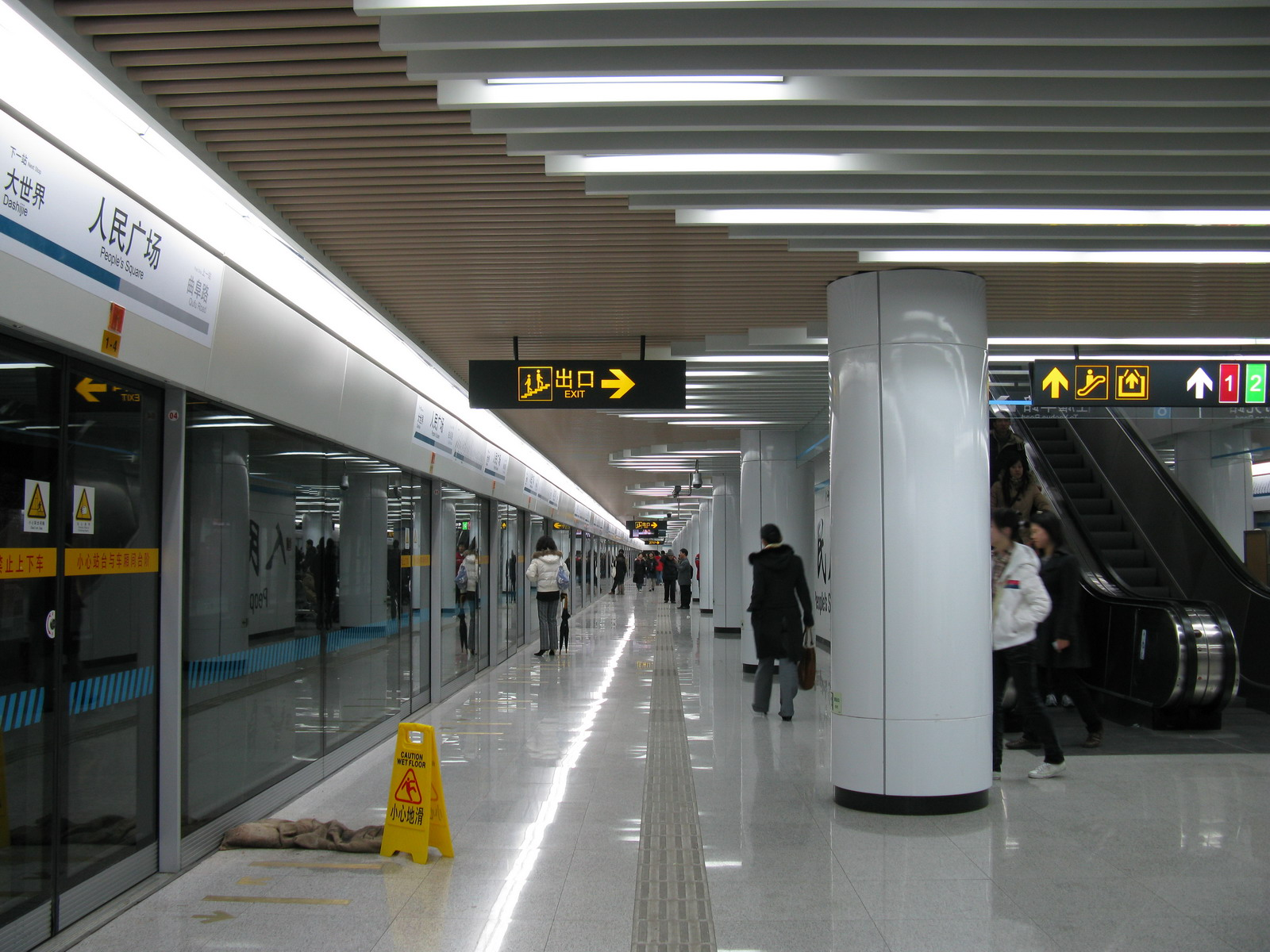
Line 8 central platform as of February 2008.

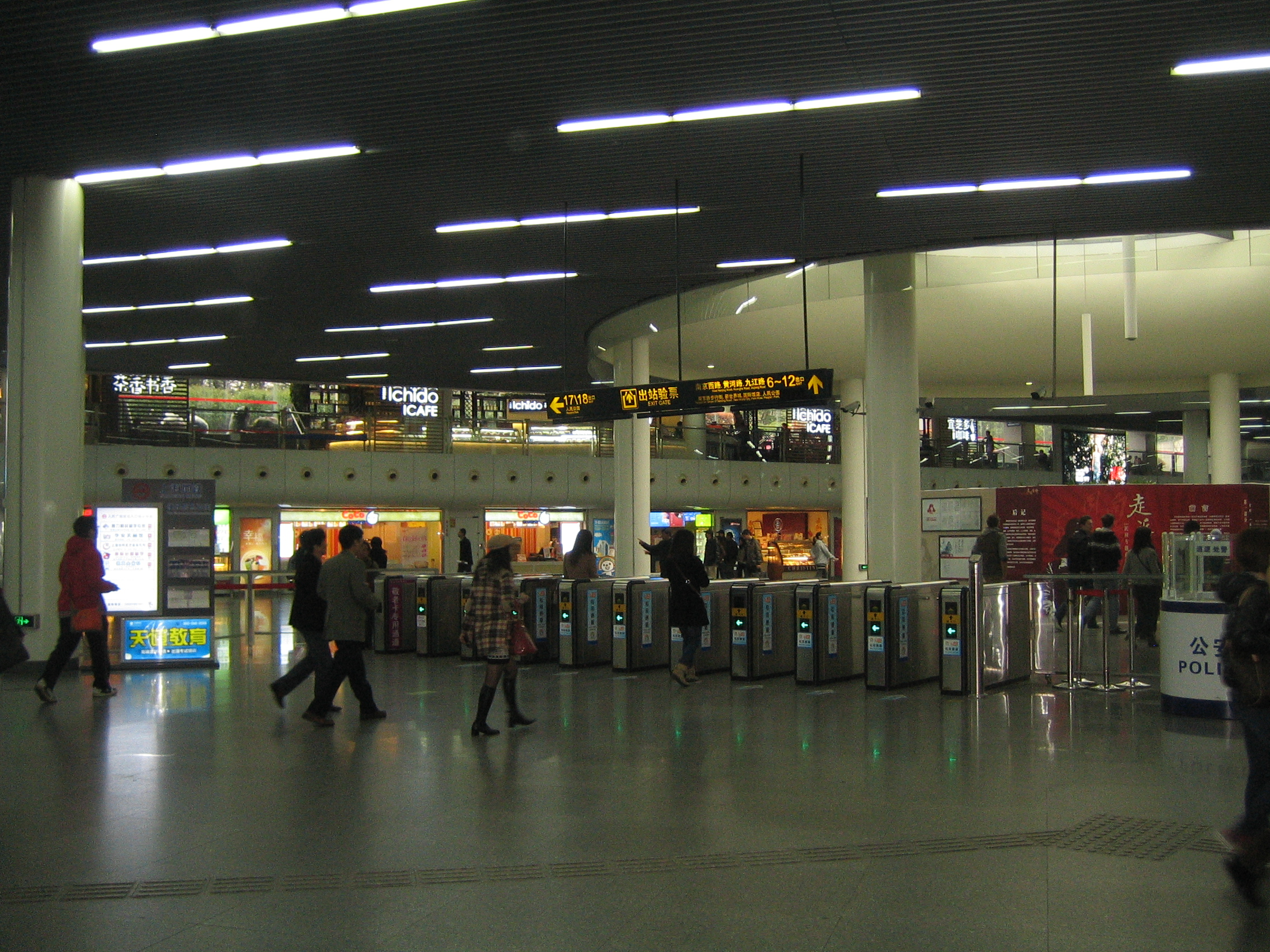
Exit Gates, Line 2 Concourse
