= Dashijie station =

Shanghai Metro station

Dashijie 大世界
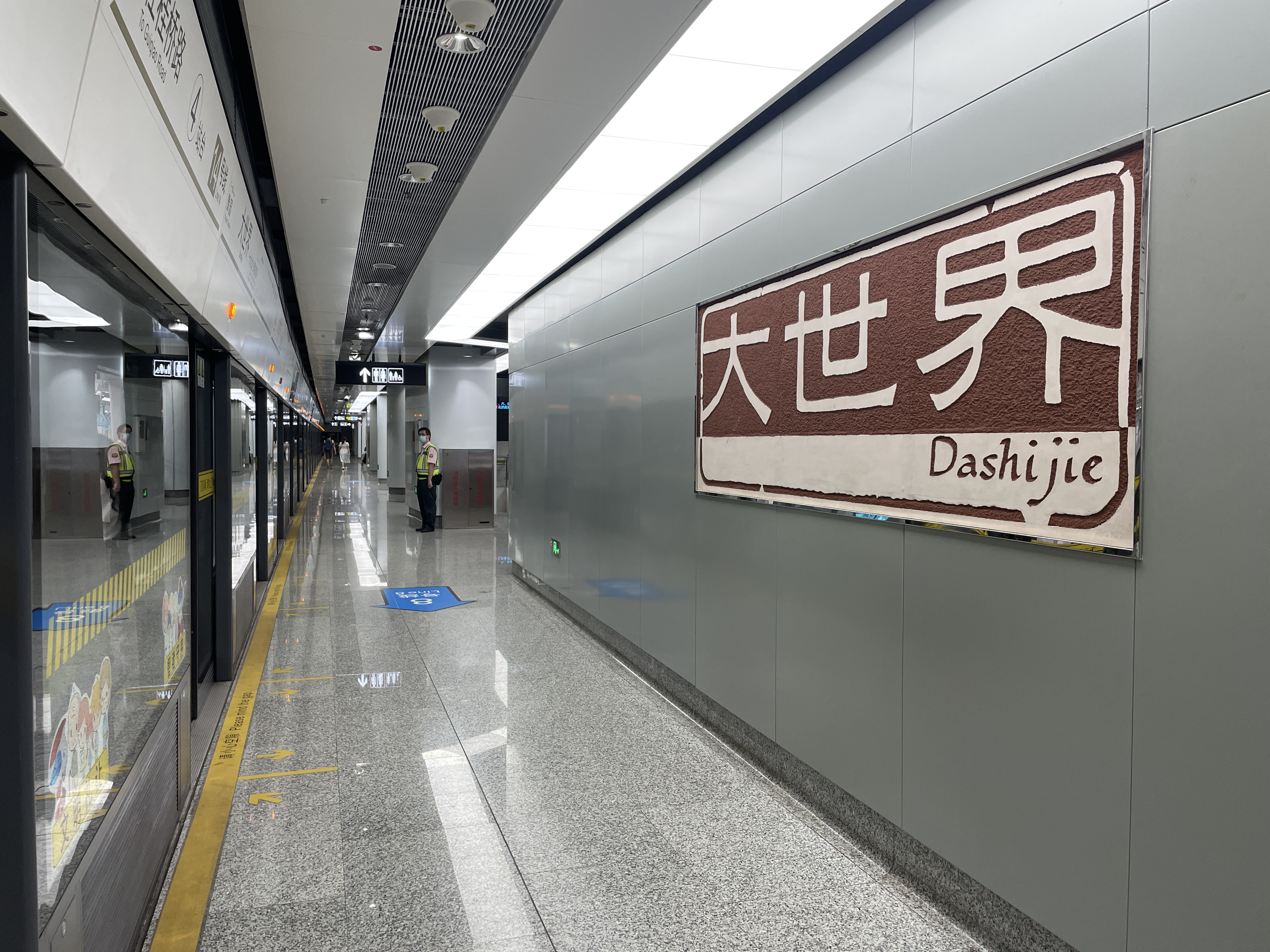
- Platforms of Line 14

General information
- Location: South Xizang Road, Middle Jinling Road and East Jinling Road; Huangpu District, Shanghai, Zhejiang; China
- Coordinates: 31°13′45″N 121°28′29″E
- System: Shanghai Metro station
- Operator: Shanghai No. 4 Metro Operation Co. Ltd.
- Lines: Line 8; Line 14
- Platforms: 4 (2 island platforms)
- Tracks: 4

Construction
- Structure type: Underground
- Platform levels: 2
- Accessible: Yes

History
- Opened: 19 December 2007 (Line 8); 30 December 2021 (Line 14)

Services
Preceding station	Shanghai Metro	Following station
People's Square towards Shiguang Road	Line 8	Laoximen towards Shendu Highway
Site of the First CPC National Congress · South Huangpi Road towards Fengbang	Line 14	Yuyuan Garden towards Guiqiao Road
Location

Dashijie (Chinese: 大世界; pinyin: Dàshìjiè; lit. 'Great World') is a station on Shanghai Metro Line 8 and Line 14. It began operation on 29 December 2007 and became an interchange station with Line 14 on 30 December 2021. The station is linked to an underground shopping complex containing a McDonald's and other fast food outlets. The station is named after the Great World entertainment complex (in Chinese, "Da Shijie"), traditionally Shanghai's largest amusement arcade.

== Station layout ==
1F	Ground level	Exits
B1	Concourse	Tickets, Service Center
B2	Platform 3	← Line 14 towards Fengbang (Site of the First CPC National Congress · South Huangpi Road)
B2	Island platform, doors open on the left
B2	Platform 4	Line 14 towards Guiqiao Road (Yuyuan Garden) →
B3	Platform 1	← Line 8 towards Shiguang Road (People's Square)
B3	Island platform, doors open on the left
B3	Platform 2	Line 8 towards Shendu Highway (Laoximen) →

=== Entrances/exits ===
Dashijie has six exits. Exit 2 is only for exit.

- 1: Ninghai Road (E), Xizang Road (S), Yunnan Road (S), The Great World
- 2: Jinling Road (E)
- 3: Jinling Road (M)
- 4: Xizang Road (S), Yan'an Road (E), Shanghai Concert Hall
- 5: Yunnan Road (S), Jinling Road (E)
- 6: Xizang Road (S), Jinling Road (E), Huaihai Road (E)

== Attractions and landmarks nearby ==
- Great World
- Shanghai Concert Hall
- St. Joseph's Church, Shanghai
