= Site of the First CPC National Congress · South Huangpi Road station =

Shanghai Metro station

Site of the First CPC National Congress · South Huangpi Road 一大会址·黄陂南路
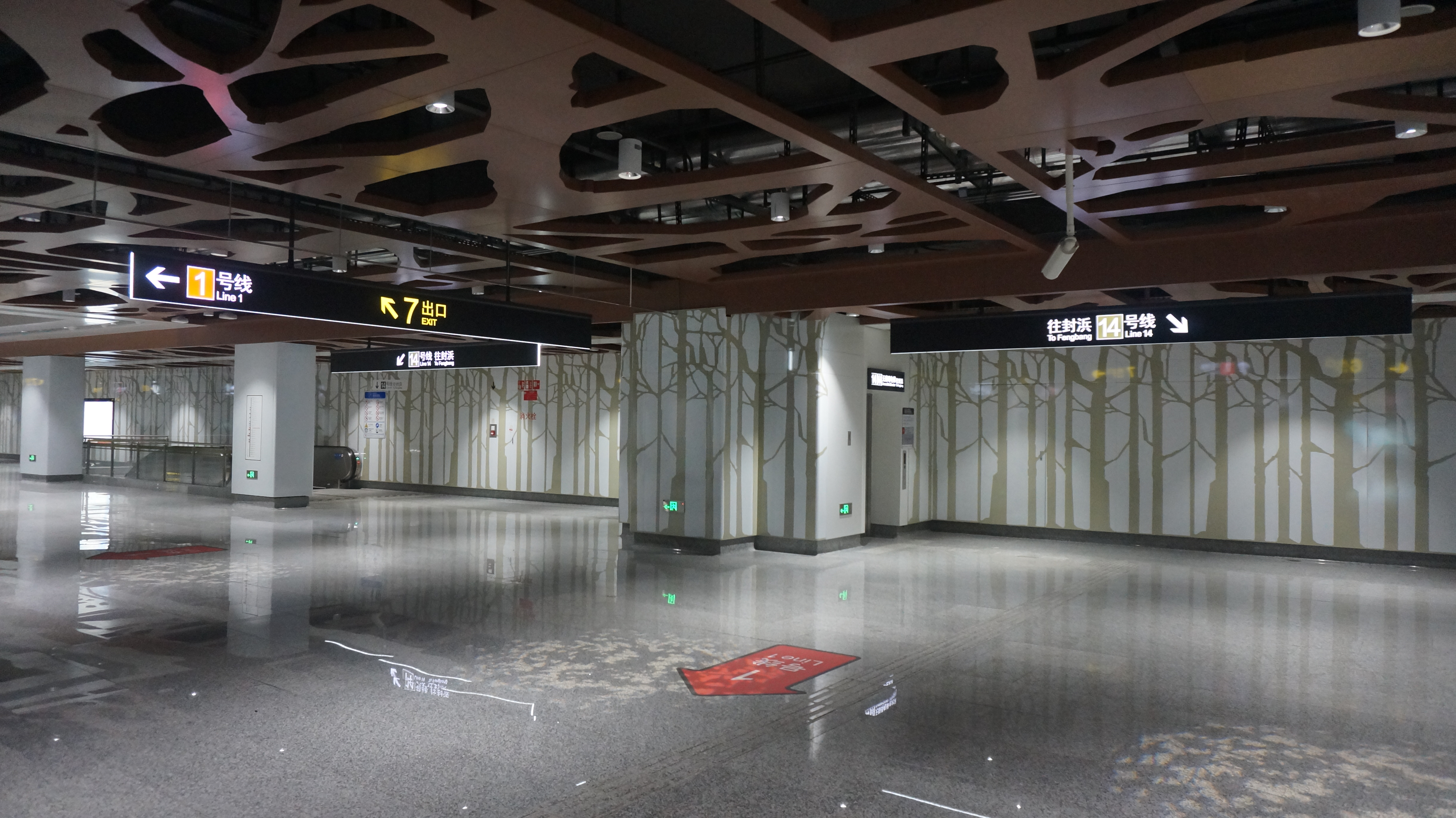
- Station hall on Line 14

General information
- Location: Middle Huaihai Road and South Huangpi Road; Huangpu District, Shanghai; China
- Coordinates: 31.225295°N 121.468655°E
- Operator: Shanghai No. 1 Metro Operation Co. Ltd.
- Lines: Line 1; Line 14
- Platforms: 4 (1 island platform and 2 side platforms)
- Tracks: 4

Construction
- Structure type: Underground
- Accessible: Yes

Other information
- Station code: L01/12 (Line 1)

History
- Opened: 10 April 1995 (Line 1); 30 December 2021 (Line 14)
- Former names: South Huangpi Road (up to 20 June 2021)

Services
Preceding station	Shanghai Metro	Following station
People's Square towards Fujin Road	Line 1	South Shaanxi Road towards Xinzhuang
Jing'an Temple towards Fengbang	Line 14	Dashijie towards Guiqiao Road
Location
- Location within Shanghai

Site of the First CPC National Congress · South Huangpi Road (Chinese: 一大会址·黄陂南路; pinyin: Yīdà Huìzhǐ Huángpí Nán Lù) is an interchange station on lines 1 and 14 of the Shanghai Metro; line 1 opened on 10 April 1995 as part of the section between Jinjiang Park and Shanghai Railway Station; It became an interchange station on 31 December 2021 with the opening of line 14.

On 20 June 2021, to celebrate the 100th Anniversary of the Chinese Communist Party, the station name changed from South Huangpi Road Station to Site of the First CPC National Congress · South Huangpi Road Station. Nearby Xintiandi station was also renamed to Site of the First CPC National Congress · Xintiandi station.

The station is situated within the Inner Ring Road and adjacent to Middle Huaihai Road, the major up-market shopping street in Shanghai.

The neighbourhood in the vicinity was a residential district in the old French Concession. In recent years, the area was bought by a property developer and turned into an expensive restaurant district. Large-scale demolition has reduced the number of residents in the area, and replaced them with restaurants and large, Hong Kong-style shopping malls.

== Station layout ==
G	Entrances and Exits	Exits 1-7
B1	Line 1 Concourse	Faregates, Station Agent
B1	Line 14 Concourse	Faregates, Station Agent
B2	Side platform, doors open on the right
B2	Northbound	← Line 14 towards Fengbang (Jing'an Temple)
B2	Southbound	Line 14 towards Guiqiao Road (Dashijie) →
B2	Side platform, doors open on the right
B2	Northbound	← Line 1 towards Fujin Road (People's Square)
B2	Island platform, doors open on the left
B2	Southbound	Line 1 towards Xinzhuang (South Shaanxi Road) →

== Places nearby ==
- Huaihai Road (M.), shopping street
- Xintiandi, shopping and nightlife area
- Museum of the First National Congress of the Chinese Communist Party

== Gallery ==
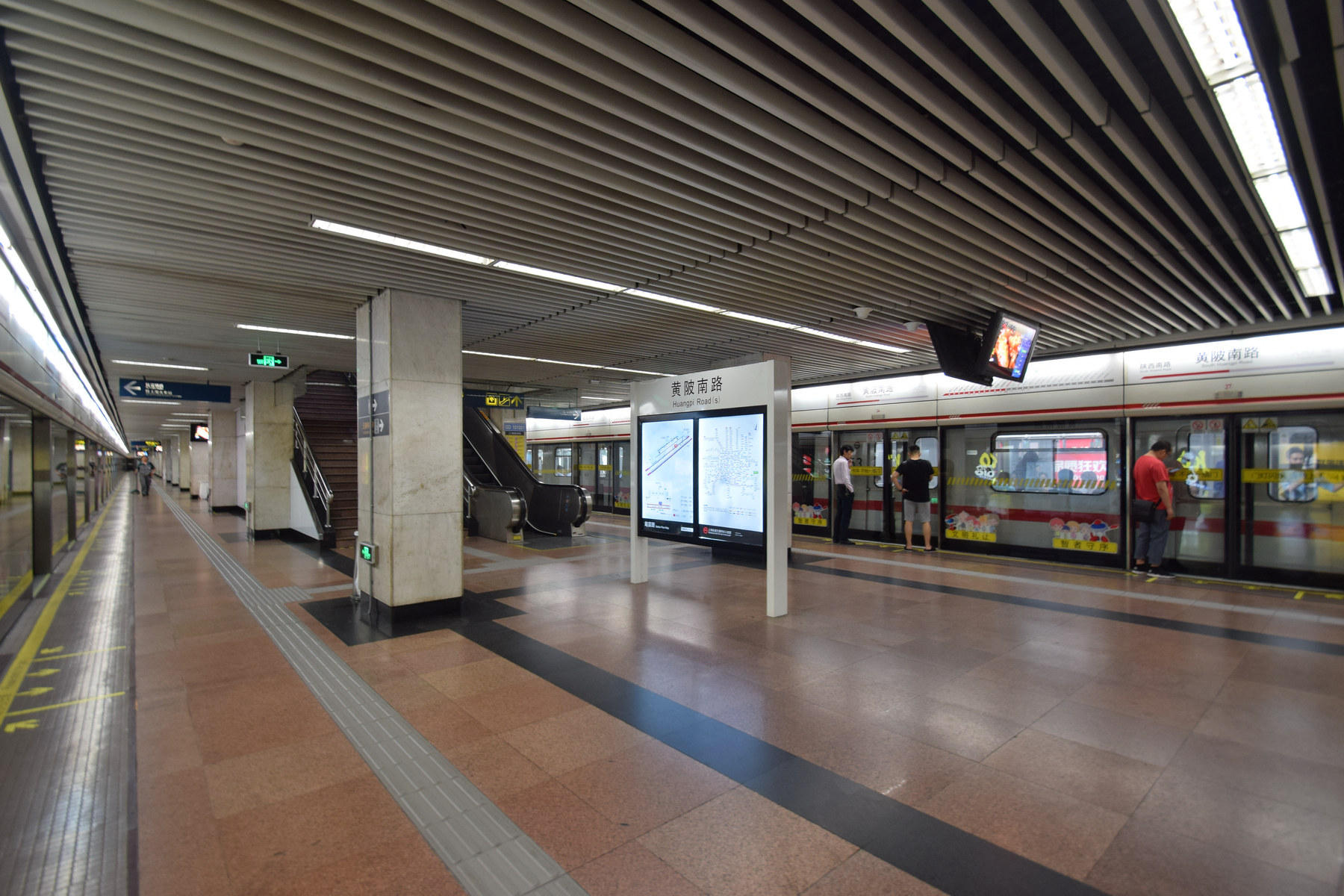
Line 1 platform (before the name change)

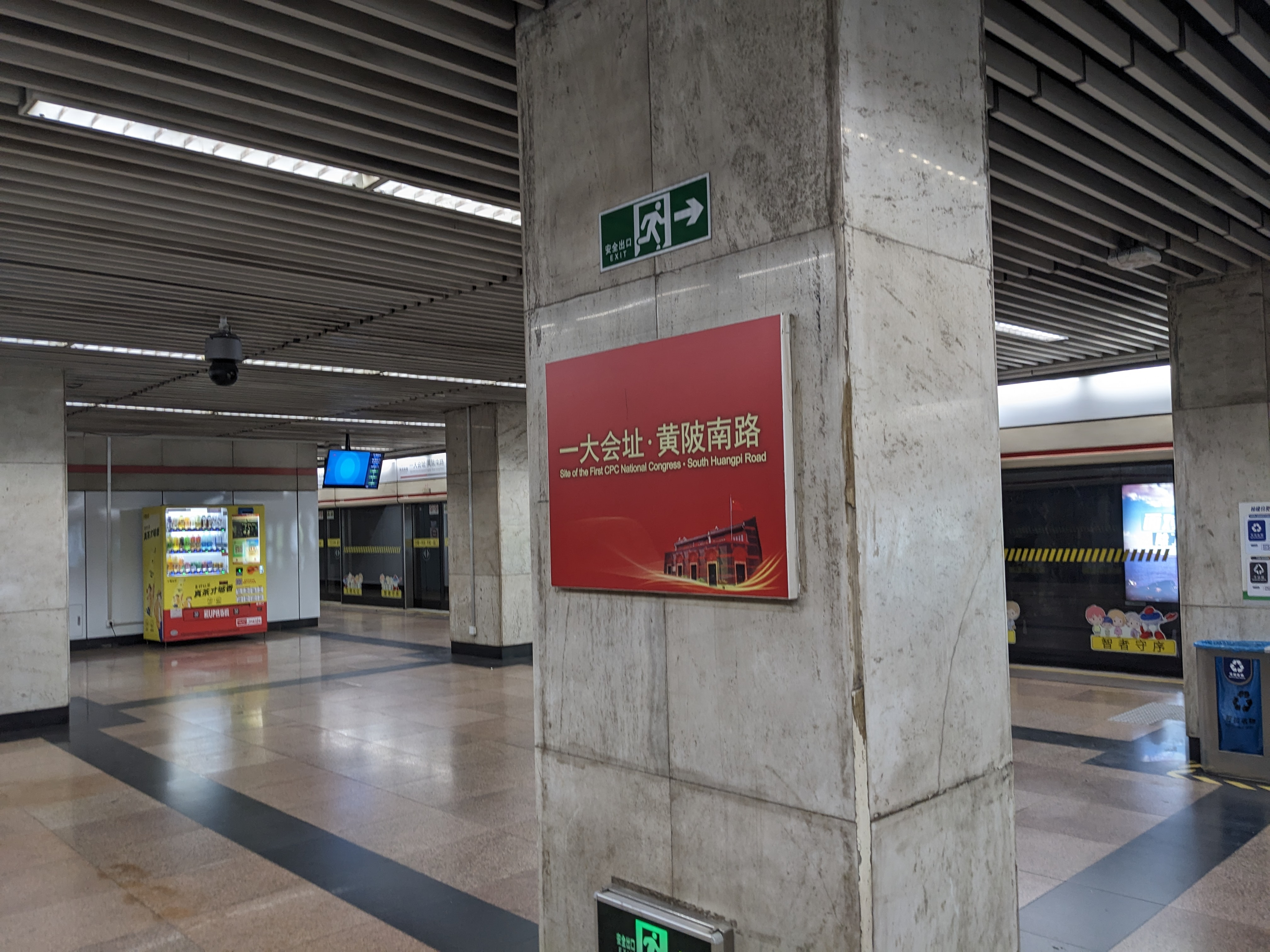
Line 1 platform (after the name change)

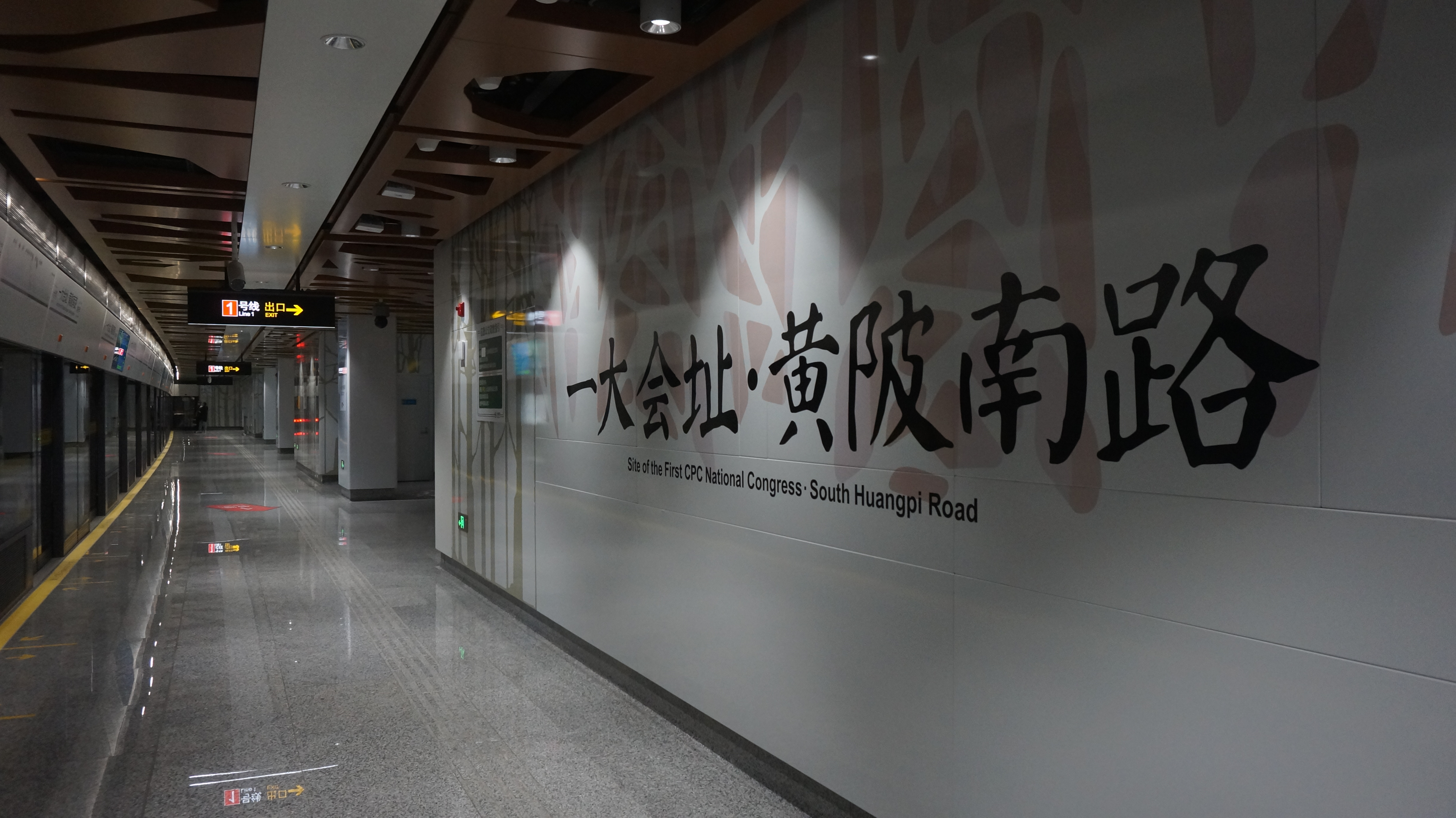
Line 14 platform sign

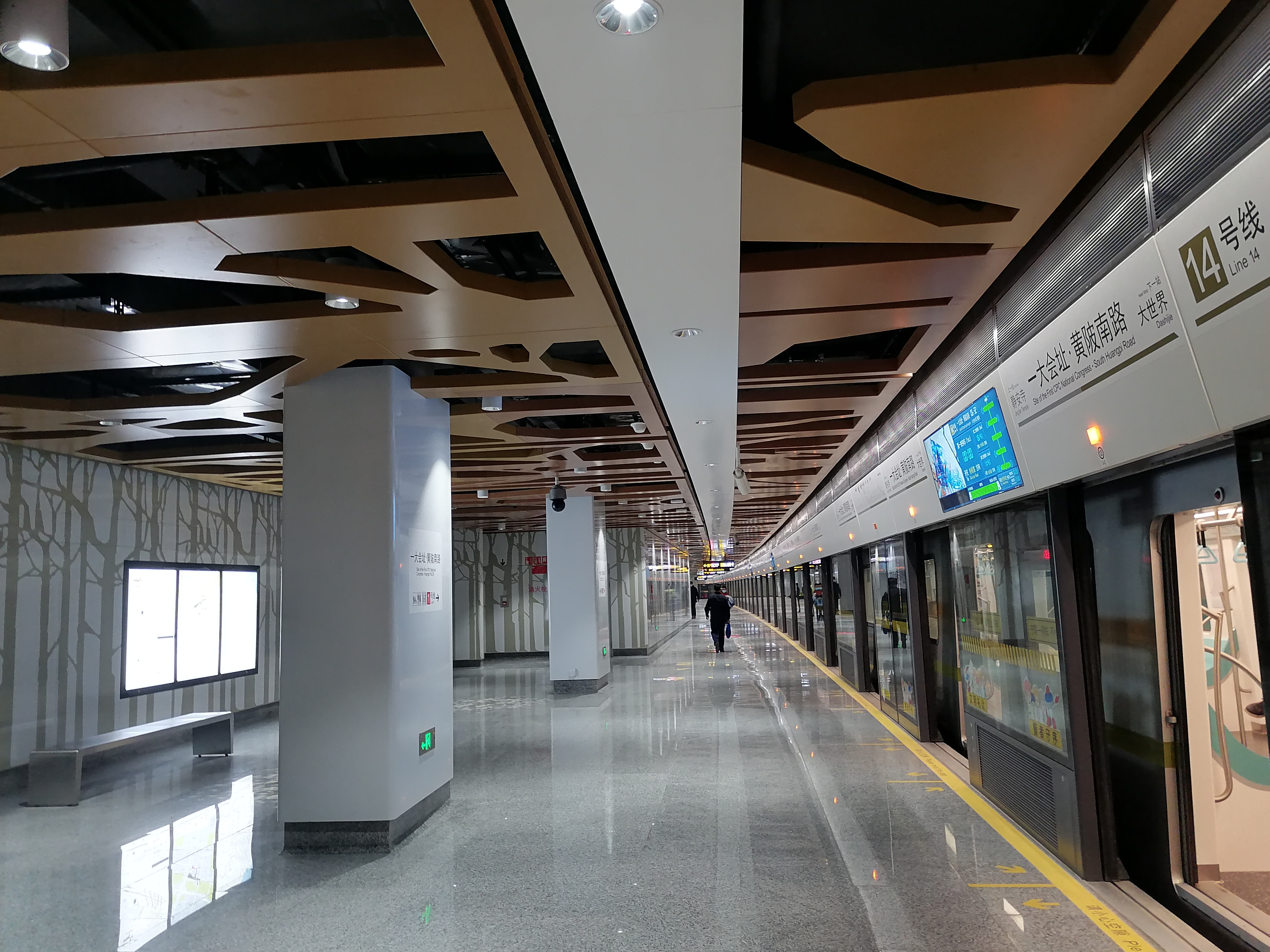
Line 14 platform

== See also ==
- Site of the First National Congress of the Chinese Communist Party
