= Site of the First National Congress of the Chinese Communist Party =

Historic building and museum in Shanghai, China

- 中共一大会址
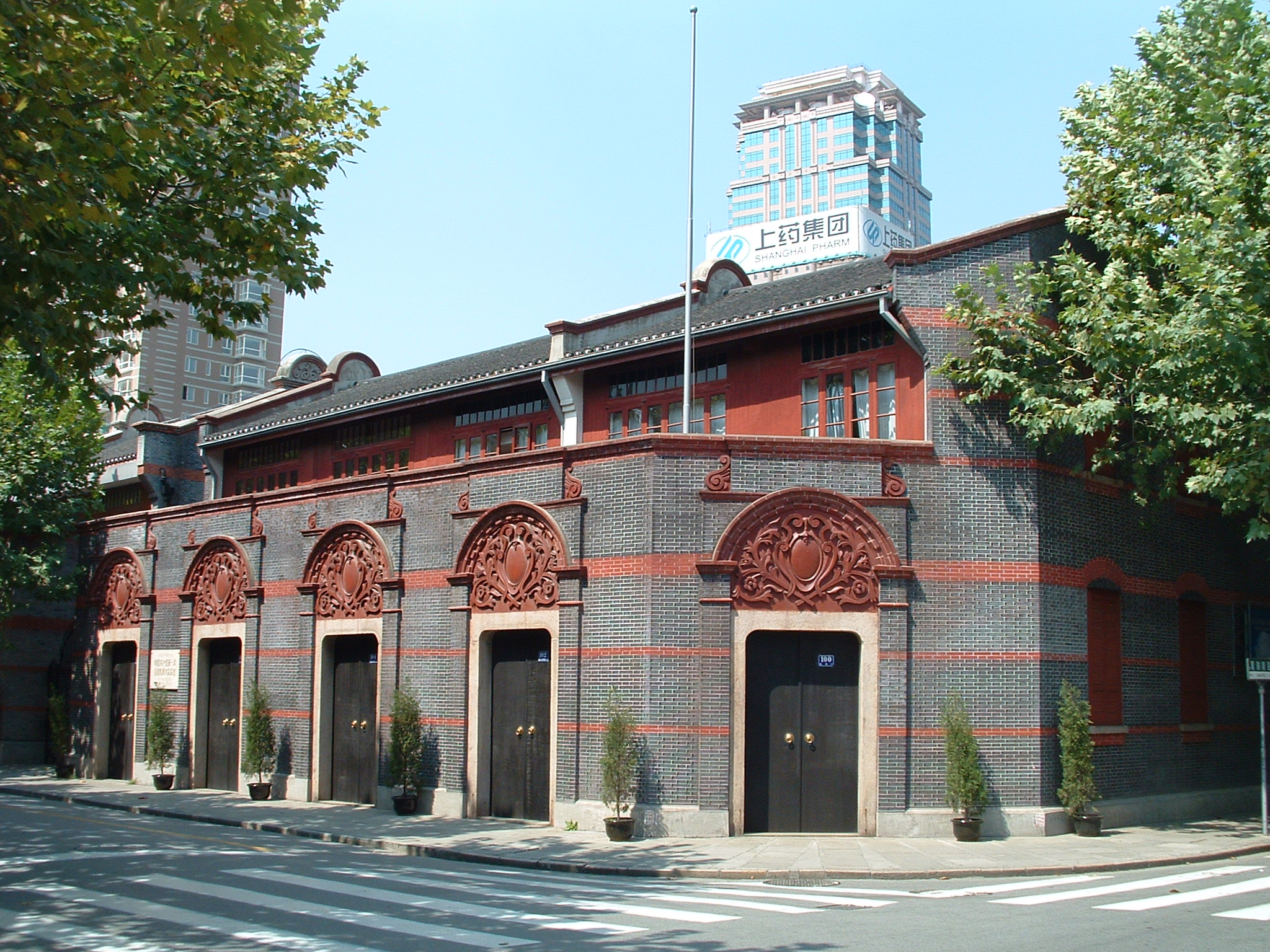
- Location: 76 Xingye Road, Huangpu District, Shanghai, China
- Coordinates: 31.2221°N 121.4707°E
- Public transit access: South Huangpi Road Station of the Shanghai Metro

The Site of the First National Congress of the Chinese Communist Party is now preserved as a museum in Shanghai, China. It is located in Xintiandi, on 76 Xingye Road (formerly 106 Rue Wantz, in the Shanghai French Concession). It is located in the historical shikumen buildings in which the 1st National Congress of the Chinese Communist Party took place during the month of July in 1921.

The museum combines exhibits about the history of China, the history of the city of Shanghai, and the events relevant to the founding of the Chinese Communist Party (CCP). It is a significant site for red tourism.

== History ==
At the time of the 1st National Congress of the Chinese Communist Party, the site was the residence of Li Hanjun, a founding member of the CCP. In 1950, Shanghai Museum cadre Shen Zhiyu was tasked with locating the site, with only the knowledge that it had been somewhere within the French Concession. Efforts to find the site were complicated by changes to the neighborhood in the years since the First National Congress.

When Shen located the site, it was a noodle shop named Hengfuchang Noodles. The Shanghai Municipal Committee of the Chinese Communist Party began renting the site in September 1951 while the multi-year authentication process continued. It bought the site in May 1952.

Efforts to replicate the site's interior arrangement at the time of the First National Congress continued until 1956, when they were finalized following Dong Biwu's site inspection and confirmation that the meeting took place in the downstairs portion of the site.

Plans for a large museum complex around the site were canceled following the financial difficulties of the Great Leap Forward. Preparations for this approach are among the contributors to the scope of the Xintiandi district in contemporary times.

In 1961, the site was designated as a national cultural relic under state protection, the most important of such designated sites in Shanghai.

The site closed to the public during 1966, 1967, and 1968 (the first years of the Cultural Revolution) and re-opened in 1969. Museum staff continued to be active during the period when the site was closed, including doing traveling exhibitions and collecting additional historical items. It also collected Cultural Revolution items, particularly ones associated with the January Storm. The museum's traveling exhibits brought historical items to locations including suburban factories and rural communes.

In 1980, the exhibits at the site were significantly revised to include additional CCP founders who had previously been excluded, such as Chen Duxiu. In September 2007, a photograph of Vladimir Neumann, one of two Communist International representatives present at the founding meeting of the CCP, was first displayed at the museum.

Museum staff focuses on implementing the most current trends in museology.

== Transportation ==
The museum is situated between two Shanghai Metro stations: South Huangpi Road (lines 1 and 14) to the north of the site, and Xintiandi (lines 10 and 13) to the south. On 20 June 2021, both stations were renamed after the museum.

== Gallery ==
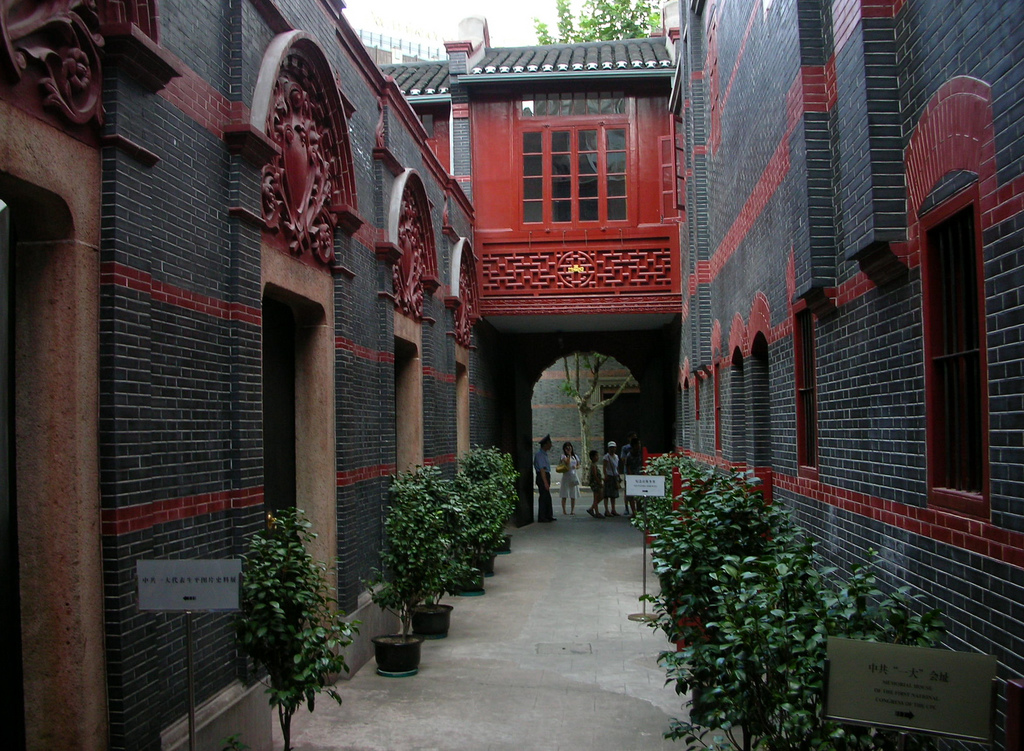
Inside alley of the site.

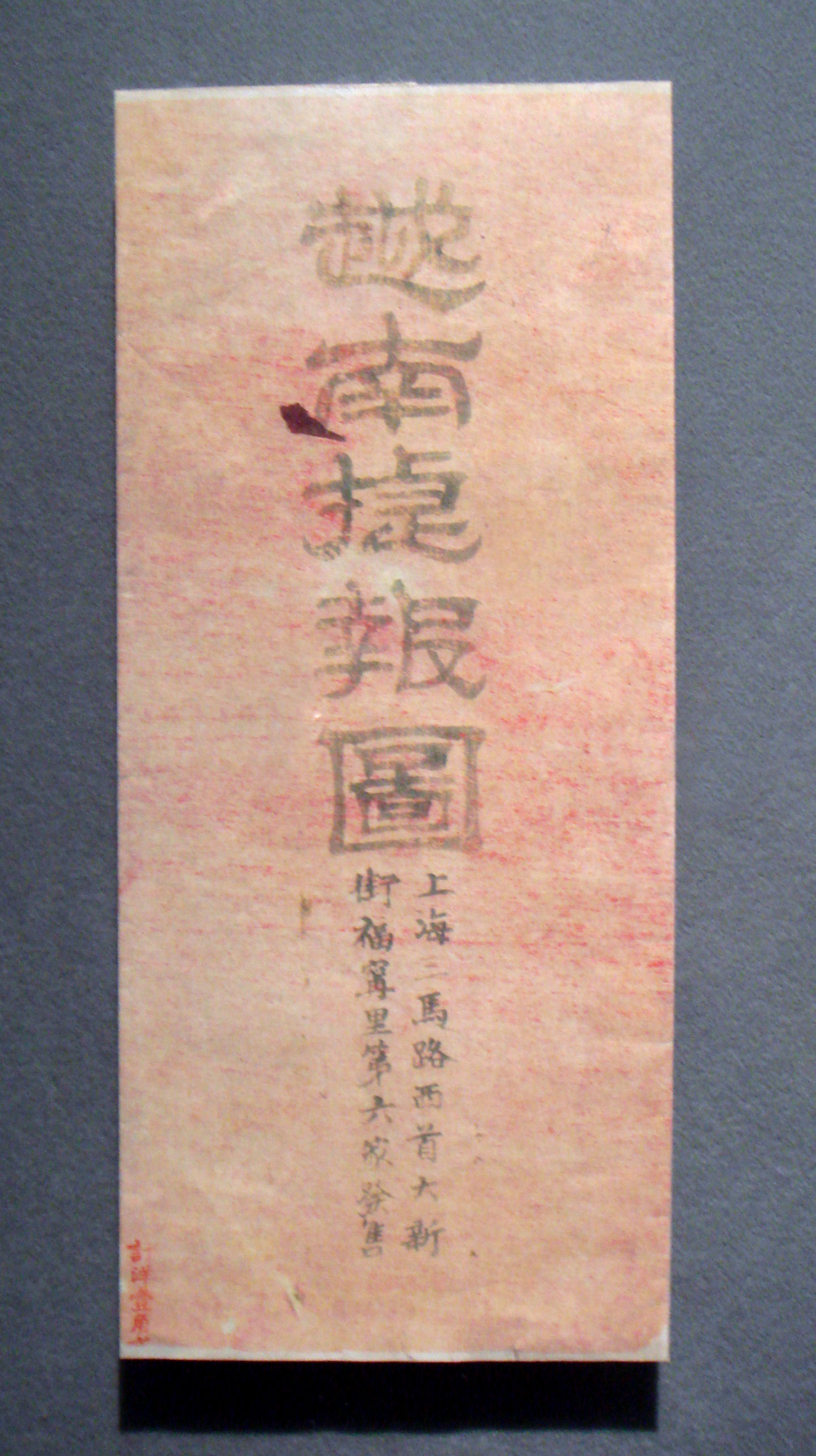
Chinese report on the Sino-French War, printed in Shanghai 1883–1885.

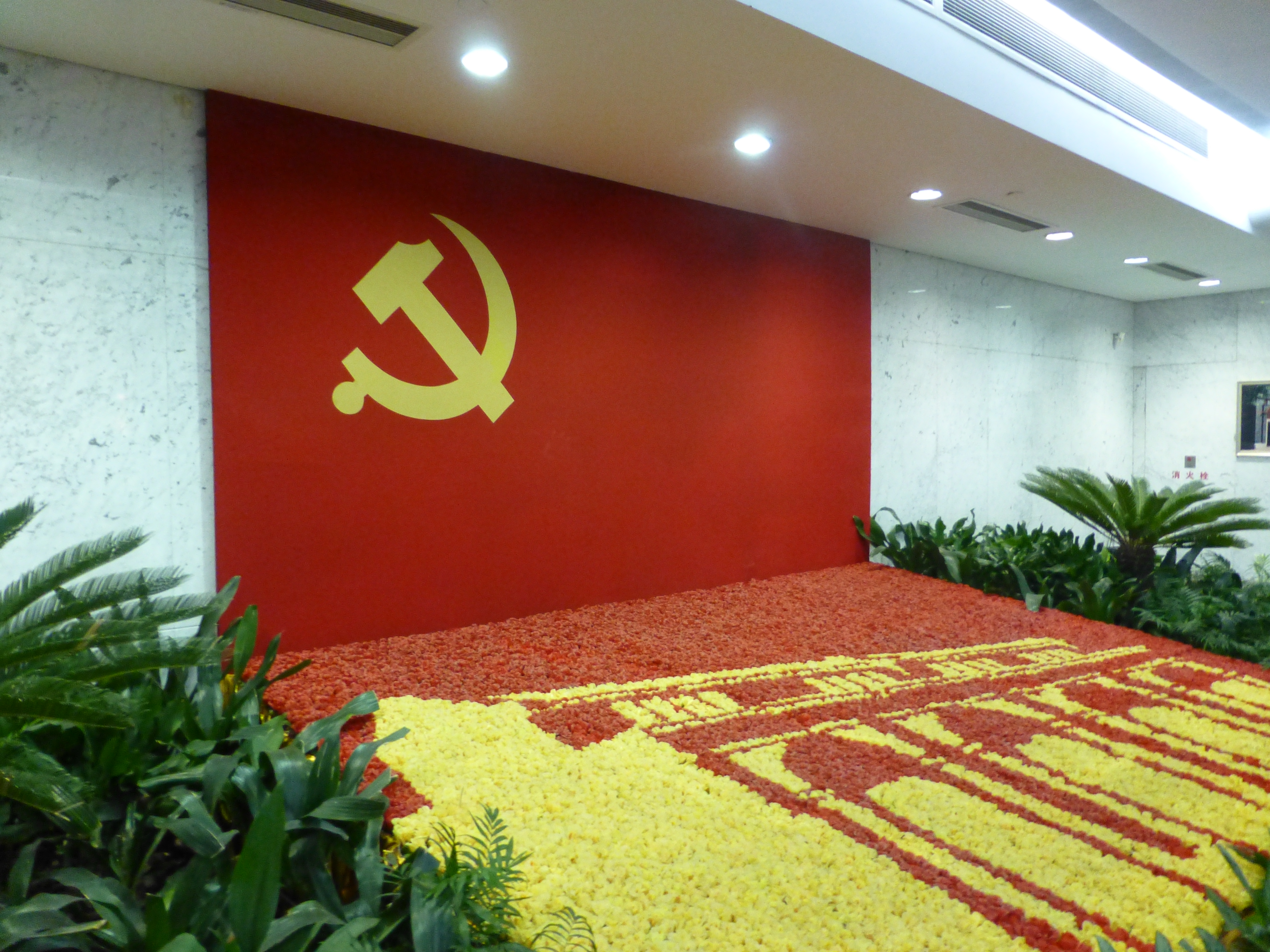
The entrance hall, with a party flag and floral arrangements.

== See also ==
- National Congress of the Chinese Communist Party
