= Great World =

Historic amusement arcade in Shanghai, China

Coordinates: 31.2302°N 121.4748°E

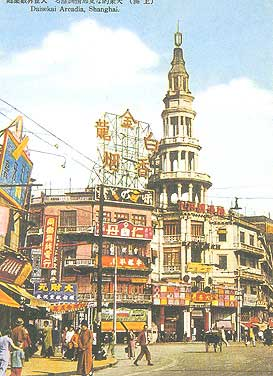
The Great World in its heyday in the 1930s.

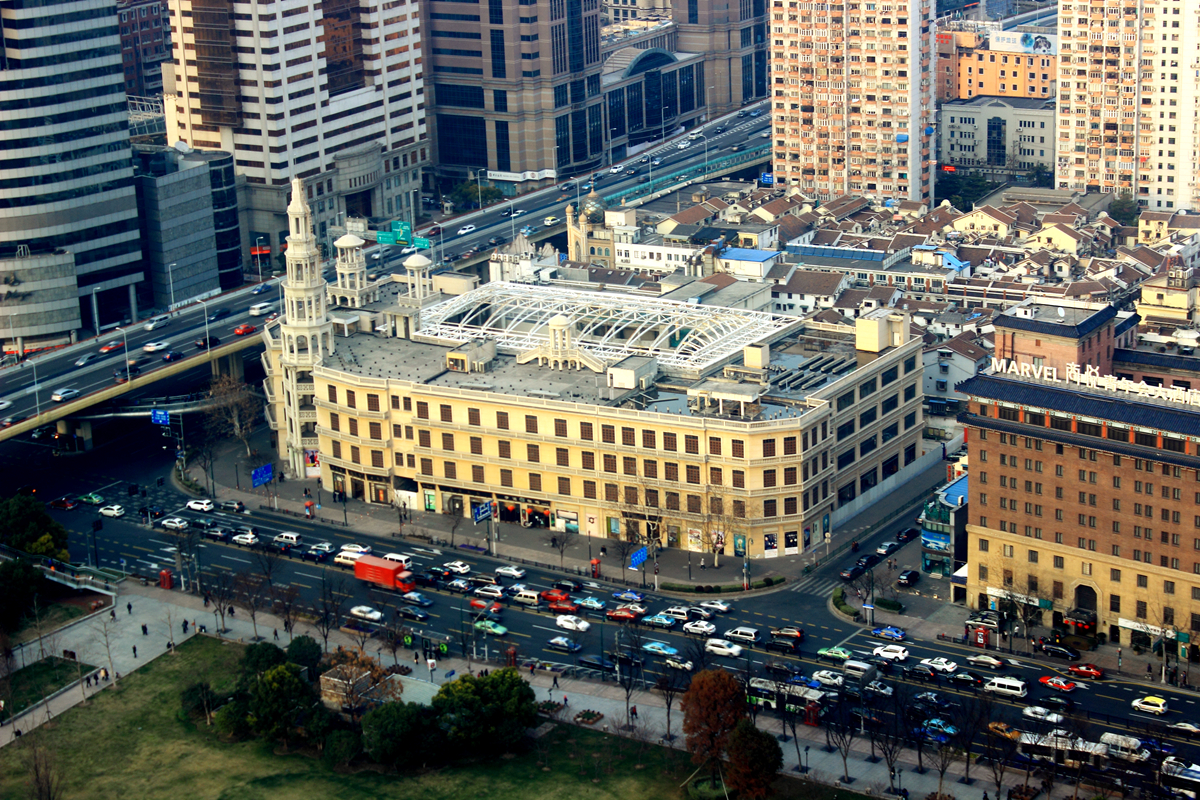
In 2014.

The Great World (Chinese: 大世界; pinyin: Dà Shìjìe; Shanghainese: Da Syga) is an amusement arcade and entertainment complex located in Shanghai, China. Built in 1917 on the corner of Avenue Edward VII (now Yan'an Road) and Yu Ya Ching Road (now Middle Xizang Road), it was the first and for a long time the most influential indoor amusement arcade in Shanghai, so much so that it spawned imitations all over China. It had gained a reputation as the "No. 1 Entertainment Venue in the Far East."

While the traditional style entertainment offered by the Great World today faces great competition from newer forms of entertainment and electronic media, it remains an important tourist attraction popular with visitors to Shanghai from other parts of China.

Such is the influence of Great World, that its Chinese name (Da Shijie) has become the name of a locality in its vicinity, "Dashijie". Dashijie Station, on Line 8 of the Shanghai Metro is located nearby and is named after Great World.

It was closed in 2003 due to an outbreak of the SARS epidemic, and the reopened at its centennial after repairs, in March 2017.

== History ==
The Great World opened on 14 July 1917, the brainchild of Shanghai magnate Huang Chujiu. It was built as an integrated entertainment complex featuring amusement arcades, parlour games, music hall shows, variety shows and traditional Chinese theatre. Great World was rebuilt in 1928 in an eclectic style borrowing largely from European Baroque, topped by a distinctive four-storey tower which quickly became a landmark. In 1931, Great World changed hands, bought out by another magnate, Huang Jinrong.

On 14 August 1937 it was the site of the Great World bombing, or "Black Saturday", and also the location of where the Imperial Japanese Navy flagship Izumo was berthed, in front of the area of the Shanghai International Settlement, the location of Great World. It was the second day of the Battle of Shanghai between the Republic of China and the Empire of Japan and the beginning of what historians Evgenia Vlasova and Lianggang Sun refer to as "the beginning of full-scale World War II combat operations". Great World had thrown open its doors for refugees fleeing the fighting in the Chinese and Japanese zones of the city for the relative safety of the Shanghai International Settlement. Two bombs from a damaged Republic of China Air Force bomber were accidentally released and exploded in front of Great World. The pilot, fearing the plane would crash, had intended to release the bombs into the large uninhabited space of the nearby Shanghai Race Course, but the bombs were released too early. About two thousand people, made up of shoppers, passers-by, Chinese and foreigners, and refugees who were standing outside Great World, were killed or injured. However, it's believed that the errant bombs were meant for the Japanese warship Izumo that was berthed right next to the International Settlement, using the densely populated area as a human shield, and there is also speculation that the International Settlement was deliberately bombed by orders given to the "errant" pilot as a means to draw the foreign powers to join the war; Europeans did not join the war until the German invasion of Poland and the Americans rejected joining the war until the attack on Pearl Harbor.

After the Communist takeover of Shanghai in 1949, Great World was renamed "People's Amusement Arcade", but reverted to the old name in 1958. Closed during the Cultural Revolution, in 1974 the site became the "Shanghai Youth Palace". On 25 January 1981, Great World was re-established, and renamed "Great World Entertainment Centre".

Great World was closed following the SARS epidemic in 2003. It was reopened in March 2017.

The basic layout of the complex has remained the same since the 1928 rebuilding. While the entertainment options have been updated over the years (with motion pictures early on and karaoke more recently, for example), some elements remain the same. One legendary feature is the series of distorting mirrors near the entrance, which have provided simple entertainment to visitors for more than a century.

== Description ==
In its heyday, Great World's main attractions were vaudeville, various regional forms of traditional Chinese opera, and Chinese folk art forms. It was also famous for the twelve distorting "magic mirrors" imported from the Netherlands in the lobby area.

Writing of his visit in the mid-1930s, Hollywood film director Josef von Sternberg described, "On the first floor were gaming tables, singsong girls, magicians, pick-pockets, slot machines, fireworks, birdcages, fans, stick incense, acrobats, and ginger. One flight up were… actors, crickets and cages, pimps, midwives, barbers, and earwax extractors. The third floor had jugglers, herb medicines, ice cream parlors, a new bevy of girls, their high collared gowns slit to reveal their hips, and (as a) novelty, several rows of exposed (Western) toilets. The fourth floor had shooting galleries, fan-tan tables, … massage benches, … dried fish and intestines, and dance platforms. The fifth floor featured girls with dresses slit to the armpits, a stuffed whale, storytellers, balloons, peep shows, masks, a mirror maze, two love letter booths with scribes who guaranteed results, rubber goods, and a temple filled with ferocious gods and joss sticks. On the top floor and roof of that house of multiple joys a jumble of tightrope walkers slithered back and forth, and there were seesaws, Chinese checkers, mahjong, … firecrackers, lottery tickets, and marriage brokers."

Now there is theater, music hall, Guinness World Records competition hall, movie hall, video hall, magic world, dancing hall, KTV, tea house and ski field and so on. There is also the new Shanghai flavor snack corridor, restaurant and boutique market and so on. The Shanghai Great World is a playing center with entertainment, performance, viewing, food and sports and so on.

== Architecture ==
The Great World consists of three four-storey buildings and two annexe buildings. The building was built in a simple Vernacular Style, except a tall, Baroque-inspired spire in the centre, which is supported by grand order columns extending to the first floor.

== Transportation ==
Address: 1 Xizang Road, Shanghai

- Shanghai Metro:
  - Dashijie Station: Lines 8 and 14
  - People's Square Station: Lines 1, 2 and 8
- Shanghai Buses: routes 127, 71, 48, 49, 01, 17, 18, 23, 980 etc.
