= Xintiandi =

Affluent district of Shanghai, China

Coordinates: 31.22260°N 121.47010°E

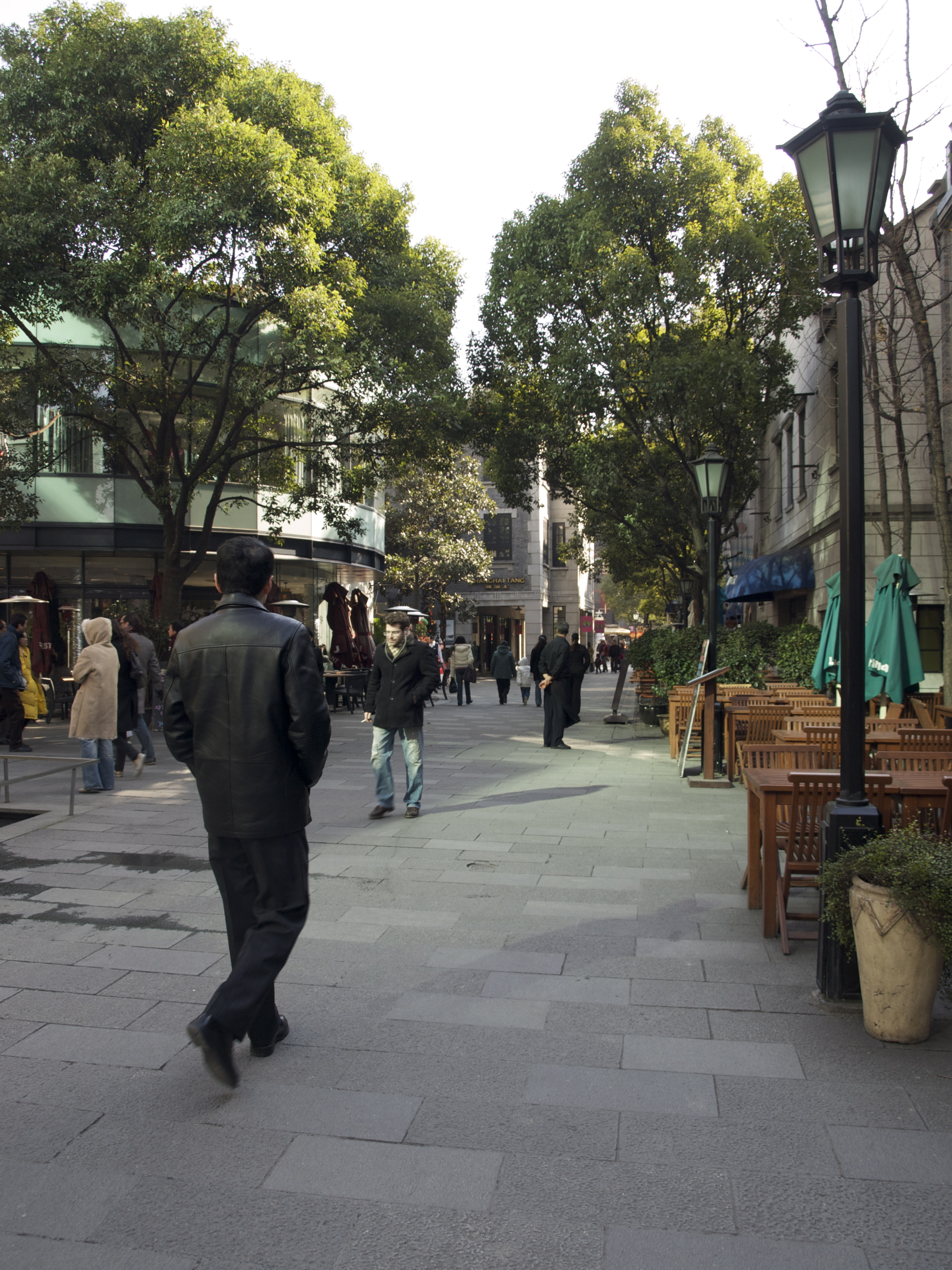
View of Xintiandi.

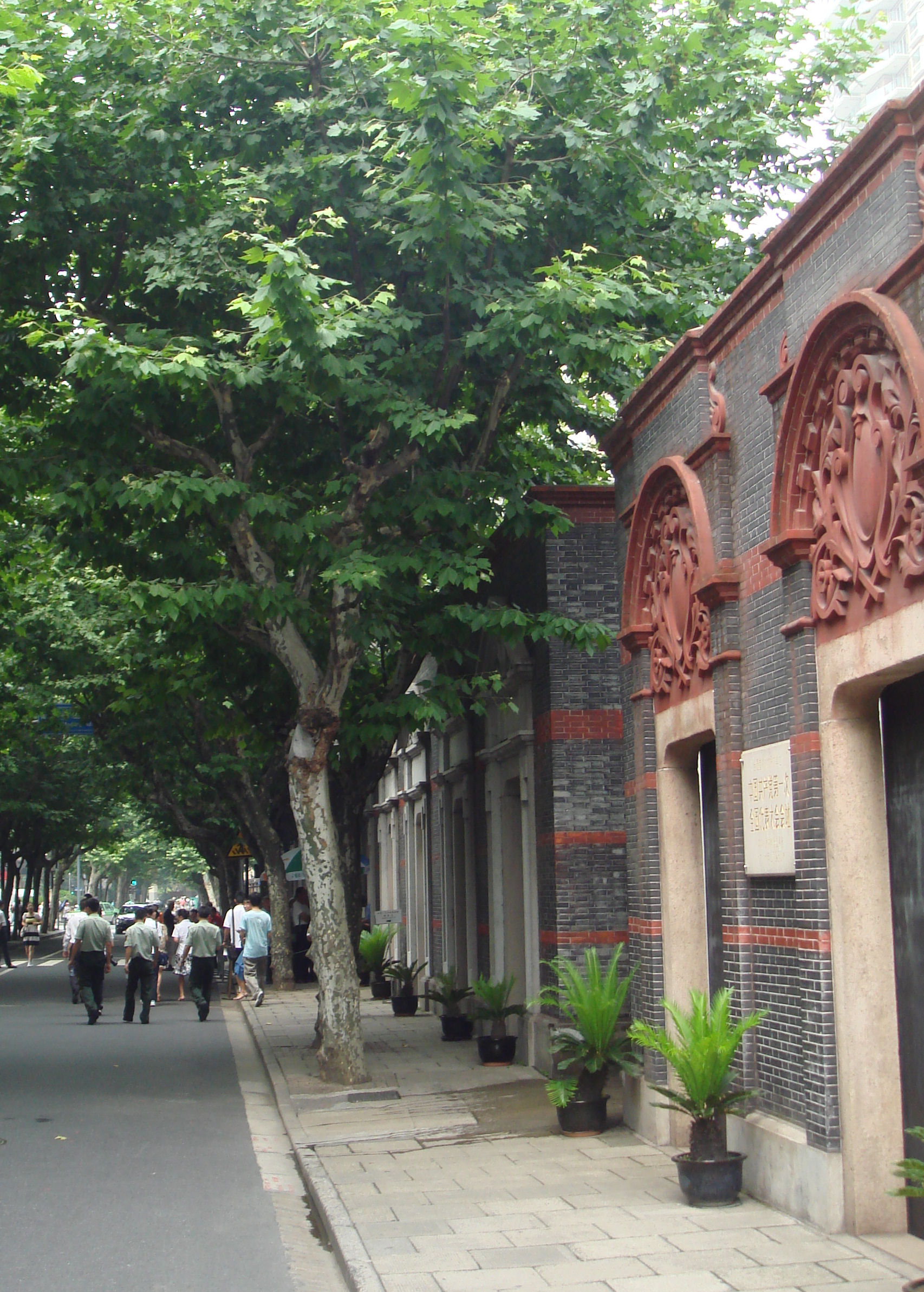
Location of the first Congress of the Chinese Communist Party in July 1921, Xintiandi.

Xintiandi (Chinese: 新天地; pinyin: Xīntiāndì, Shanghainese: Shinthidi lit. "New Sky and Earth", fig. "New World") is an affluent car-free shopping, eating and entertainment district of Shanghai. Xintiandi now refers to the wider area centered around Madang Road which includes both pedestrian-only and motor traffic roads.

== Overview ==
The district is composed of an area of reconstituted traditional mid-19th century shikumen ("stone gate") houses on narrow alleys, some adjoining houses which now serve as book stores, cafes and restaurants, and shopping malls. Most of the cafes and restaurants feature both indoor and outdoor seating. Xintiandi has an active nightlife on weekdays as well as weekends, though romantic settings are more common than loud music and dance places. It is considered one of the first lifestyle centers in China. It is also the most expensive place to live in China, with some apartments costing more than Tokyo, Singapore, New York and London. It is generally home to the Chinese elites and top executive expats or immigrants. The slogan of the area is "Let tomorrow meet yesterday at today in Shanghai".

Xintiandi is the location of the site of the first congress of the Chinese Communist Party, which is now preserved at the Museum of the First National Congress of the Chinese Communist Party. Also nearby are the Shikumen Open House Museum and the site of the Provisional Government of the Republic of Korea.

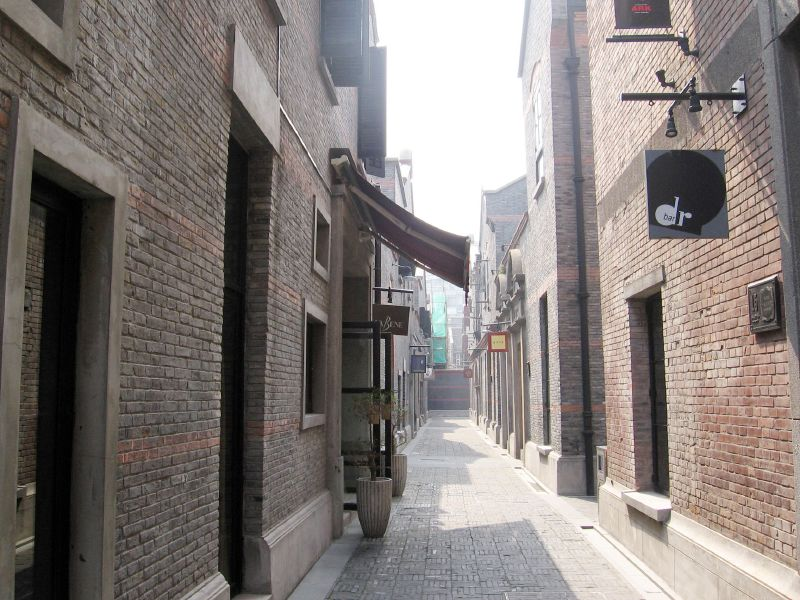
Renovated shikumen lane in Xintiandi.

== Redevelopment ==
In 1996, Shui On Group acquired 23 square blocks in the former French Concession area of Shanghai. This was part of a larger redevelopment project at southern Taipingqiao Road. At the time of its redevelopment, the government could not itself fund the work and the 1997 Asian Financial Crisis had weakened the real estate market overfall.

Shui On's redevelopment of the area required it to meet strict historical preservation requirements. Height requirements were a particular challenge for redevelopment, as required by the historic terraced buildings, including the site of the 1st National Congress of the Chinese Communist Party. The historical preservation requirements meant that redevelopment came at a high cost; Shui On offset these costs through its development of modern buildings adjacent to the historic core of Xintiandi.

Among other redevelopment approaches seeking to preserve the historical character of the area, the internal spaces of various houses were merged to create a larger space for restaurants, bars, nightclubs, and shops. Many tour groups both domestic and from abroad also visit Xintiandi as one of the main attractions in Shanghai.

The Xintiandi redevelopment was also collaborated with global architecture firm Skidmore, Owings & Merrill, including with Benjamin T. Wood and Nikken Sekkei International. The urban renewal is considered one of the first examples of the placemaking approach in China. It was a success both from a real estate business perspective and as a cultural phenomenon. According to academics Fulong Wu and Fangzhu Zhang, this was also an instance of private development being utilised to meet the political and governmental needs to the state.

Redevelopment was completed in 2001. The previously neglected area became a hub of activity and influenced the development of other attempts to revitalise other older neighborhoods around the country.

== Transportation ==
The closest Shanghai Metro stations in the vicinity are South Huangpi Road Station (on Line 1), Site of the First CPC National Congress · Xintiandi station (on Line 10 and Line 13) and Madang Road Station (on Line 9 and Line 13).

== See also ==
- Tianzifang
- 50 Moganshan Road
- Lee Tung Street
