= Hong Kong Resort International Limited =

Hong Kong Resort International Limited may refer to:

- HKR International or HKR International Limited, a Hong Kong-listed company
- Hong Kong Resort Company or Hong Kong Resort Company Limited, a joint venture between HKR International Ltd and CITIC Pacific
