= Cha House =

- 查公館
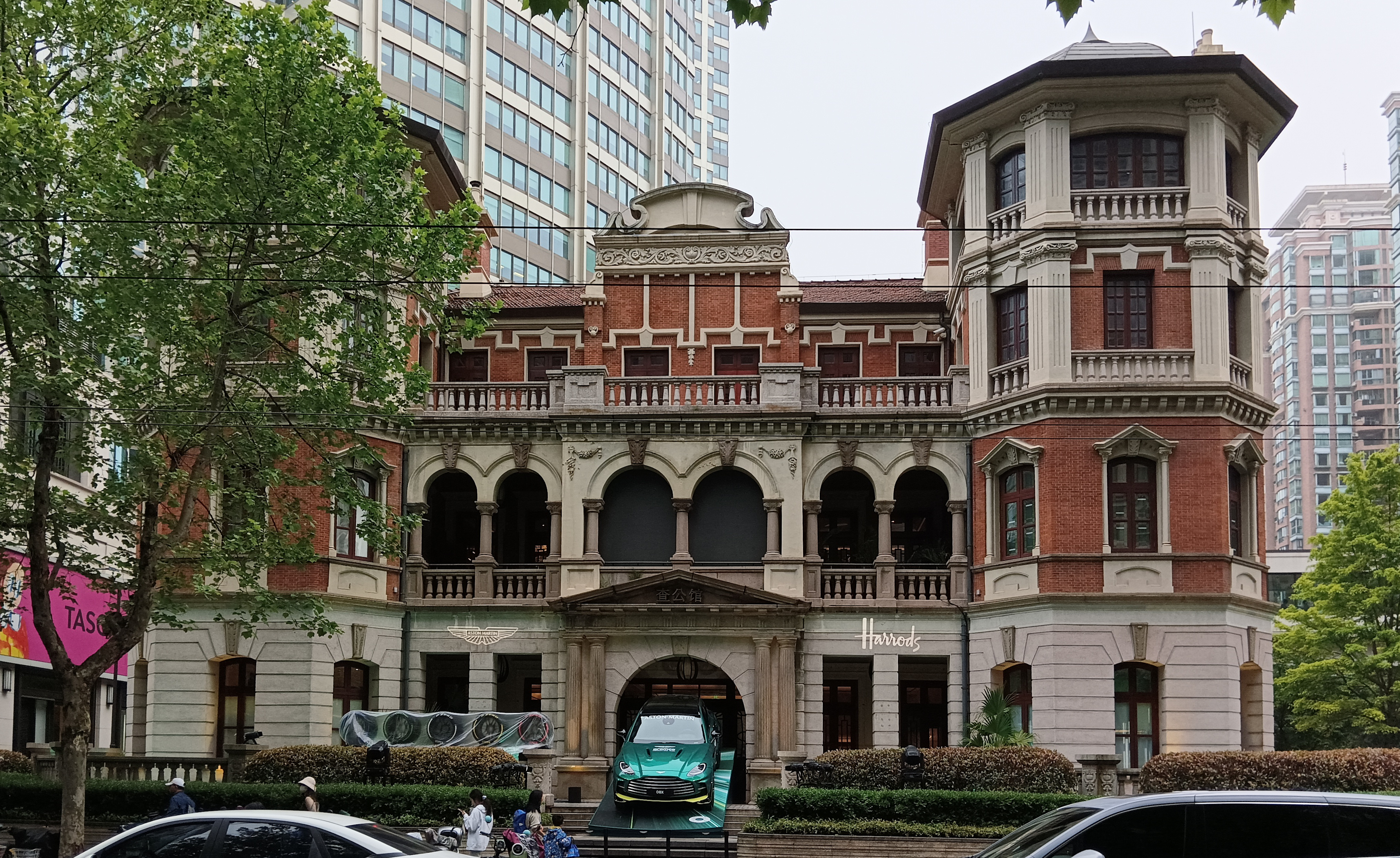
- Interactive map of the Cha House area
- Former names: The Qius' residence (1920–1940); Minli Middle School Block 4 (1940–2008)

General information
- Type: Business
- Architectural style: Baroque architecture with Jiangnan features
- Coordinates: 31.23°N 121.46°E
- Construction started: 1913

Technical details
- Floor area: 1777 square metres

Design and construction
- Awards and prizes: Outstanding Historical Buildings (1999)

Cha House is a building in Shanghai, People's Republic of China. The building was constructed in 1920 and was owned and used by two brothers, Qiu Xinshan and Qiu Weiqing, who were businessmen in the dye industry at that time. The Qius' residence originally comprised two blocks, the East Block and West Block. The West Block was demolished for the reconstruction of Minli Middle School, while the East Block was used as the office building of the school. In 2002, HKR International (HKRI) acquired the land-use right of Dazhongli, on which the building was located. Afterwards, the building was moved from its previous location to the current one and now forms part of the HKRI Taikoo Hui.

== History ==
=== The Qius' residence (1920–1940) ===
Cha House was built by two brothers, Qiu Xinshan and Qiu Weiqing, who were engaged in the dye industry, in the 1920s. The Qius' residence originally comprised two blocks (East Block and West Block) and each of the blocks was used by one of the brothers and his family members.

=== Minli Middle School (1940–2002) ===
After the outbreak of WWII, the campus of Minli Middle School in Shanghai was destroyed and the temporary school building located in the Shanghai International Settlement was out of capacity. Therefore, Minli Middle School rented the Qiu’s Residence as one of the school buildings. After the war, the building was commandeered by the Nationalist government as “New Life Club” for a short period of time. Later, the West Block was demolished and the East Block continued to be used by Minli Middle School and was named “Outstanding Historical Building” in 1999.

=== Reconstruction (2002–2017) ===
In 2002, HKRI acquired the Dazhongli site with a consideration of RMB 1.3 billion and planned to redevelop the land into a commercial complex. However, the location of Minli Middle School within the site made it impossible to build and excavate for foundation. Evaluation by a team of specialists concluded that the building needed to be moved horizontally to a new site.

On 26 January 2010, the building glued to the base was pushed by hydraulic jacks towards its new position at the southern end of the site near Weihai Road along the paved tracks at a speed of two centimeters per minute. The moving of the building over a distance of 57 metres took two weeks and the building reached its final position on 7 February where it was fixed onto a new foundation.

Upon its successful relocation and after further restoration, the historic building is ready to be reopened.

=== Cha House (2017–present) ===
The building has been renamed as Cha House, in memory of Cha Chi Ming, the founder of HKRI.
