= Nanjing Road =

Road in Shanghai, China

Coordinates: 31°14′05″N 121°28′28″E

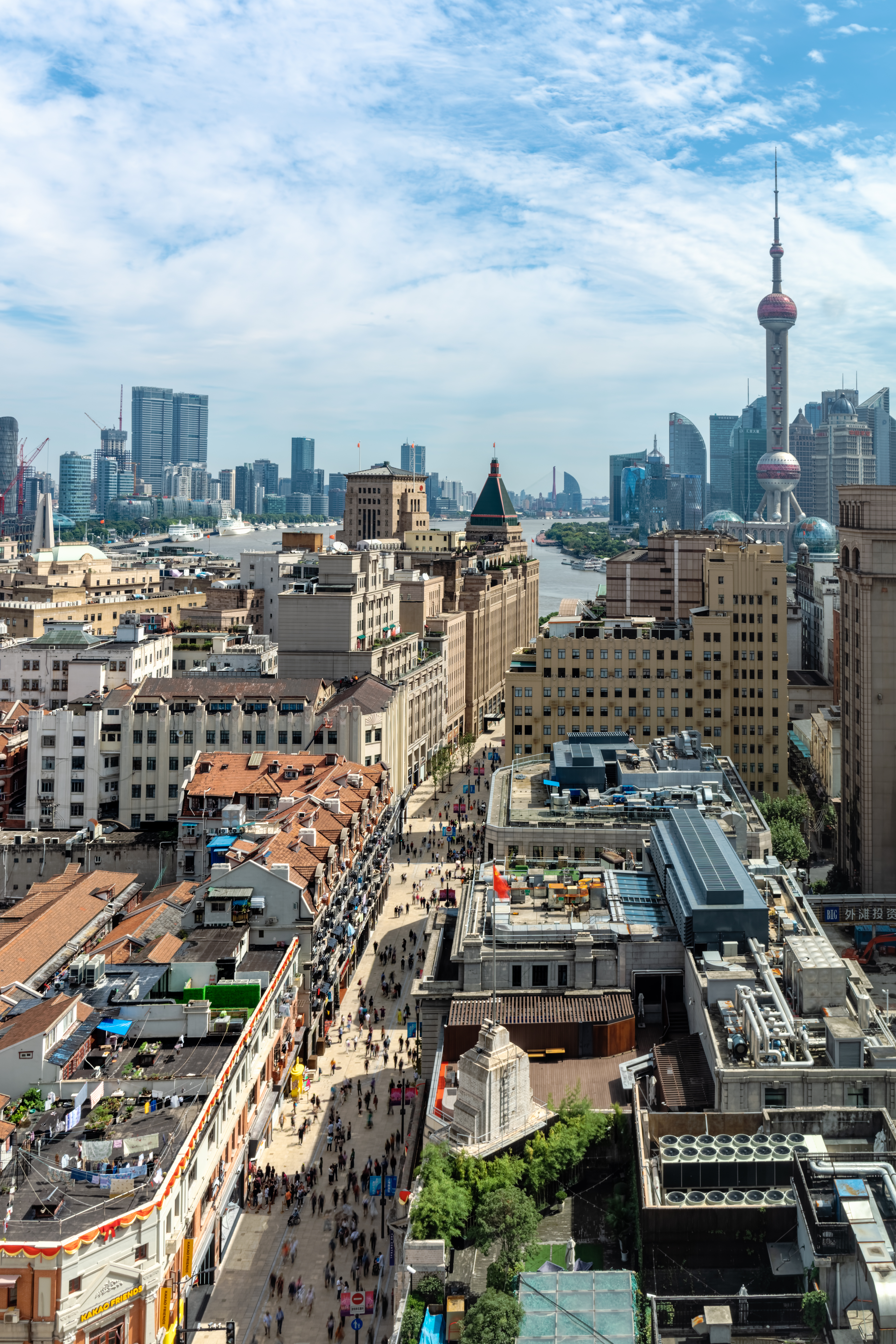
East Nanjing Road in 2020

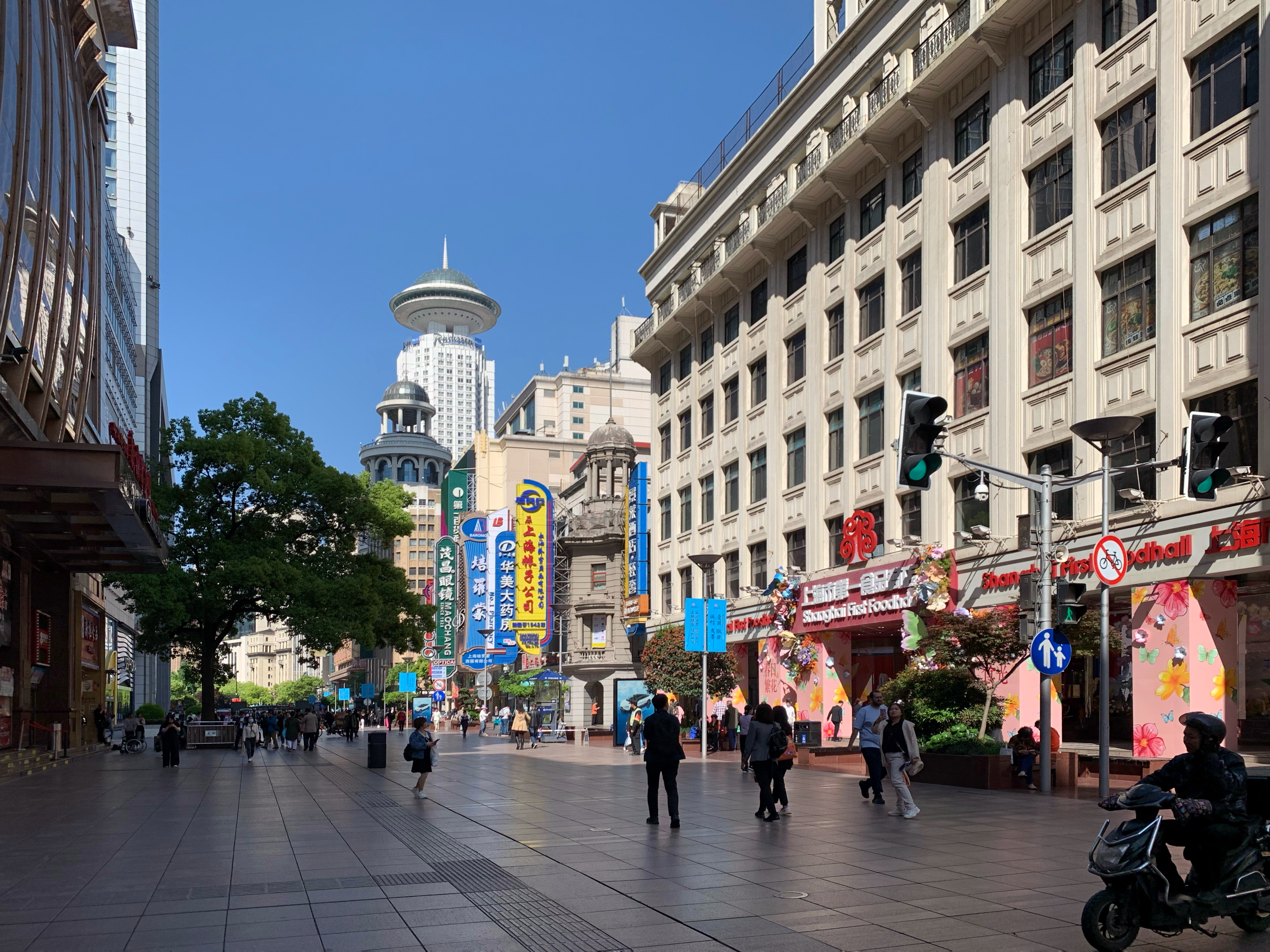
East Nanjing Road in 2024

Map

Nanjing Road (Chinese: 南京路; pinyin: Nánjīng Lù; Shanghainese: Noecin Lu) is a road in Shanghai, the eastern part of which is the main shopping district of Shanghai. It is one of the world's busiest shopping streets, along with Fifth Avenue, Oxford Street, Orchard Road, Takeshita Street and the Champs-Élysées. The street is named after Nanjing, capital of Jiangsu province and the former capital of the Republic of China. Today's Nanjing Road comprises two sections, Nanjing Road East and Nanjing Road West.

In some contexts, "Nanjing Road" refers only to what was pre-1945 Nanjing Road, then rendered as Nanking Road in English. The former Nanking Road lay entirely within the Shanghai International Settlement. Today's Nanjing Road West was formerly Bubbling Well Road, an extra-settlement road built by concession authorities outside the concession proper. The two roads met on the northern edge of the Shanghai Race Club.

== Location ==
Nanjing Road is located in the city center, running in a west–east direction. Its eastern section is in Huangpu District and extends from The Bund west to People's Square. The western section begins at People's Square and continues westward towards Jing'an District.

== History ==
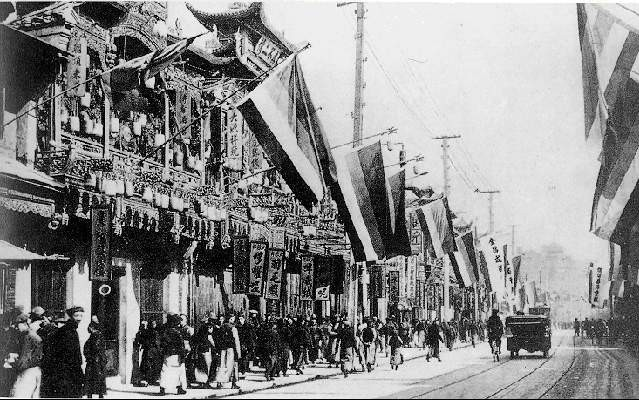
Nanjing Road after the 1911 Chinese Revolution full of the Five Races Under One Union Flags then used by the revolutionaries

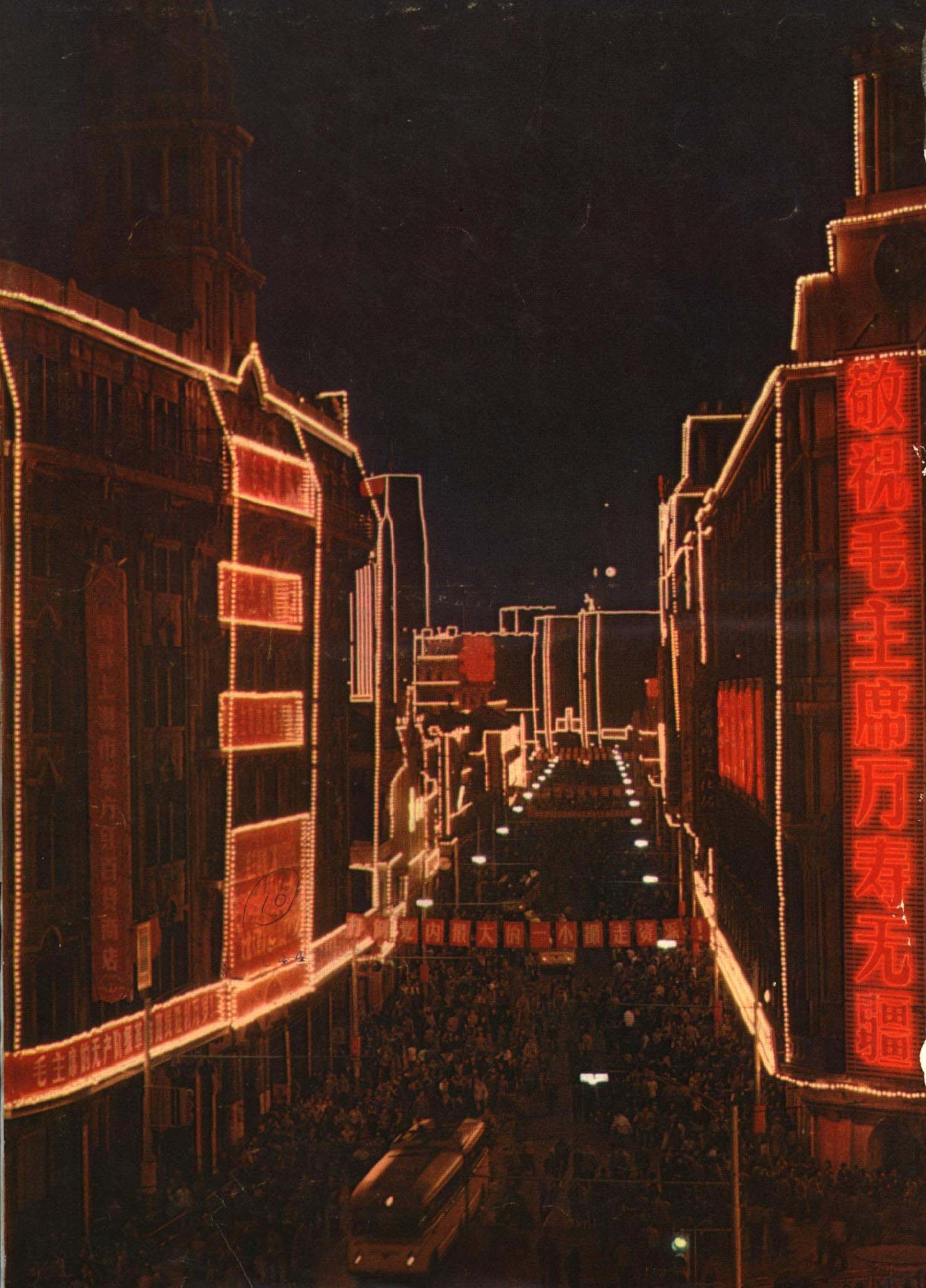
Nanjing Road in 1967 during the Cultural Revolution

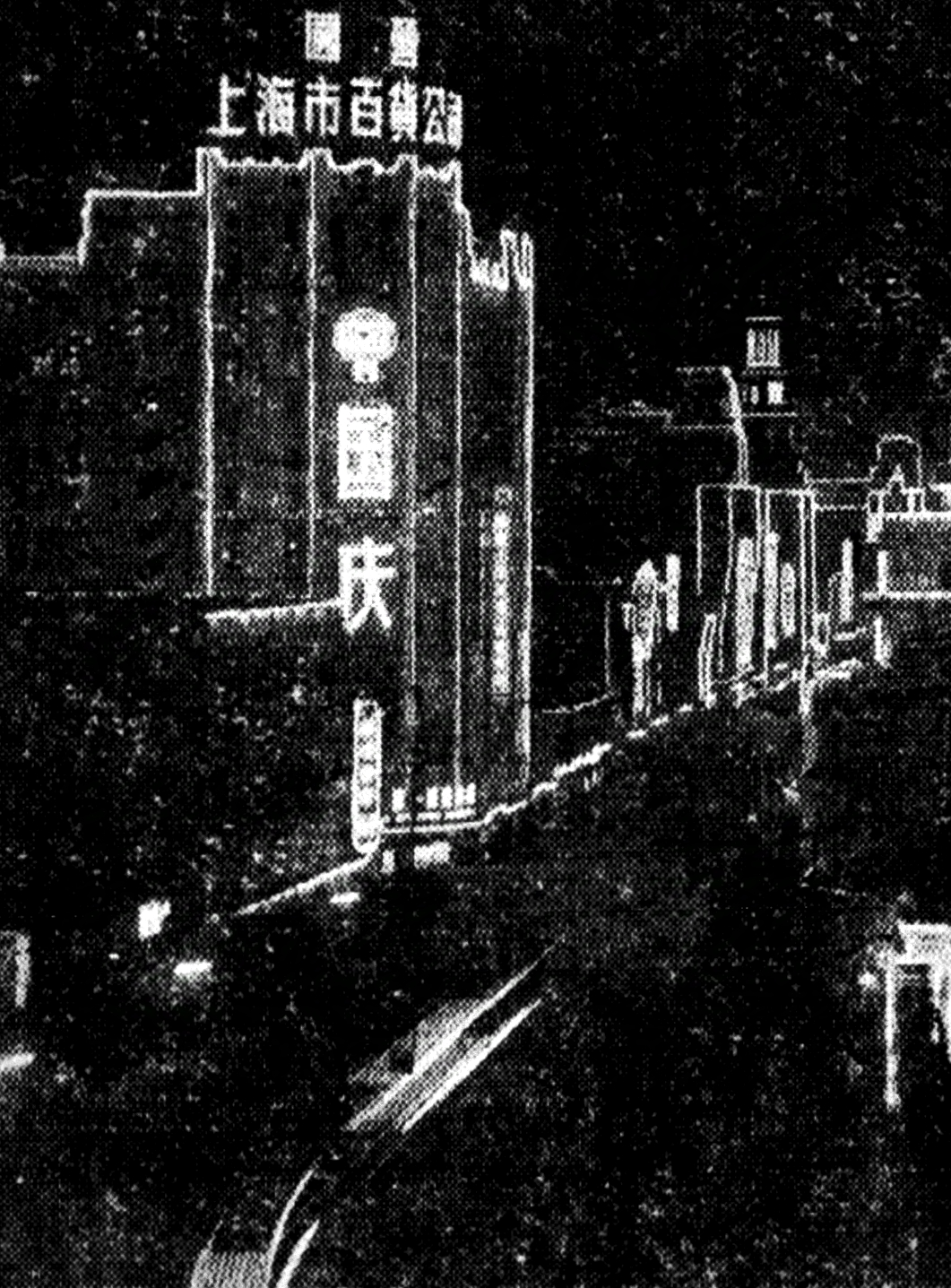
Nanjing Road during the 20th anniversary of People's Republic of China (1969)

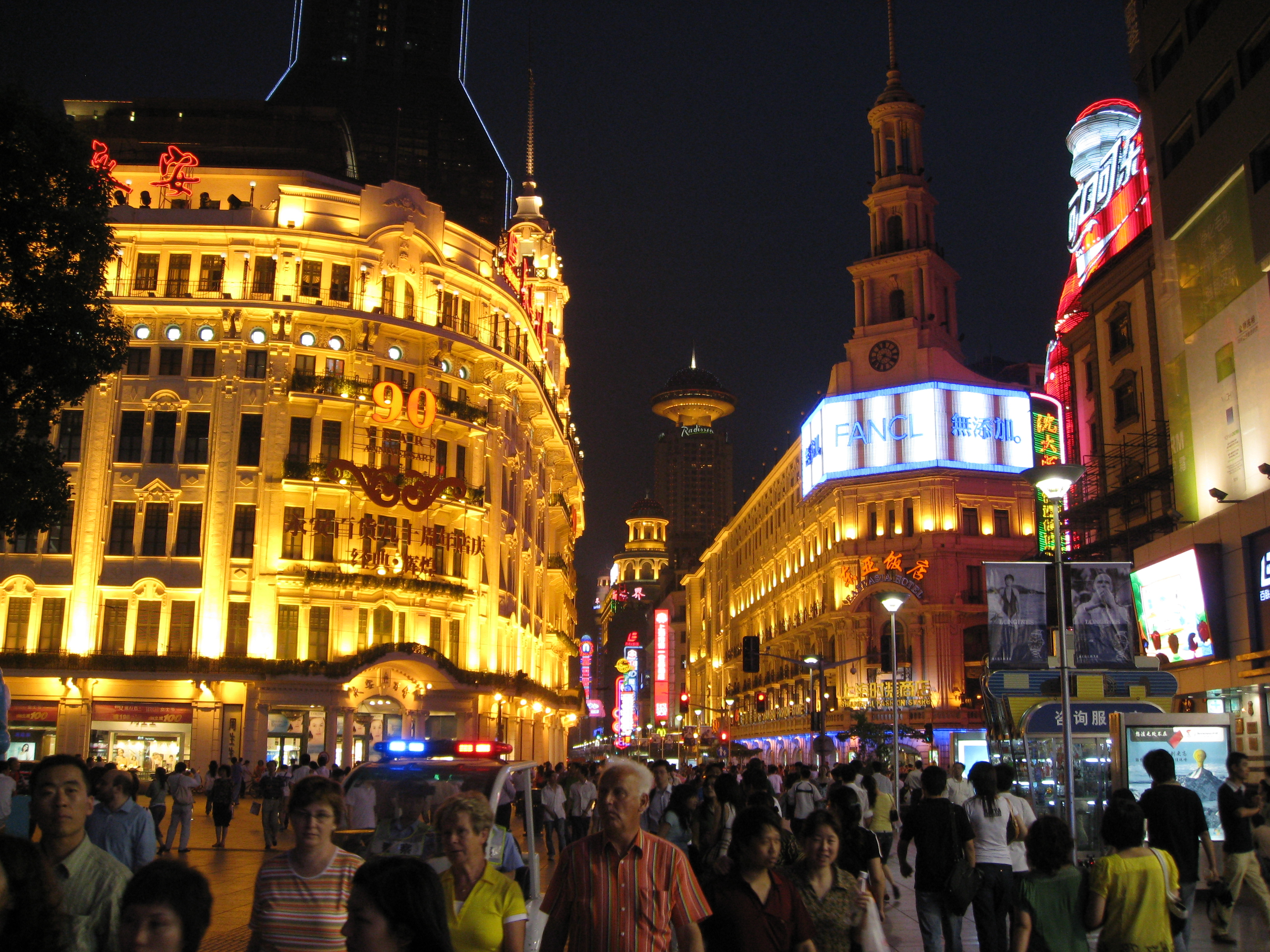
Nanjing Road at night

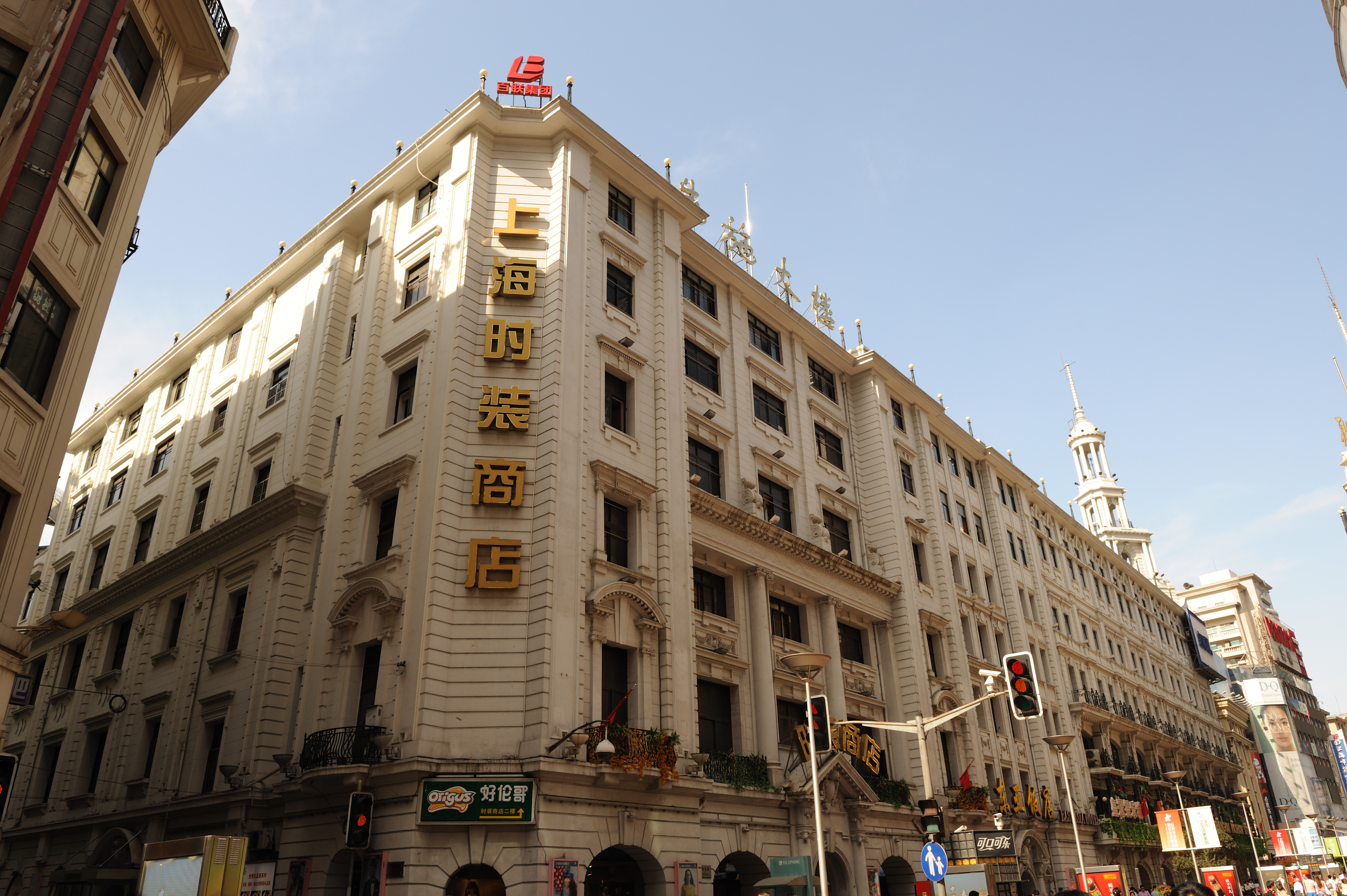
Shanghai Fashion Store

The history of Nanjing Road can be traced back to the year 1845. At that time it was called "Park Lane", which stretched from the Bund to He'nan Road. In 1854, it was extended to Zhejiang Road, and eight years later, once more extended to Xizang Road. In 1862, it was named formally "Nanking Road" by the Municipal Council, which administered the International Settlement. In Chinese it was usually referred to as the Main Road (大马路). Around 1930 it was a bustling street with at least one reported casino (probably at nr. 181). In 1943 the International Settlement was annulled, and after World War II the government changed its name from Nanking Road to "East Nanjing Road", meanwhile they also renamed the former Bubbling Well Road "West Nanjing Road", and the general name of the two roads became "Nanjing Road", comprising five kilometres total length.

At the beginning of the 20th century, eight big department stores were established along the street. A series of franchised stores were also set up at that time.

On 14 August 1937, a Chinese warplane attempting to bomb the Japanese ship Izumo missed its target, dropping four bombs onto the crowded nearby streets, two of which landed on Nanjing Road. Around 2,000 people were killed by the four bombs collectively.

In 2000, as a part of the development plan held by the local government, Nanjing Road was renovated to be a characteristic pedestrian street. The width is about 28 meters and the total length is 1,200 meters, which extends from Middle He'nan Road to Middle Xizang Road.

In 2007, the Jing'an and Huangpu governments agreed to coordinate their policy to enhance the development of Nanjing Road, through a unique launching of a committee. This agreement followed a request by the committee of Champs-Elysees in the perspective of a friendship agreement between both famous streets.

In 2019–2020, the section between Middle Henan Road and the Bund (East-1 Zhongshan Road) was converted into a pedestrian-only zone, extending the pedestrian mall eastward to the Bund.

== Description ==
Nanjing Road is the world's longest shopping district, around 5.5 km long, and attracts over 1 million visitors daily.

=== Nanjing Road East (南京东路) ===
East Nanjing Road is a dedicated commercial zone. At its eastern end is the central section of the Bund, featuring the Peace Hotel. Immediately west of the Bund precinct was traditionally the hub of European-style restaurants and cafes, although in recent years these have become less of a feature as the demographics of visitors to Nanjing Road have shifted from affluent local residents to visitors from around the country. Close by is the Central Market, a century-old outdoor market today specialising in electronic components and digital media. Further west is the Nanjing Road pedestrian mall. Located here are most of Shanghai's oldest and largest department stores, as well as a variety of domestic retail outlets, and some traditional eateries with a long history. From the perspective of the historical development of Nanjing East Road, the start and redevelopment of this road were driven by the pursuit of commerce and image. The commercialization of Nanjing East Road has both a promotion and a restrictive effect.

=== Nanjing Road West (南京西路) ===
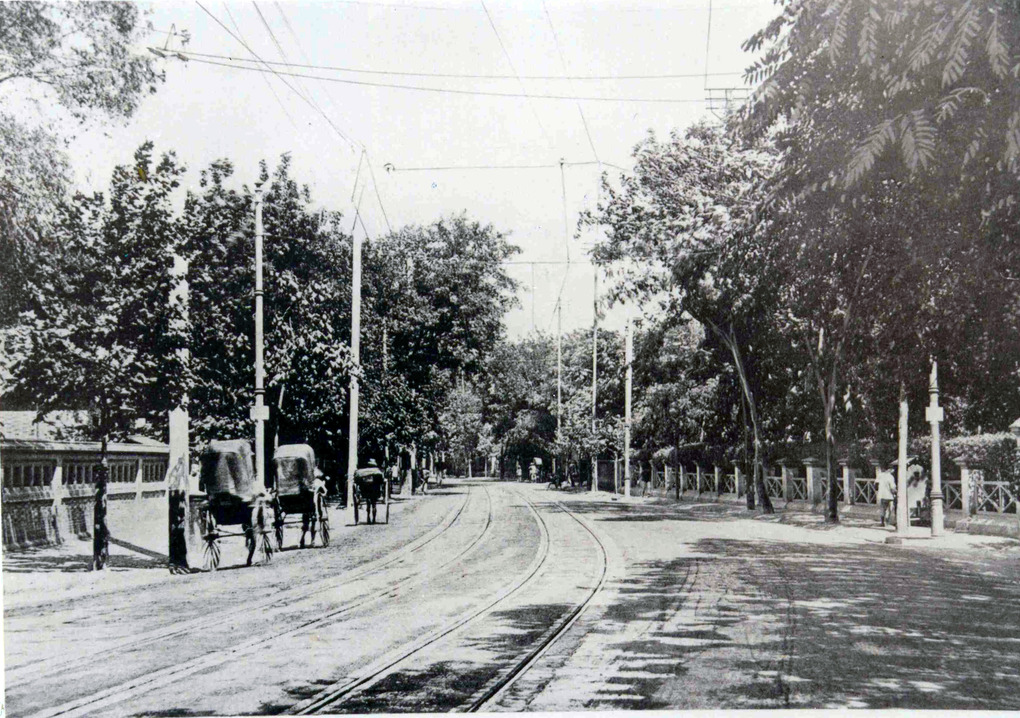
Bubbling Well Road was one of the first extra-settlement roads.

The pedestrian mall, and East Nanjing Road, ends at People's Park, formerly the Shanghai Race Course. Opposite the park are some of Shanghai's prestigious historic hotels, including Park Hotel. West Nanjing Road begins here, and features a number of upmarket malls including Plaza 66, Jing An Kerry Centre and HKRI Taikoo Hui, office buildings such as Tian An Centre, the Shanghai Exhibition Centre, and shops. This area also previously featured a number of large mansions and estates, most of which are today either demolished or used by the government.

West Nanjing Road, near Jing'an Temple, was built in 1860 as Bubbling Well Road (靜安寺路), an extra-settlement road outside the concession proper. It was once one of Shanghai's premier residential areas, but has witnessed constant development over the past ten years. This area is now host to several five star hotels, upscale shopping centers, restaurants and prime office buildings. Recently, the area has benefited from the construction of Subway Line 7, connecting with Line 2 at Jing'an Temple station. Many luxury goods, fashion and sport brand boutiques are located on West Nanjing Road.

In December 2017, Starbucks opened a 30,000 square feet (2,800 m2) Starbucks Reserve Roastery at HKRI Taikoo Hui on Nanjing Road West, the largest Starbucks branch in the world. It features its own roasting facility and Shanghai specific offerings including nitro draft lattes and alcoholic drinks.

== Transportation ==
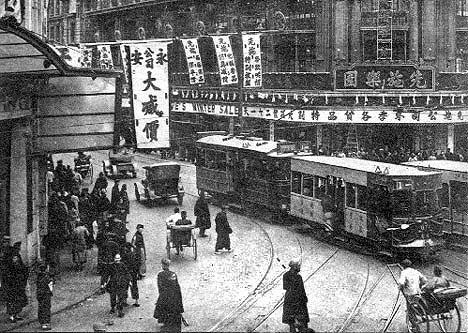
A tram passes through one of the busiest sections of Nanjing Road (between the Sincere and Wing On Companies) in the 1920s.

Shanghai Metro Line 2 runs along Nanjing Road, including the following stations and other stations:

- Nanjing Road (E.) (E. Nanjing Rd / M. Henan Rd.) (formerly Henan Zhong Road), At the intersection between East Nanjing Road and Middle Henan Road.
- People's Square (Nanjing Rd. / M. Tibet Rd.), the metro station on People's Square in the middle of Nanjing Road. Across the M. Tibet Road from this station is the west end of the pedestrianized part of the road. The Nanjing Rd / M. Tibet Road. crossing is the split point of E. and W. Nanjing Rd.
- Nanjing Road (W.) (W. Nanjing Rd. / Shimen Rd.) (formerly Shimen No. 1 Road).
- Jing'an Temple (W. Nanjing Rd. / Jiaozhou Rd.), in the farther western section of Nanjing Road.

Shanghai Metro Line 1 and 8 include the following station:

- People's Square (Nanjing Rd. / M. Tibet Rd.), the metro station on People's Square in the middle of Nanjing Road. Across the M. Tibet Road from this station is the west end of the pedestrianized part of the road. The Nanjing Rd / M. Tibet Road. crossing is the split point of E. and W. Nanjing Rd.

Shanghai Metro Line 10 includes the following station:

- Nanjing Road (E.) (E. Nanjing Rd / M. Henan Rd.) (formerly Henan Zhong Road), At the intersection between East Nanjing Road and Middle Henan Road.

Shanghai Metro Line 12 and Shanghai Metro Line 13 include the following station:

- Nanjing Road (W.) (W. Nanjing Rd. / Shimen Rd.)

== Events ==
Tourists and guests often celebrate various holidays at Nanjing Road, such as the Chinese New Year, New Year's Eve, Christmas and Easter. Some parts of the buildings and shopping malls seen in front of Nanjing Road may host a fireworks display over the street.

== See also ==
- Huaihai Road
- Wing On
- Sincere Department Store
