= HKR International =

Hong Kong conglomerate

HKR International Limited
- Company type: Public
- Traded as: SEHK: 480
- Industry: Conglomerate
- Predecessor: Hong Kong Resort Company
- Founded: May 25, 1973; 52 years ago in Hong Kong
- Founder: Dr. Cha Chi Ming
- Headquarters: 23/F, China Merchants Tower Shun Tak Centre, 168 Connaught Road, Central, Hong Kong
- Website: http://www.hkri.com/

HKR International
- Traditional Chinese: 香港興業國際集團有限公司
- Simplified Chinese: 香港兴业国际集团有限公司
Transcriptions
Standard Mandarin
- Hanyu Pinyin: Xiānggǎng Xīngyè Guójì Jítuán Yǒuxiàngōngsī
Yue: Cantonese
- Jyutping: hoeng1 gong2 hing3 gwok3 zai3 zaap6 tyun4 jau5 haan6 gung1 si1

HKR International Limited (Chinese: 香港興業國際集團有限公司, abbreviated as HKRI), formerly known as Hong Kong Resort International Limited, is a conglomerate headquartered in Hong Kong. The company was founded by Cha Chi-ming, a textile industrialist from Shanghai and one of the pioneers of Hong Kong's industrial boom in the 1950-70s.

The head office is in the Shun Tak Centre in Central.

== History ==
HKR International is traced back to Hong Kong Resort Company Limited (“Hong Kong Resort”) founded in 1973. In 1977, the company acquired the rights to Discovery Bay development on Lantau Island in an opaque and much criticized deal. HKRI now manages Discovery Bay as a privately owned and operated town of 20,000 people.

HKRI is listed on the Stock Exchange of Hong Kong, with a stock code 00480. The company has interests in real estate development and investment, property management, hotels and serviced apartments, healthcare services and other investments in Hong Kong, Mainland China and other parts of Asia.

== Major development ==
=== Real estate development and investment ===
Real estate development and investment is the core business of HKRI across Asia, including Hong Kong, Mainland China, Thailand and Japan. Discovery Bay on Lantau Island is its major project. At present, there are over 8,000 households with a total population of about 20,000.

==== Hong Kong ====
Covering a site area of 650 hectares (6,500,000 square metres), Discovery Bay has undergone continuous development. Facilities in the community include a golf course, a marina, a manmade beach, two clubhouses, two shopping centres, education options ranging from kindergarten to secondary schools, and a developed transportation system (including high-speed ferry and bus services and a privately built vehicle tunnel).

HKRI's other projects in Hong Kong include Villa LUCCA in Tai Po; La Cresta in Kau To, Shatin; 2GETHER in Wu On Street, Tuen Mun; Coastal Skyline in Tung Chung; and Discovery Park in Tsuen Wan. Over the years, a total GFA of more than 1.4 million square metres has been developed. HKRI acquired a residential building Wellgan Villa in Kowloon Tong in 2019.

For commercial properties, HKRI holds CDW Building in Tsuen Wan which includes a commercial building and a shopping centre named 8½. Other commercial properties are: DB Plaza and DBN Plaza in Discovery Bay, as well as West Gate Tower in Cheung Sha Wan, and United Daily News Centre in To Kwa Wan.

==== Mainland China ====
The development projects of HKRI located in Shanghai, Zhejiang and Tianjin.

In Shanghai, HKRI has partnered with Swire Properties to develop a project called HKRI Taikoo Hui. With a GFA of approximately 320,000 square metres, HKRI Taikoo Hui is a mixed-use complex comprising a retail centre, two Grade-A office towers, two hotels, one serviced apartment building, a number of event venues and the “Cha House”, a revitalized historic building.

HKRI Taikoo Hui locates in Jing’an district in Shanghai. Key anchor tenants include the first international Starbucks Reserve Roastery and Tasting Room in Asia and the largest CitySuper supermarket in mainland China. There are over 40 dining outlets, offering various types of cuisine, including Shanghai Club, the premium brand under Jardin de Jade, and Paris Blanc, a grill house managed by Paris Group.

HKRI has other residential projects in Zhejiang Province and Shanghai. City One in Jiaxing provides about 600 units, while the adjacent Riviera One, is composed of low- and high-rise apartment units. There are 3 other projects in Jiaxing, namely Mansion One, Creekside One and Starlight One. Other projects include Oasis One and In One in Hangzhou, Zhejiang, and Elite House, located in Changning District, Shanghai. HKRI also acquired a piece of land in Shanghai in November 2021 for a low-density residential project.

The Exchange is HKRI's investment property in Tianjin. It has a total GFA of over 152,000 square metres, and comprises two Grade-A office towers, a service apartment tower, and a retail mall named Heping Joy City – Tianjin.

==== Thailand ====
The Sukhothai Residences is located in Bangkok's CBD and provides 196 units. On top of The Sukhothai Residences, HKRI acquired a piece of freehold land on Witthayu Road in 2010. In December 2015, it further acquired 10 plots of land at Rama 3 Road by the Chaophraya River. HKRI acquired another three plots of land located at Ramintra Road, Khannayao District, Bangkok, in February 2018.

==== Japan ====
HKRI holds a plot as land bank with a site area of approximately 60,700 square metres in Niseko, Hokkaido, in the vicinity of Niseko Annupuri ski village.

=== Hospitality ===
==== Hong Kong ====
In Hong Kong, Auberge Discovery Bay Hong Kong opened in 2013. The hotel provides 325 guest rooms.

Discovery Bay Recreation Club & Club Siena

Discovery Bay Golf Club

Lantau Yacht Club (LYC) is one of the four membership clubs in Discovery Bay, and the first new marina to open in Hong Kong in more than a decade. The new marina is open in 2020 and is accredited as a 5 Gold Anchor Marina by the Marina Industries Association.

Discovery Bay Ice Rink was opened in May 2021.

==== Thailand ====
In Thailand, The Sukhothai Bangkok is located in the heart of city and is a member of the Design Hotels. It has 210 guest rooms and suites, 7 restaurants and 11 function rooms.

==== Shanghai ====
In Shanghai, The Sukhothai Shanghai is HKRI's third hotel and was open in April 2018.
