= Extra-settlement roads =

Roads in Shanghai

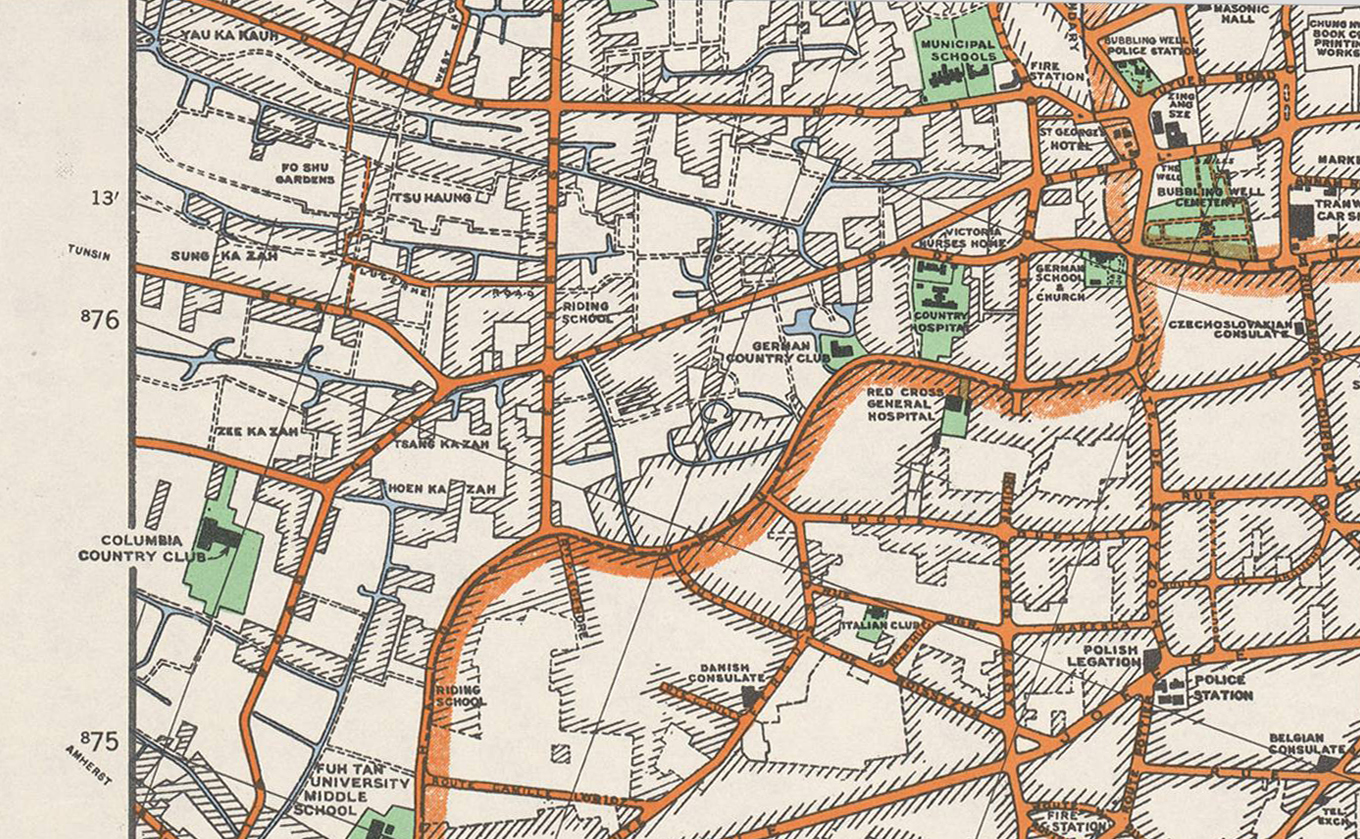
A map of the western districts of Shanghai in 1933, showing the extra-settlement roads area in the upper left.

The extra-settlement roads (Chinese: 越界築路) in Shanghai were roads constructed by the Shanghai International Settlement, a foreign concession in Shanghai, beyond its formal boundaries. The Settlement authorities obtained a certain degree of administrative authority over the extra-settlement roads and neighbouring areas, so that the extra-settlement roads area were regarded as a "quasi-concession" area attached to the concession area proper. The Settlement authorities had police powers alongside specific roads within the extra-settlement roads area, and had the power to levy rates or taxes in relation to services relating to the roads, but other administrative powers relating to the area remained with the Chinese government.

== Construction ==
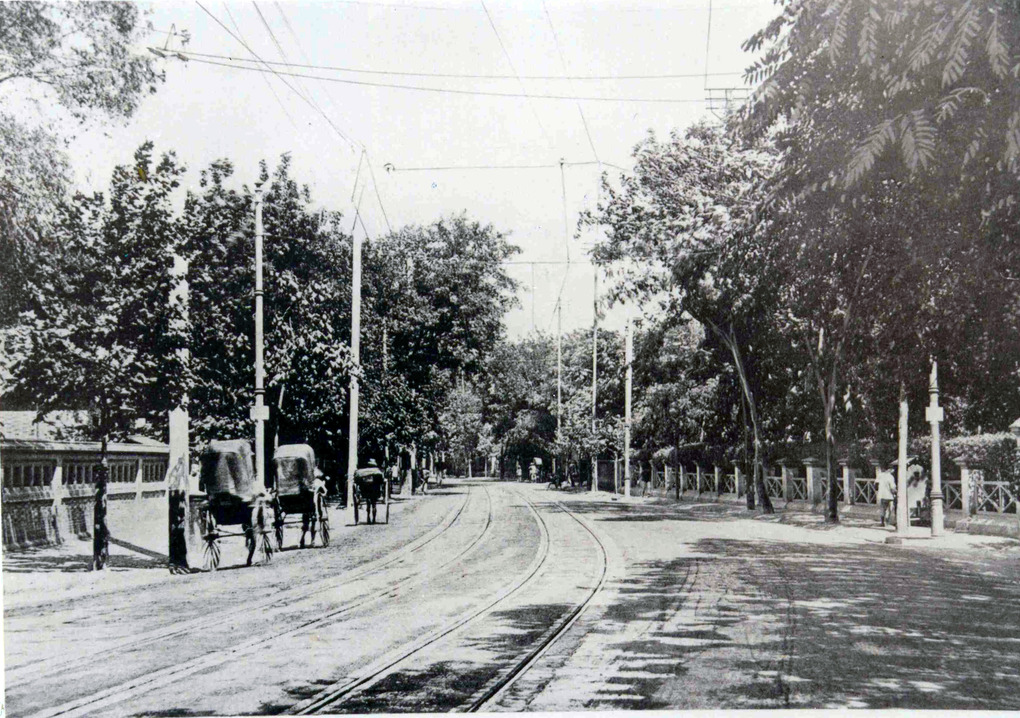
Bubbling Well Road was one of the first extra-settlement roads.

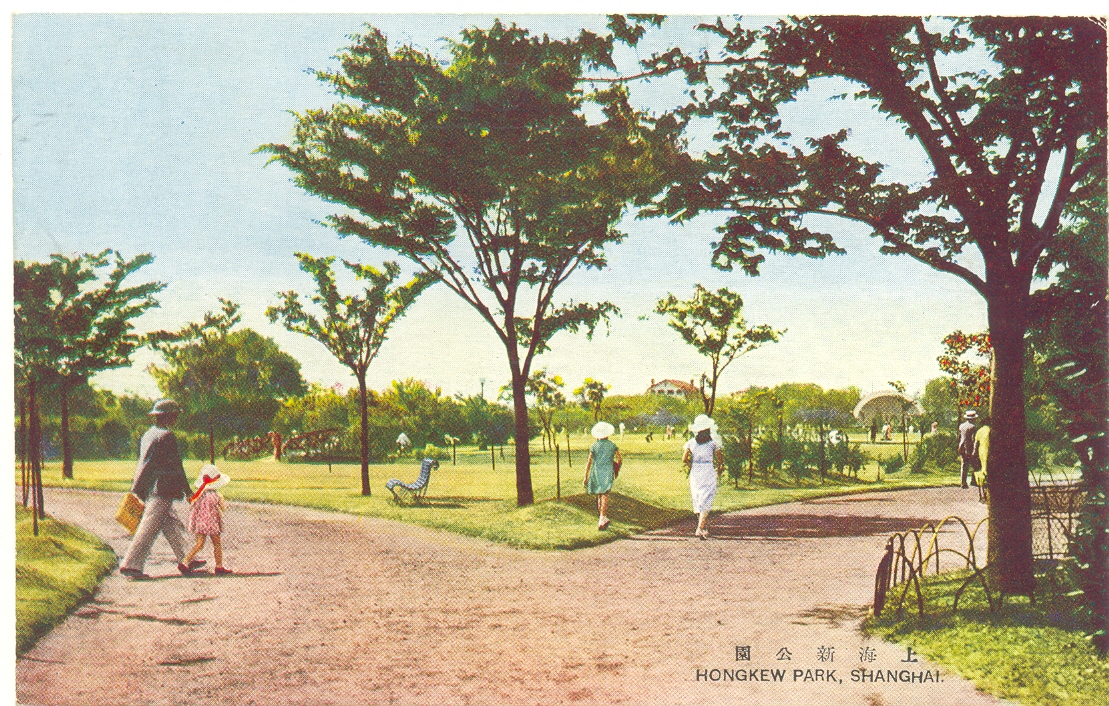
Hongkew Park, in the northern extra-settlement roads area.

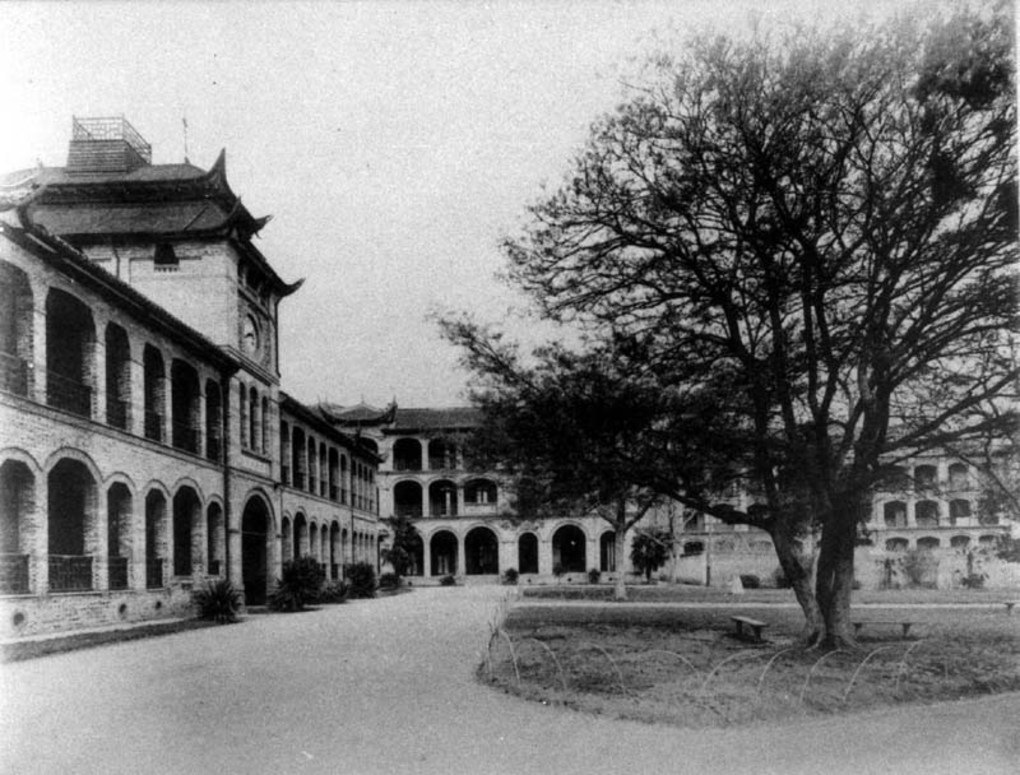
St John's University was located in the extra-settlement roads area.

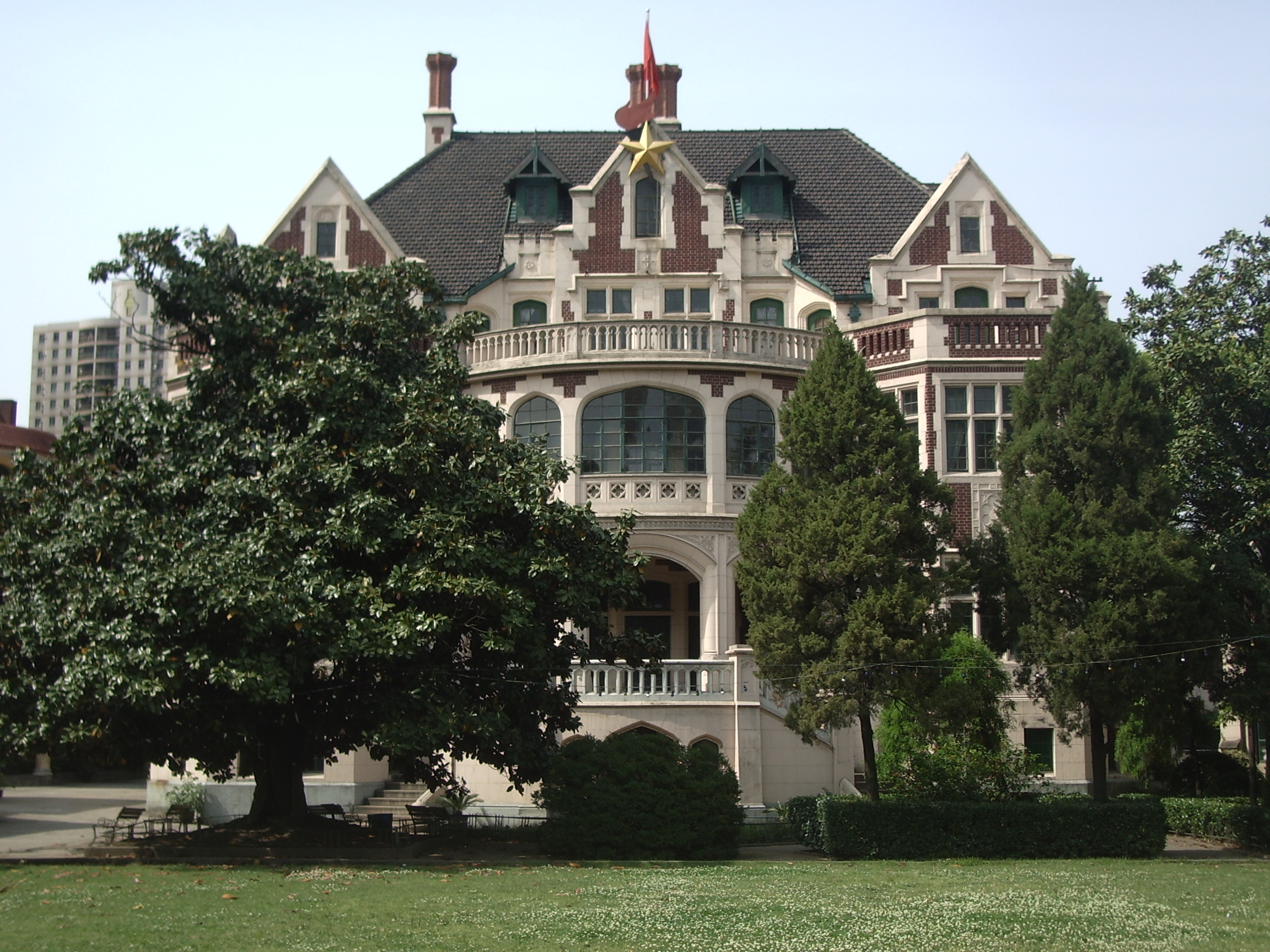
This house on Yu Yuen Road formerly belonged to Wang Boqun, a Republic of China minister, and is an example of the large houses built in the western extra-settlement roads area.

Extra-settlement roads were first built in the 1860s, during the Taiping Rebellion, ostensibly to connect the concession proper with other foreign properties or facilities which required protection from Britain and the other concession powers. Some major roads in Shanghai, such as Bubbling Well Road (静安寺路), Sinza Road (新闸路), Jessfield Road (极斯非而路) and Carter Road (卡德路) were all early extra-settlement roads. However, after the expansion of the International Settlement in 1899, the bulk of the extra-settlement roads area at that time were absorbed into the concession proper. From 1901, Settlement authorities began to construct more extra-settlement roads beyond the new boundary, with the plan to eventually expand the concession to also cover this rea.

In the late 19th to early 20th century, the Shanghai French Concession also had a relatively large extra-settlement roads area. However, in 1914, the Shanghai French Concession obtained police and taxation powers over the entire French extra-settlement roads area, which amounted to an expansion of the French Concession. The former French extra-settlement roads area became known as the "new French Concession".

Encouraged by the French expansion, the International Settlement also requested an expansion of the concession to include the entire extra-settlement roads area east of the Shanghai-Hangzhou railway. However, the political atmosphere in the capital Beijing had changed by this time, and the administration of president Yuan Shikai was facing a popular movement against the Twenty-One Demands raised by Japan. Given the public mood against concessions being made to foreign powers, the Chinese government turned down the International Settlement's request for expansion. Meanwhile, the British government (the principal power behind the International Settlement) was itself occupied with the conduct of the First World War, and did not pursue the issue further. As a result, the extra-settlement roads area maintained its quasi-concession status until the abolition of the concession in 1941. After the May Thirtieth Movement in 1925, there was only very sporadic further additions to the extra-settlement roads.

Extra-settlement roads built in the 20th century were located in the west and north of Shanghai. The extra-settlement roads consisted of almost 40 roads, of which 28 were located in the west. The western extremity of the extra-settlement roads area was the western end of Hung Jao Road (虹桥路), which was 10 kilometres west of the western districts of the Shanghai International Settlement (near Jing'an Temple). The entire extra-settlement roads area consisted of 31 square kilometres, which made it larger than the concession proper (at 22 square kilometres).

The western extra-settlement roads area was especially popular with well-to-do Shanghainese residents of all nationalities. Unlike the bulk of the formal International Settlement, which was densely built with residential, commercial and industrial buildings sometimes in close proximity, many of the extra-settlement roads were leafy, wide streets dotted with detached houses set in large grounds. The area was seen as the "picturesque suburbs" of Shanghai. This contrasted, however, with the expansive shanty towns that developed along the canals in the same area.

== Governance ==
In 1906, the Shanghai Municipal Council (the governing authority of the International Settlement) began levying "special rates" (colloquially known as "water rates" or "police rates") on residents in the extra-settlement roads area who used tap water supplied by the International Settlement. However, in contrast to the concession proper, the Chinese government continued to levy some rates and taxes in the extra-settlement roads area.

In 1918, the Municipal Council first posted concession police to Bubbling Well Road to manage traffic. Subsequently, concession police were stationed along most extra-settlement roads.

In the 1910s and 1920s, the extra-settlement roads area were also subject to the jurisdiction of the International Mixed Court (which dealt with cases involving Chinese or non-treaty power residents in the International Settlement).

== Japanese zone ==
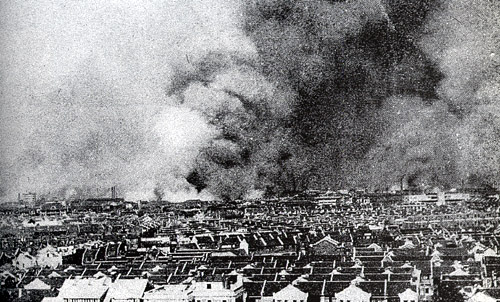
Zhabei, part of which is in the northern extra-settlement roads area, on fire during the Battle of Shanghai.

During the Northern Expedition of 1927, North Szechuan Road and the extra-settlement roads area east of it to Hungkow Port were garrisoned by Japanese troops. Japanese troops retained control of this area until the January 28 incident of 1932, which gave the Japanese the opportunity to push the western boundary of this zone to the Shanghai–Woosung railway. In the fierce fighting during that battle, Japanese forces were able to occupy the urban area of the Zhabei Chinese zone, and several towns in the northern suburbs. As part of the ceasefire agreement, Japan agreed to withdraw to within the northern and eastern part of the International Settlement and the extra-settlement roads area.

In the 1937 Battle of Shanghai, the Chinese army pressed into the Japanese zone in the northern and eastern part of the International Settlement and the extra-settlement roads area. The fierce fighting, including the use of heavy weaponry, caused extensive damage to this area. After Japan retook control over the area at the end of the battle, Imperial Japanese Navy Land Forces evicted International Settlement police, and Japanese forces took full control over this area.

== Demise ==
During the Battle of Shanghai in 1937, the built-up part of the western extra-settlement roads area (east of the Shanghai-Hangzhou railway) were garrisoned by British and Italian troops. The British garrison area was much larger, separated from the Italian area in the northeast by Jessfield Road, and from the French concession in the southeast by Avenue Haig (華山路). In the south it extended to Jordan Road (陆家路), in the west to the Shanghai-Hangzhou railway and in the north to Suzhou Creek. The Italian garrison was responsible for the narrow zone between Jessfield Road and Kiao Chow Road (胶州路) and bounded in the north by Suzhou Creek.

During the earlier phase of the Sino-Japanese War, the special status of the extra-settlement roads area meant that numerous competing forces operated in the area. A number of Chinese collaborators of the Japanese occupiers bought property in the area. The Japanese secret police security service was located at 76 Jessfield Road, and several clashes occurred between "no. 76" operatives and the International Settlement police. In 1940, British forces withdrew, after which the extra-settlement roads area came under heavier Japanese influence until it was fully occupied in 1941 with the full eruption of World War II after the attack on Pearl Harbor.
