= HKRI Taikoo Hui =

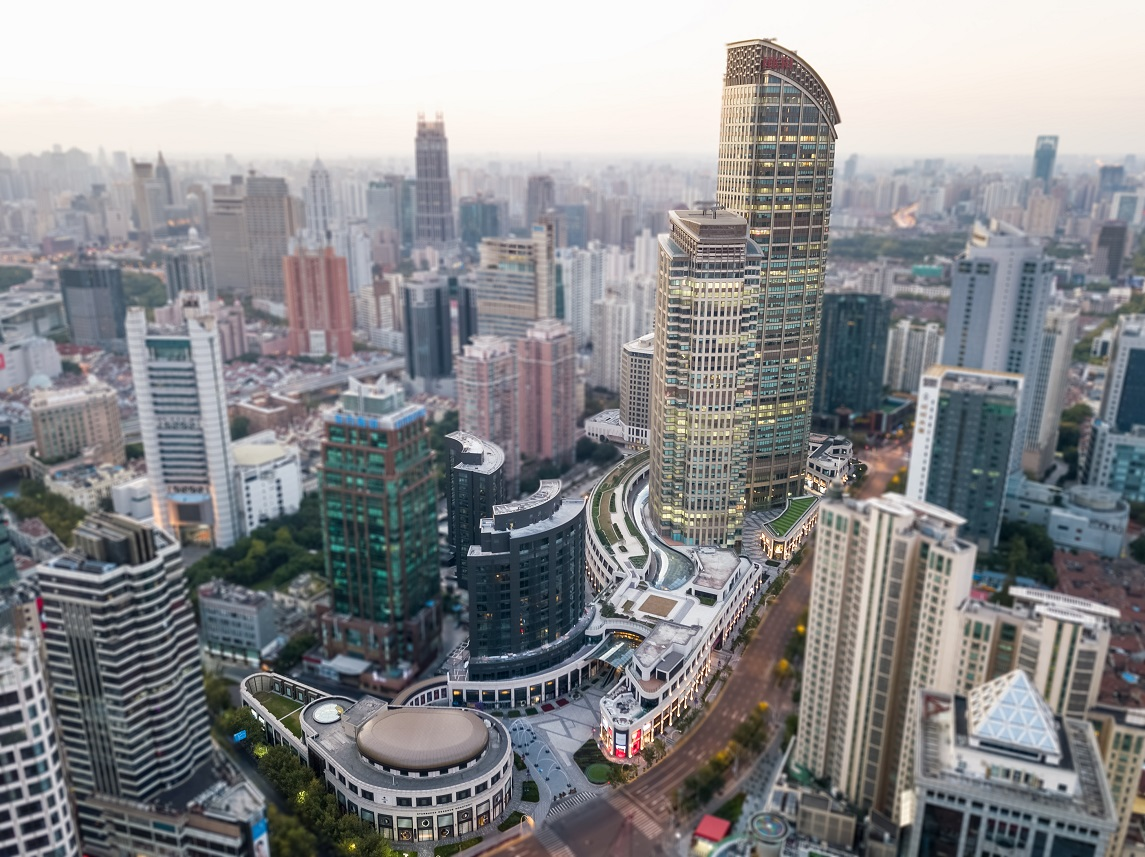
- Location: Jing'an District, Shanghai, China
- Coordinates: 31.230622°N 121.460644°E
- Address: 789 West Nanjing Road
- Opened: 2017
- Developer: Swire Properties, HKR International
- Num. of stores: 250 brands, including the first Starbucks Reserve Roastery in Asia
- Floor area: Approximately 3,460,000 sq ft (321,000 m^{2})
- Website: www.hkri.com

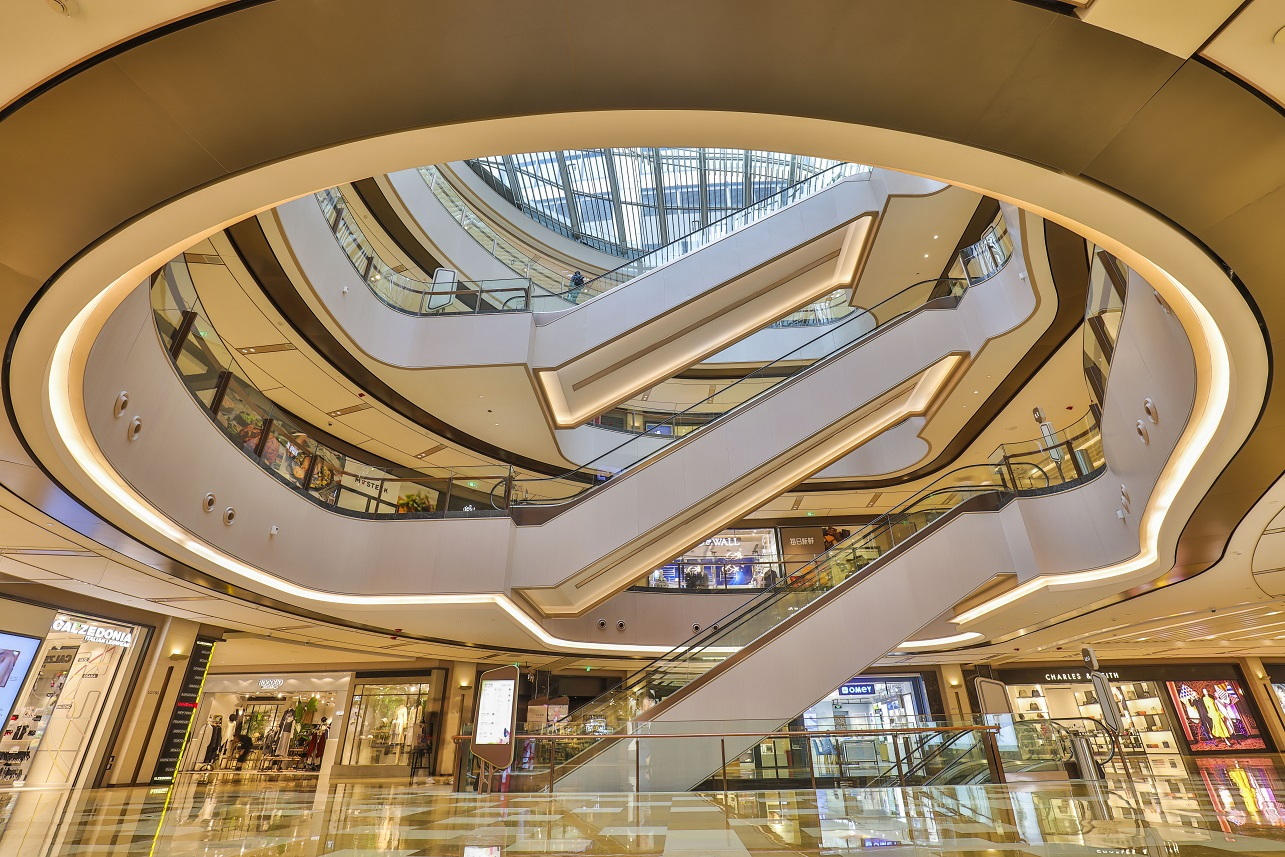
HKRI Taikoo Hui interior

HKRI Taikoo Hui (Chinese: 興業太古滙; pinyin: Xīngyè Tàigǔ Huì) is a mixed use development on West Nanjing Road in Shanghai, China. It comprises two office towers, a large retail mall, 102 serviced apartments and a 111-room hotel called The Middle House. In late 2017, Starbucks opened a 30,000-square-foot (2,800 m^{2}) Reserve Roastery at the project, the largest Starbucks branch in the world at the time.

== Location ==
HKRI Taikoo Hui is located in central Jing'an District on the busy shopping street of Nanjing Road. It is accessible by foot from West Nanjing Road station on the Shanghai metro, where lines 2, 12 and 13 converge. The shopping centre is also located close to Yan'an Elevated Road and the North-South Elevated Road, two of Shanghai's major highways.

== History and construction ==
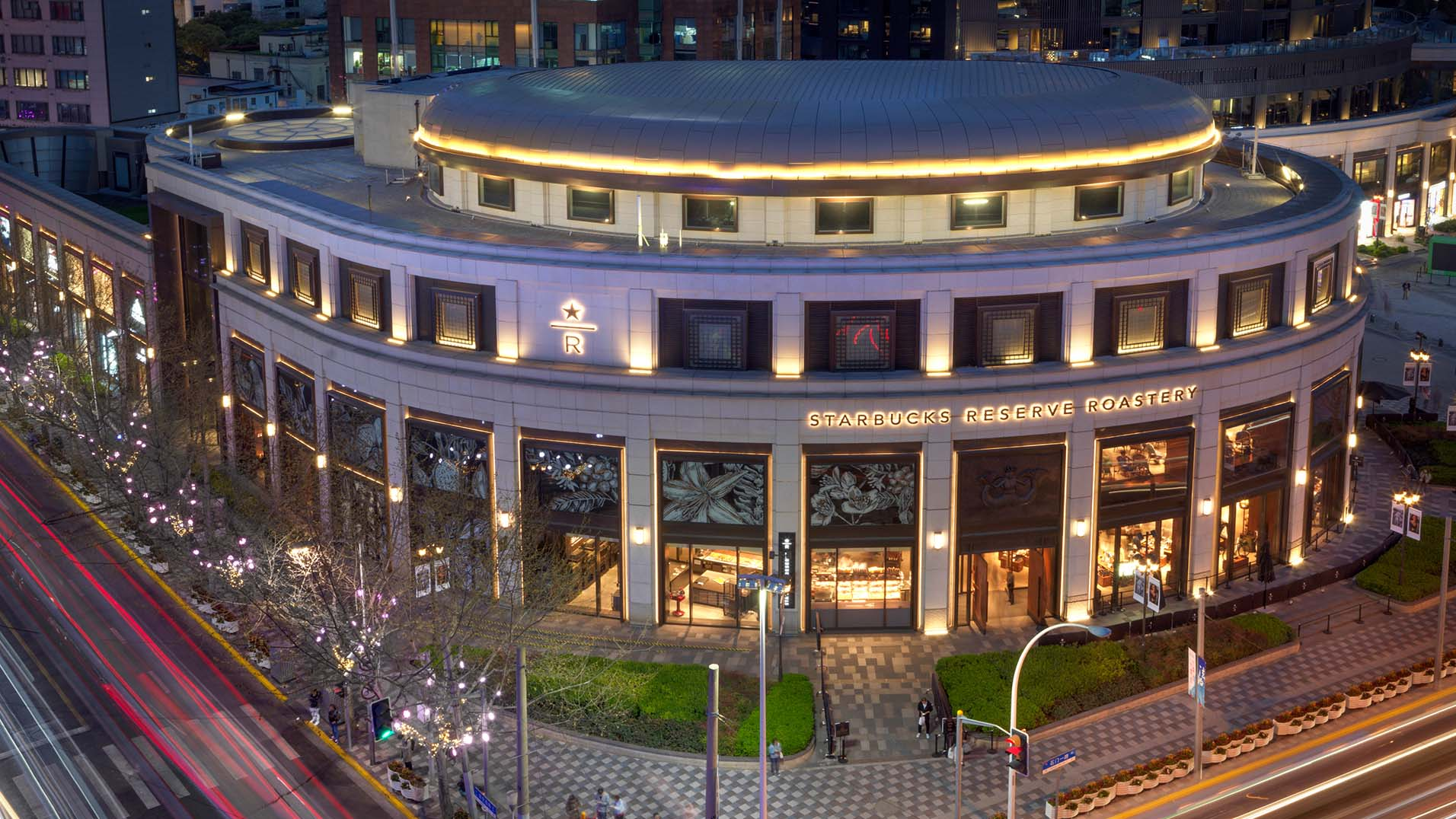
Starbucks Reserve Roastery

The Dazhongli site upon which HKRI Taikoo Hui was built was first acquired in 2002. The launch of the project, a 50:50 joint venture between HKR International and Swire Properties was announced in 2006. Designed by Wong & Ouyang, the mixed use project was topped out in November 2015 in a ceremony with Zhou Haiying, Deputy Governor of Jing'an District. The mall celebrated its grand opening in May 2017 with The Middle House, a 111-room hotel designed by Italian architect Piero Lissoni, opening in April 2018.
