= Hong Kong Resort Company =

Hong Kong Resort Company Limited (Chinese: 香港興業有限公司) is a joint venture between HKR International and CITIC Pacific. It is best known for the Discovery Bay development, on Lantau Island, Hong Kong.

Hong Kong Resort Co. Limited was incorporated in 1973. Until 1994, Hong Kong Resort was a wholly owned subsidiary of HKR International Ltd. CITIC Pacific acquired a 50% interest that year.
