= Tian An Centre =

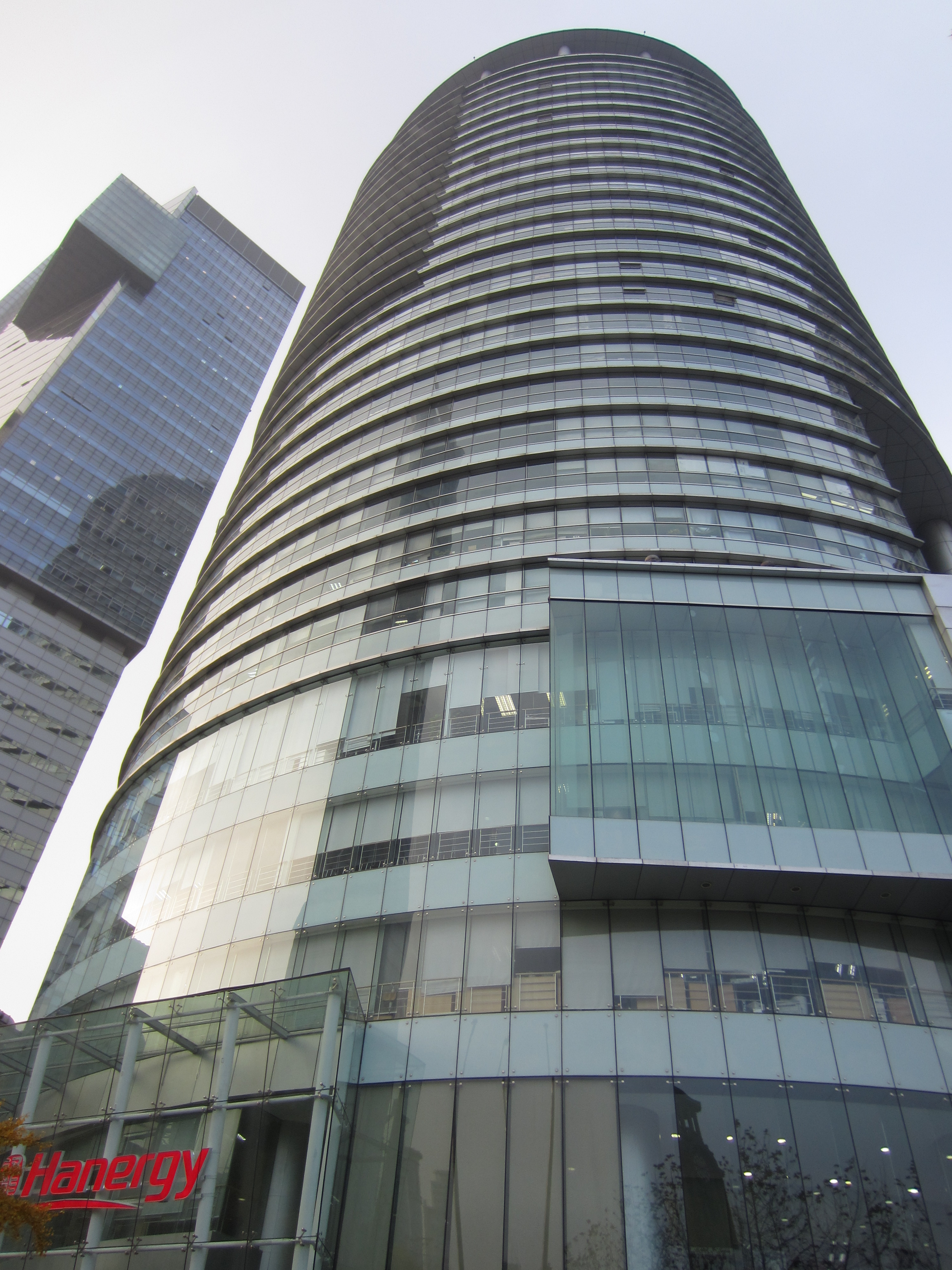
- Interactive map of the Tian An Centre area

General information
- Type: Skyscraper
- Location: Shanghai, China
- Coordinates: 31.2320°N 121.4696°E

Tian An Centre is a commercial office building and skyscraper located at 338 West Nanjing Road in Shanghai, China. The building has an approximately 13,700-square-metre shopping centre as well as 34,500 square metres of office space. Among the tenants is Longmen Art Projects.
