= Starbucks Reserve =

International café chain and brand

- Industry: Coffee
- Founded: 2010; 16 years ago
- Parent: Starbucks
- Website: www.starbucksreserve.com

Starbucks Reserve is a program by the flagship international coffeehouse chain Starbucks. The program involves operation of worldwide roasteries; currently seven are in operation. Also part of the program are 28 coffee bars preparing Starbucks Reserve products, what Starbucks considers its rarest and best-quality coffees, usually single-origin coffees. Some Starbucks Reserve coffee is also sold in about 1,500 of the chain's traditional outlets.

Map of Starbucks Reserve roasteries

== History ==
The program began as Starbucks desired to compete in the high-end coffee market, competing against premium coffee retailers like Stumptown Coffee Roasters, Dillanos Coffee Roasters and Blue Bottle Coffee.

Starbucks began its Starbucks Reserve program in 2010 through online sales and a small number of its retail locations, selling small-batch arabica coffees. Later, the company opened its first Reserve location, a three-story store in Latin America, solely selling Colombian coffee. The first Starbucks Reserve roastery opened in December 2014 in Seattle.

== Types ==
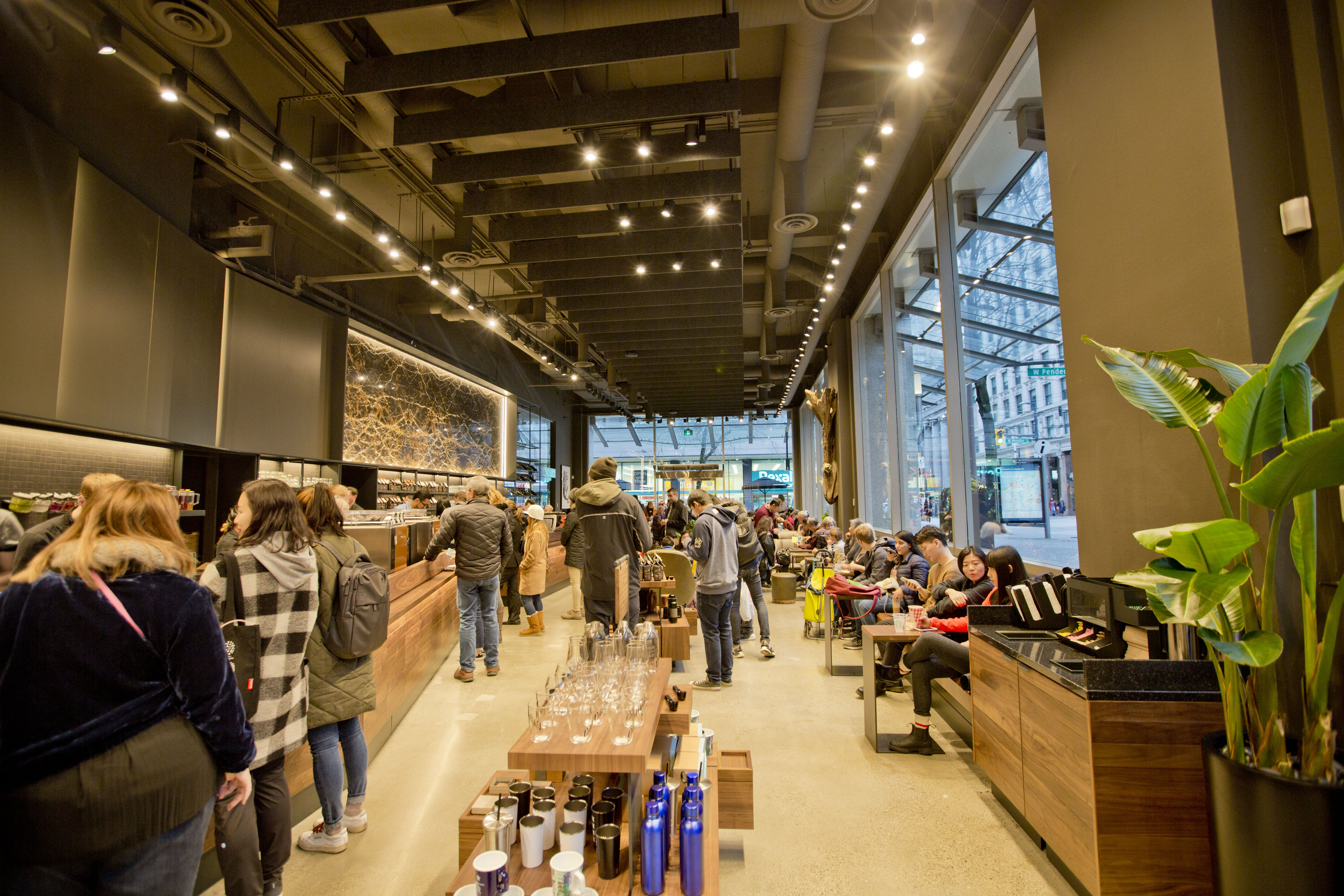
A Starbucks Reserve Bar in Vancouver

Starbucks Reserve includes three different types of locations: the "Starbucks Reserve Roastery", the "Reserve Bar", and the "Reserve Store". The roasteries, usually tens of thousands of square feet (thousands of square meters), are often described as a theme park experience, including coffee bars with tastings, cocktail bars, areas to observe the roasting and brewing processes, areas to purchase food, and local artwork throughout. The facilities also roast, package, and ship coffee to stores in their regions.

The company currently operates a total of five roasteries, in Shanghai (2017), Milan (2018), New York City (2018), Tokyo (2019), and Chicago (2019). The company initially planned to open at least 20 roasteries, though it announced in 2019 that it would be scaling back its plans, with Chicago being the last roastery to be built at the moment.

Reserve Bars are traditional Starbucks locations that sell some Starbucks Reserve products, supplied by a regional roastery. There are 43 locations, all of which include the regular Starbucks menu, and also have a coffee bar for a similar experience to the coffee bars in the roasteries. There are currently approximately seven Reserve Stores in operation, located in New York, Mumbai, Prague and Shanghai; and the newest in Riyadh, Saudi Arabia. These stores sell merchandise, food and drink such as Reserve Coffee, Princi food items, and locally-unique merchandise similar to that of the roasteries.

== Roasteries ==
=== Seattle ===
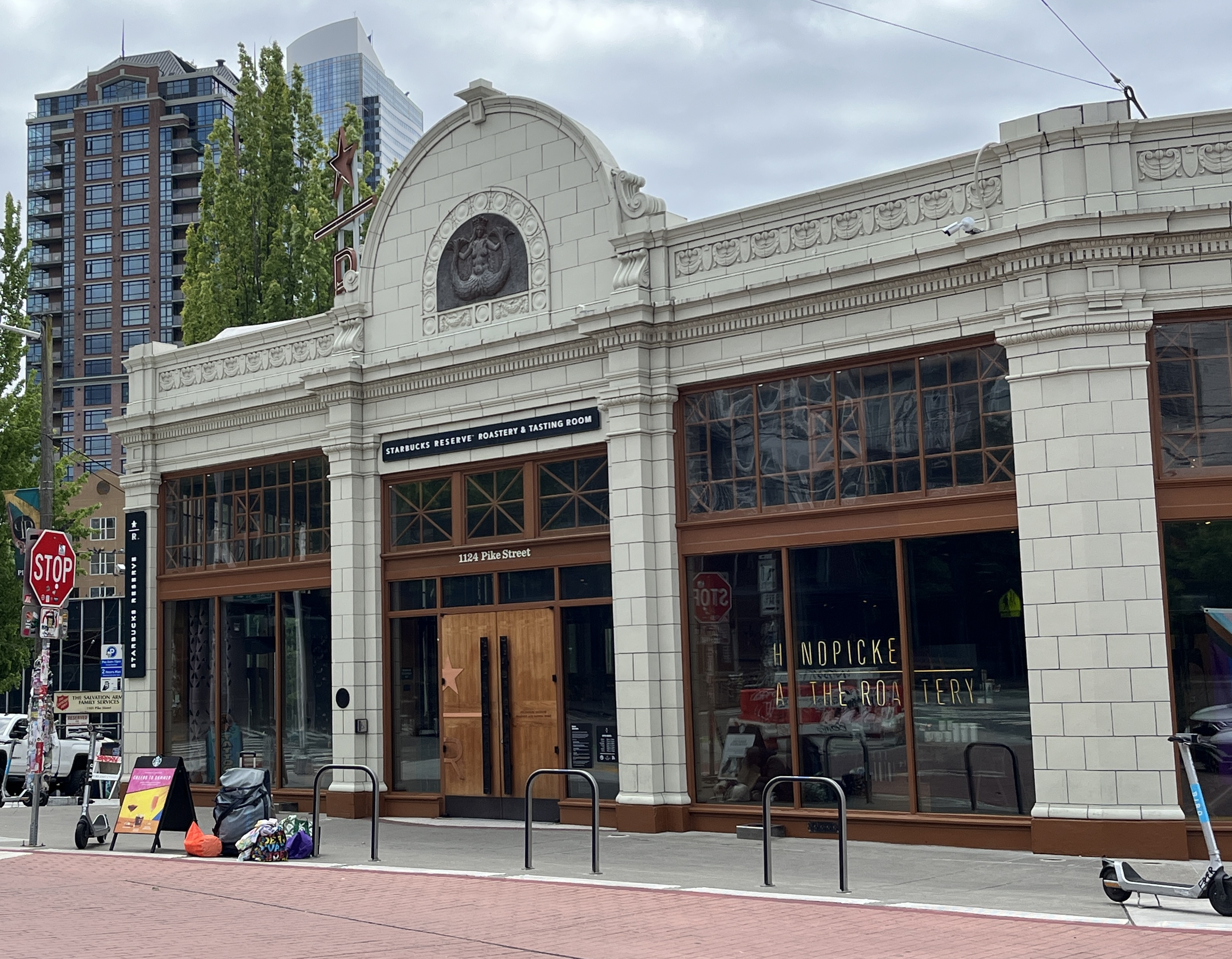
Exterior of the Seattle roastery, 2024

The first Starbucks Reserve roastery opened in December 2014 in the Capitol Hill neighborhood of Seattle. It had 15,000 square feet (1,400 m^{2}) and is rumored to have cost about $20 million. The roastery included a split-flap display, a departure board style common in 20th century railway stations. The board was created by Solari di Udine and displays the coffees being roasted. It was announced in 2025, the Seattle Reserve location will be closing. The location closed in September 2025.

=== Shanghai ===
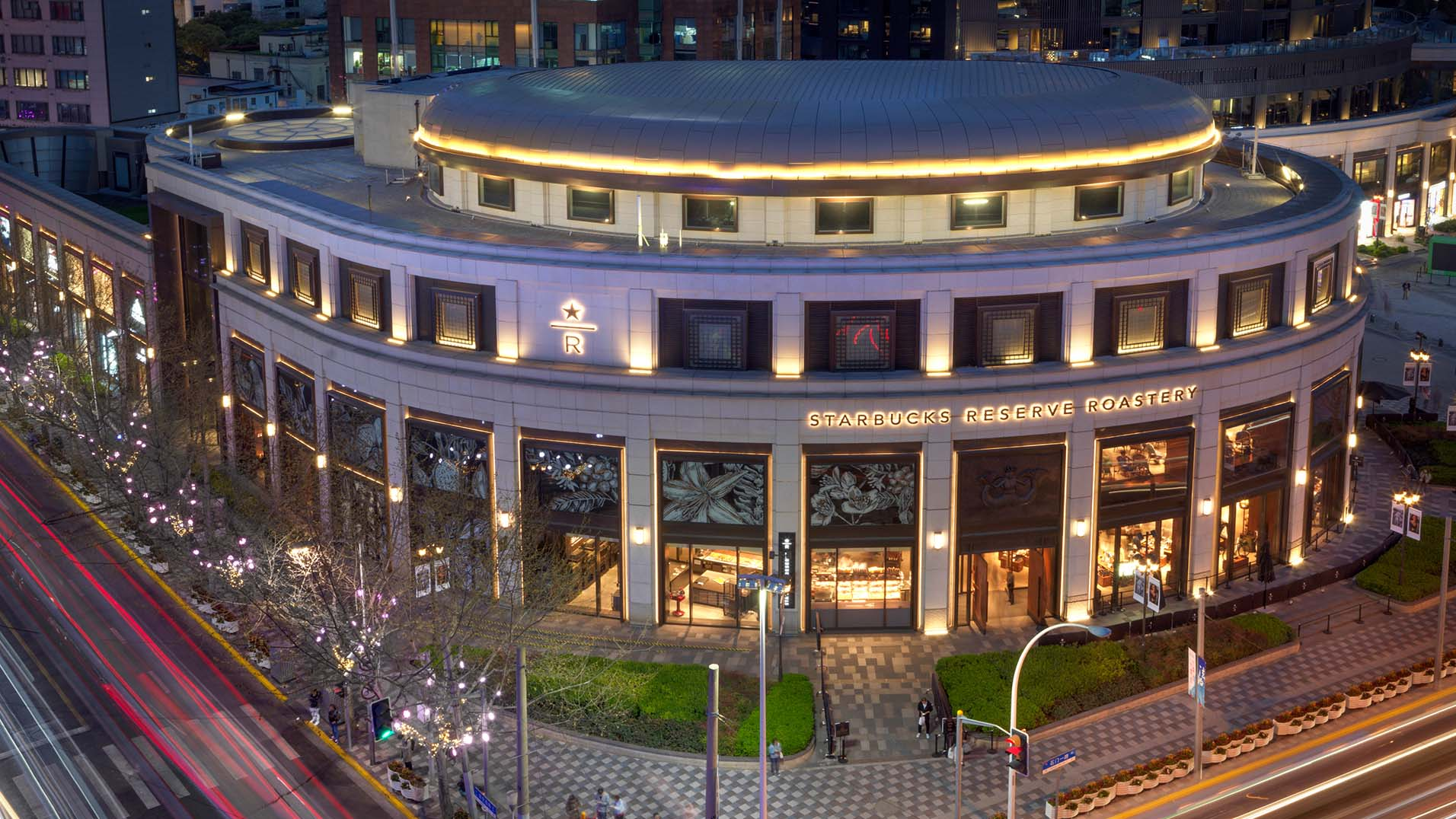
Shanghai roastery

The roastery in Shanghai, China, is located in the HKRI Taikoo Hui mixed-use development, on the luxury shopping strip Nanjing Road. It opened in December 2017 and was the largest Starbucks location in the world at that time, since surpassed by the Chicago roastery. The Shanghai roastery has 30,000 square feet (2,800 m^{2}) between two stories. It is typically fully packed with customers, with lines out the door typical in peak times.

The Shanghai roastery has a roasting facility, three coffee bars, a Teavana tea bar, and an augmented reality feature designed by Alibaba: information about coffees and the roasting process viewable by opening the company's Taobao app and pointing it in different places. The store also includes a marketplace, a wine and beer tasting area, a bar for scooping bags of beans to purchase, and places to sample different coffees throughout the store. Similar to other roasteries, a two-story bronze cask sits at the center of the store. The cask is decorated with 1,000 traditional Chinese stamps, hand-engraved, telling stories of the company and coffee. The cask weighs 40 short tons (36 t), and holds beans roasted in the facility, which are periodically dispersed through pipes around the facility for use. One of the roastery's coffee bars is 88 feet (27 m) long, the longest Starbucks coffee bar in existence. Similar to Seattle, the building also features an old-fashioned split-flap display board, showing which varieties are being roasted, and information about their flavors and origin. Many of the roastery's beans were grown in China's Yunnan province. The roastery also includes a Princi location, selling pizzas and focaccia. A coffee library includes books on the history of coffee, brewing methods, coffee art, and the history of Starbucks. The Teavana bar is popular due to China's traditional tea culture; the bar has a wide variety of teas, brewing methods, and tea-based drinks.

=== Milan ===
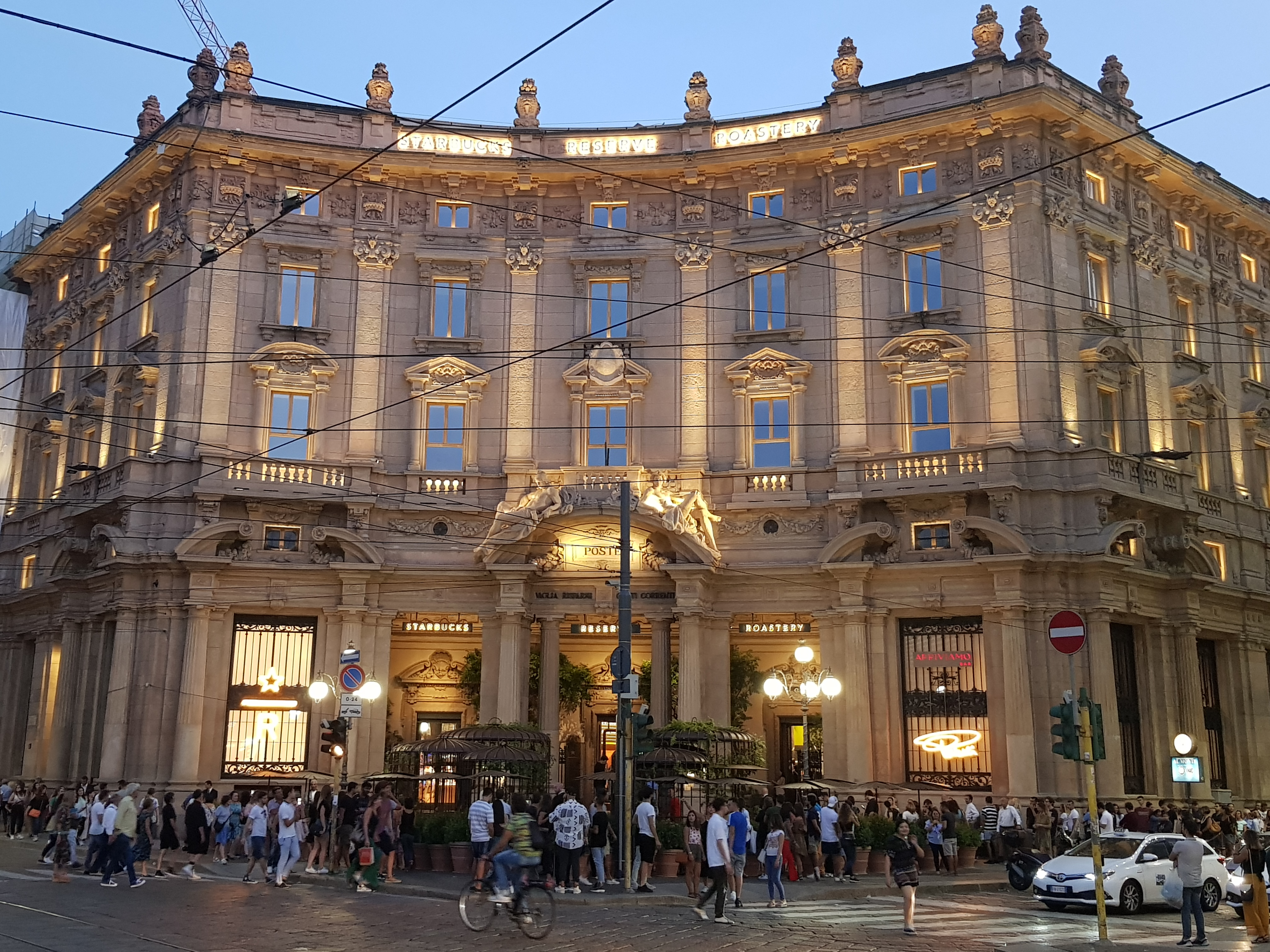
Milan roastery

The roastery in Milan is located in the Palazzo Broggi, formerly the city's stock exchange and main post office building. The building sits in the Piazza Cordusio, a plaza in the center of the city. The roastery opened on September 7, 2018, becoming the first of any Starbucks in Italy, and the first and only roastery in Europe. It is the largest Starbucks in Europe, with 25,000 square feet (2,300 m^{2}). The location was chosen as the city of Milan was where Howard Schultz visited in 1983, inspiring him to add espresso drinks to Starbucks, develop cafés, and create the coffeehouse chain out of the single original location.

=== New York City ===
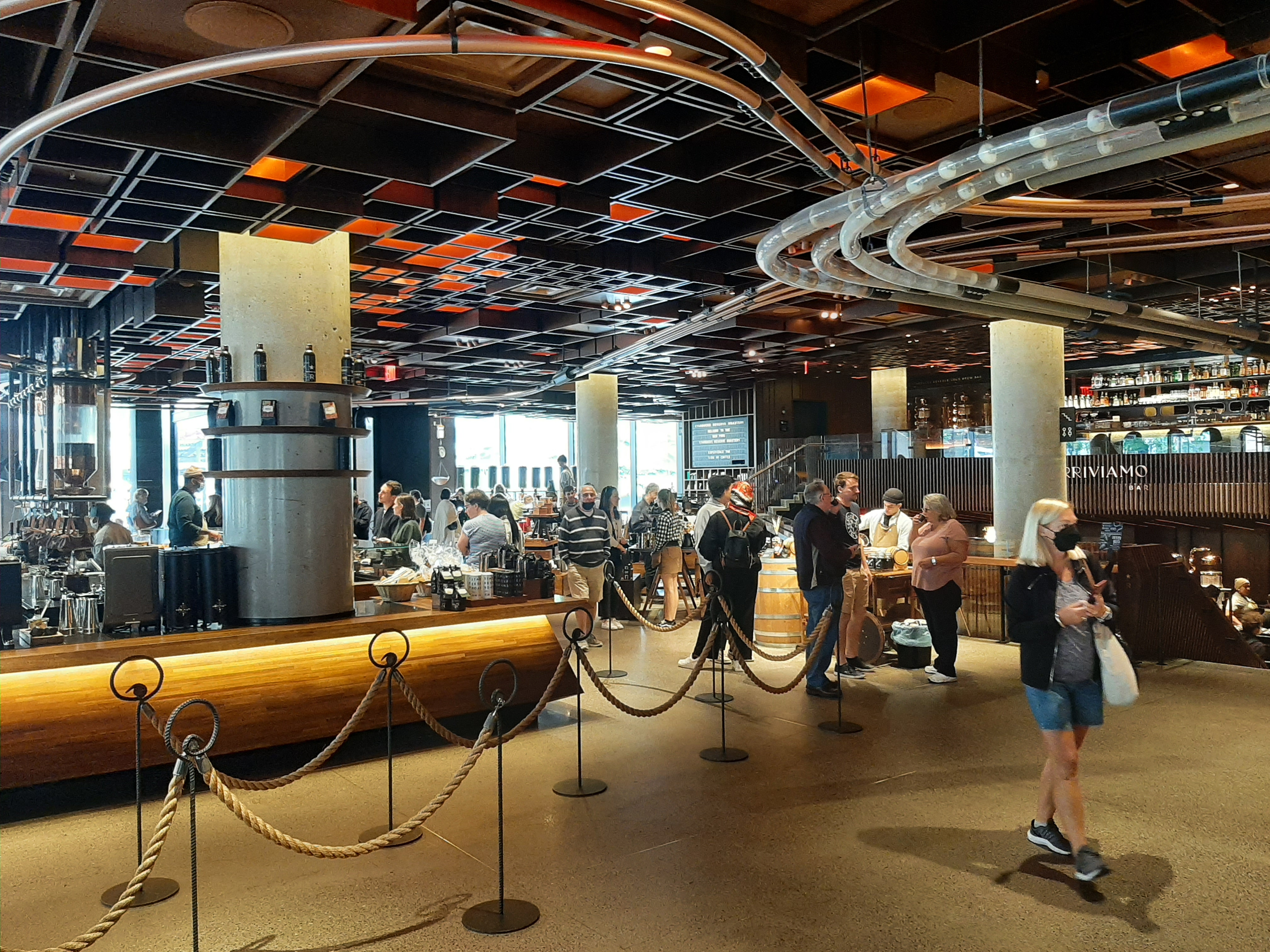
New York City roastery

The New York location is in Manhattan's neighborhood of Chelsea; it opened on December 13, 2018. It occupies the first floor of 61 Ninth Avenue. The location has 23,000 square feet (2,100 m^{2}), and includes a coffee roastery, two coffee bars, a cocktail bar, bakery, and a terrarium. The bakery, operated by Princi, has baked goods, pizzas, salads, and breads. The cocktail bar, a branded "Arriviamo Bar", has coffee- and tea-based cocktails. The interior ceiling has artistic squares and rectangles resembling the building's exterior architecture. The terrarium resembles Hacienda Alsacia, a coffee farm in Costa Rica, and the first and only farm owned by Starbucks.

=== Tokyo ===
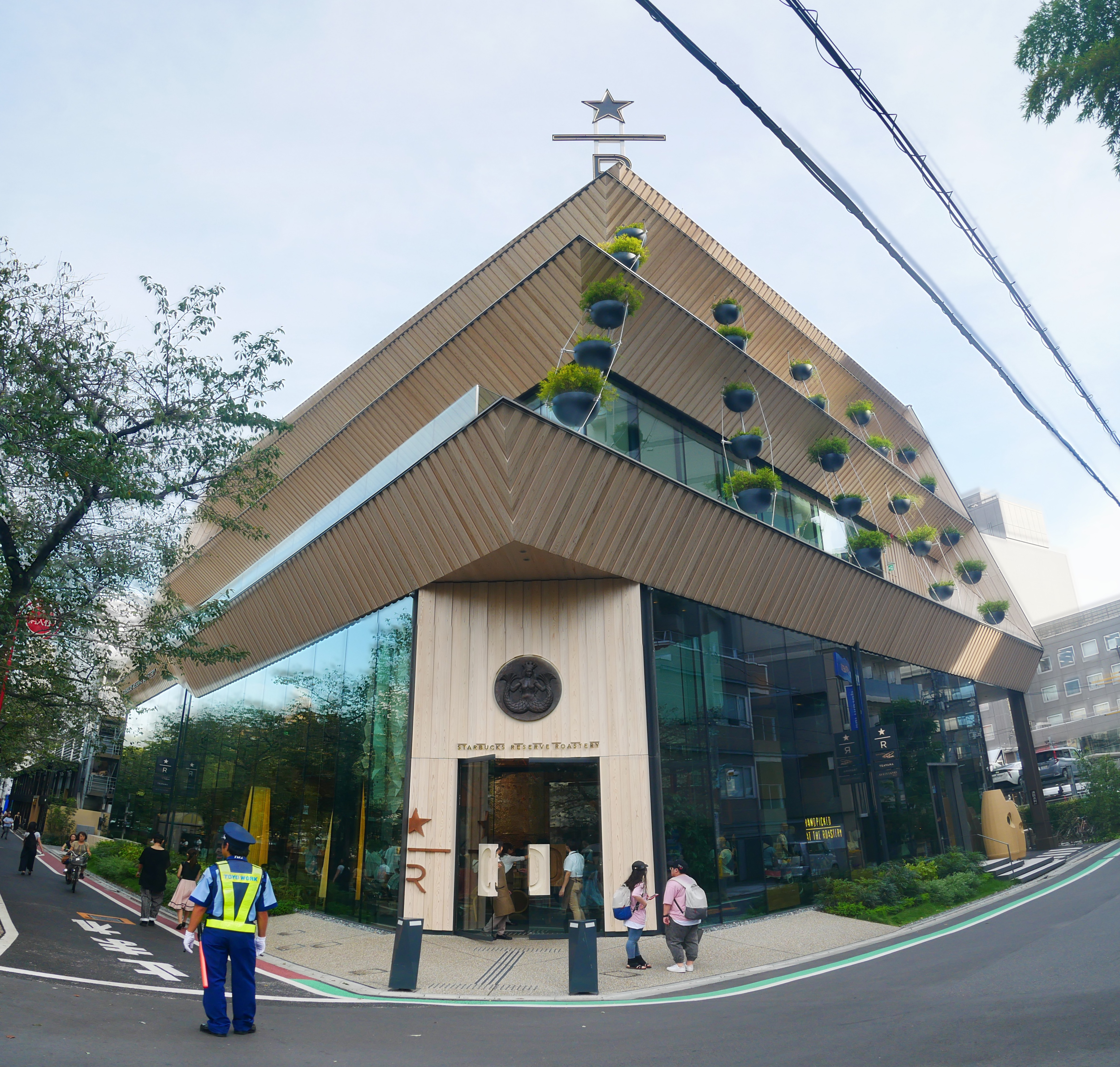
Tokyo roastery

The Tokyo roastery opened in Tokyo's Nakameguro district on February 28, 2019. The roastery has about 32,000 square feet (3,000 m^{2}), and was designed by Kengo Kuma and built with Japanese cedar. It is the only Reserve Roastery building purpose-built; the other roasteries repurposed existing buildings. The interior has four floors, each including decorative elements of Japanese culture. The first floor holds the main coffee bar, while the second floor holds a Teavana tea bar offering 18 different teas and tea-based beverages. The third-floor cocktail bar, branded a "Arriviamo Bar", has coffee- and tea-infused cocktails, Japanese versions of classic cocktails, and nonalcoholic cocktails. The fourth floor has the "Amu Inspiration Lounge", an event space planned to be certified as a training location by the Specialty Coffee Association of Japan.

Central to the space is a 56-foot-tall (17 m) copper cask, made of 121 copper plates hand-hammered in the Japanese tsuchime technique. The cask holds roasted coffee beans, allowing them to settle and gas to escape before brewing or packaging. Around the cask are 2,100 copper cherry blossoms suspended from the ceiling, an homage to the nearby Meguro River, popular for its numerous blossoming cherry trees. Extending from the cask are copper pipes that deliver coffee beans across different areas of the store. The facility has two roasters, a 260-pound (118 kg) Probat G-120 and a 35-pound (16 kg) Probat P25 roaster, able to roast up to 4,000 pounds (1,800 kg) of coffee each day. The coffee is used in the roastery and shipped to retailers throughout Japan.

=== Chicago ===
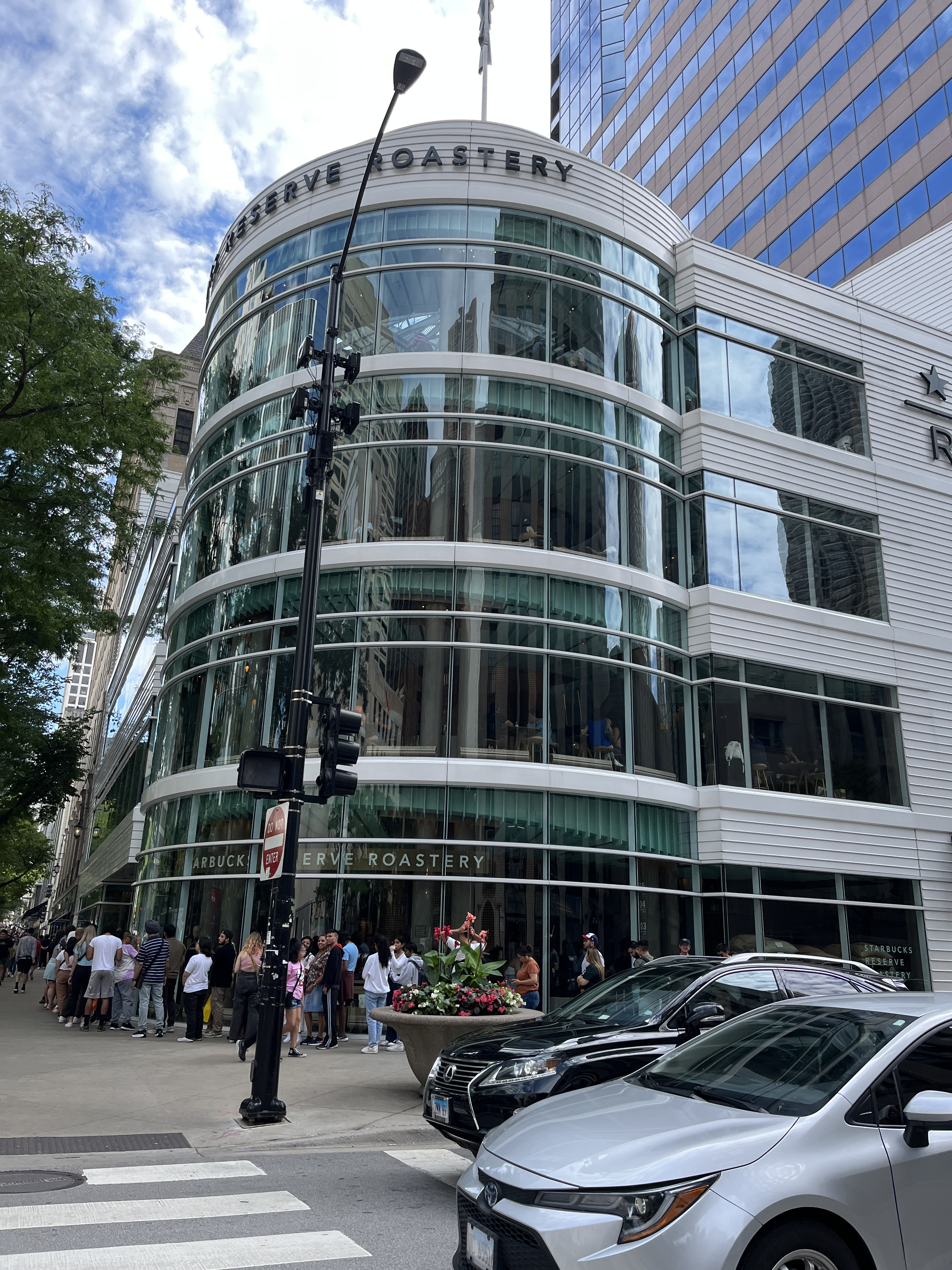
Exterior of the Chicago roastery, 2023

The Chicago roastery, which opened November 15, 2019, is the largest Starbucks location in the world and latest roastery to be built. The building at 646 North Michigan Avenue on the Magnificent Mile has five stories at 35,000 square feet (3,300 m^{2}); it was formerly a flagship store for Crate & Barrel.

== Reception ==
An article for Business Insider described Starbucks Reserve as more expensive than regular locations, and more like an "art studio" than a cafe, due to the art work lining the walls.
