= Damuqiao Road station =

Shanghai Metro interchange station

Damuqiao Road 大木桥路
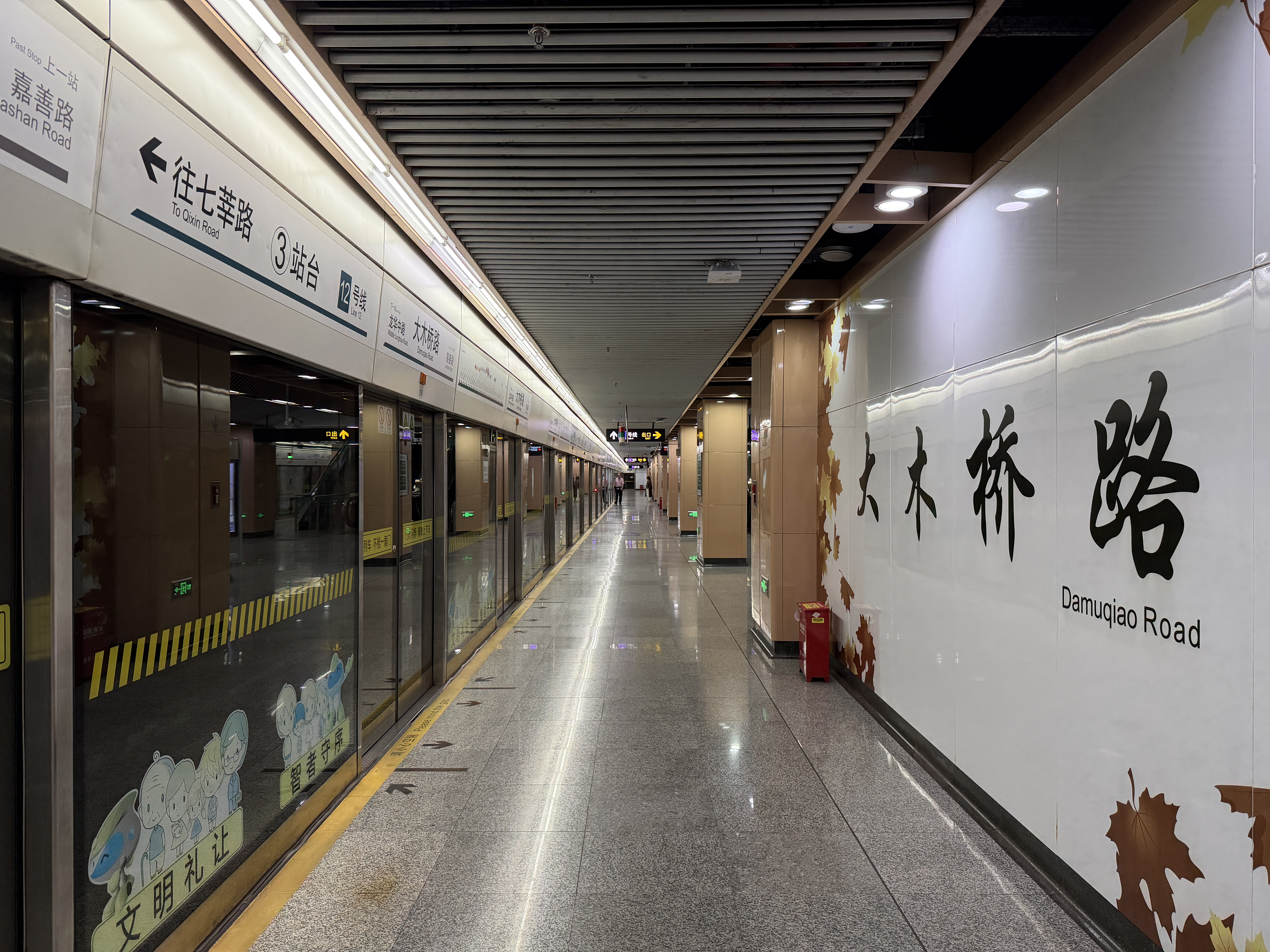
- Line 12 platform

General information
- Location: Damuqiao Road and Lingling Road (零陵路); Xuhui District, Shanghai; China
- Coordinates: 31°11′40″N 121°27′48″E
- Operator: Shanghai No. 3/4 Metro Operation Co. Ltd.
- Lines: Line 4; Line 12
- Platforms: 4 (2 island platforms)
- Tracks: 4

Construction
- Structure type: Underground
- Accessible: Yes

History
- Opened: 31 December 2005; 20 years ago (Line 4); 19 December 2015; 10 years ago (Line 12)

Services
| Preceding station | Shanghai Metro | Following station |
|---|---|---|
| Dong'an Road Clockwise | Line 4 | Luban Road Counter-clockwise |
| Middle Longhua Road towards Qixin Road | Line 12 | Jiashan Road towards Jinhai Road |
Location
- Location within Shanghai

Damuqiao Road (simplified Chinese: 大木桥路; traditional Chinese: 大木橋路; pinyin: Dàmùqiáo Lù) is an interchange station between Line 4 and Line 12 of the Shanghai Metro. This station was one of 16 that opened in the third section from (Qufu Road to Qixin Road) of Line 12 on 19 December 2015. Between 31 December 2005 and 29 December 2007, this station served as the western terminus of Line 4 before the remaining section of the loop between here and Lancun Road opened on 29 December 2007.

== Station layout ==
| G | Entrances and Exits | Exits 1-4 |
| B1 | Line 4 Concourse | Faregates, Station Agent |
| B1 | Line 12 Concourse | Faregates, Station Agent |
| B2 | Counterclockwise | ← Line 4 to Dong'an Road |
| B2 | Island platform, doors open on the left |
| B2 | Clockwise | Line 4 to Luban Road → |
| B3 | Westbound | ← Line 12 towards Qixin Road (Middle Longhua Road) |
| B3 | Island platform, doors open on the left |
| B3 | Eastbound | Line 12 towards Jinhai Road (Jiashan Road) → |

== Gallery ==
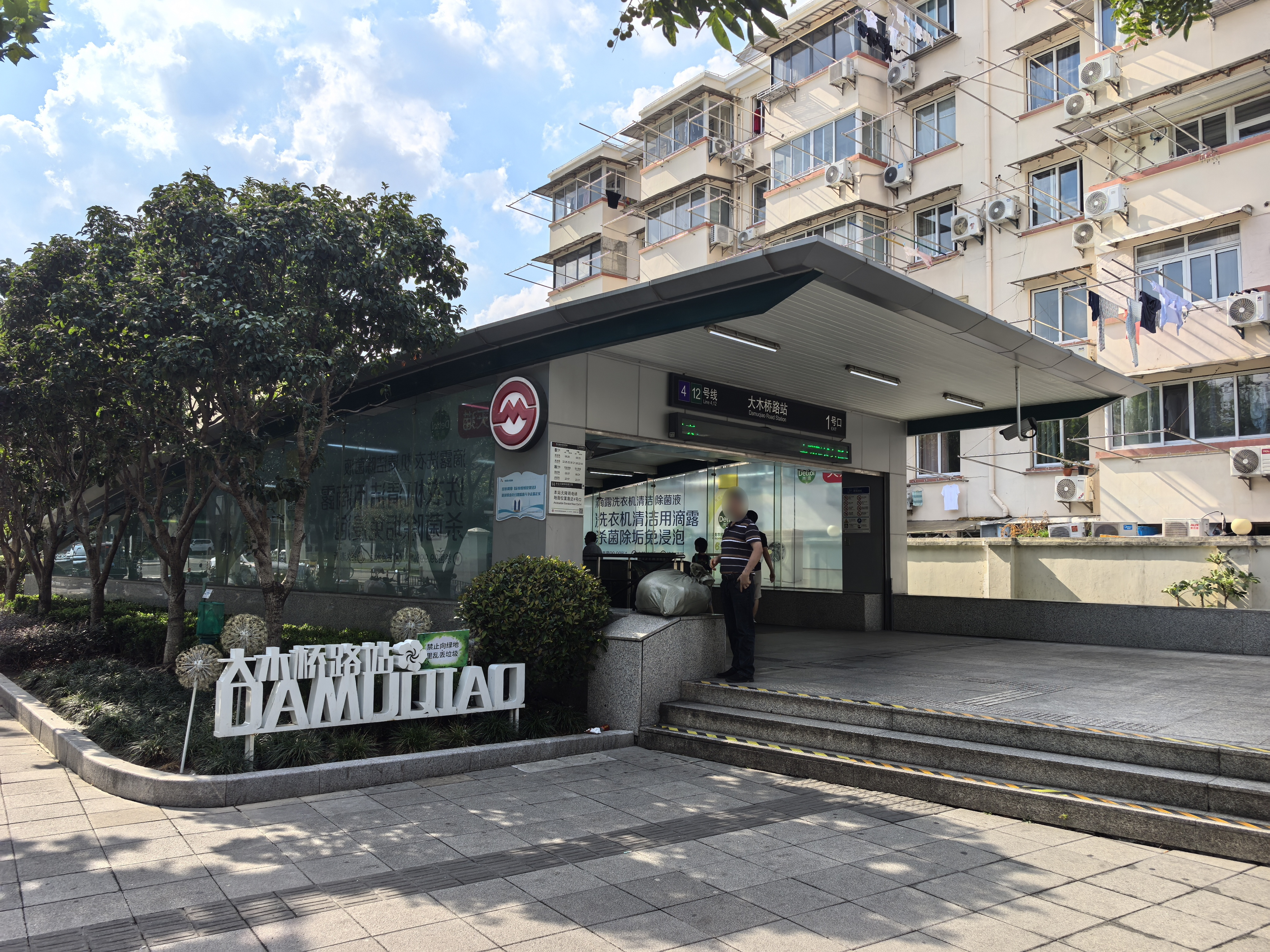
Exit 1

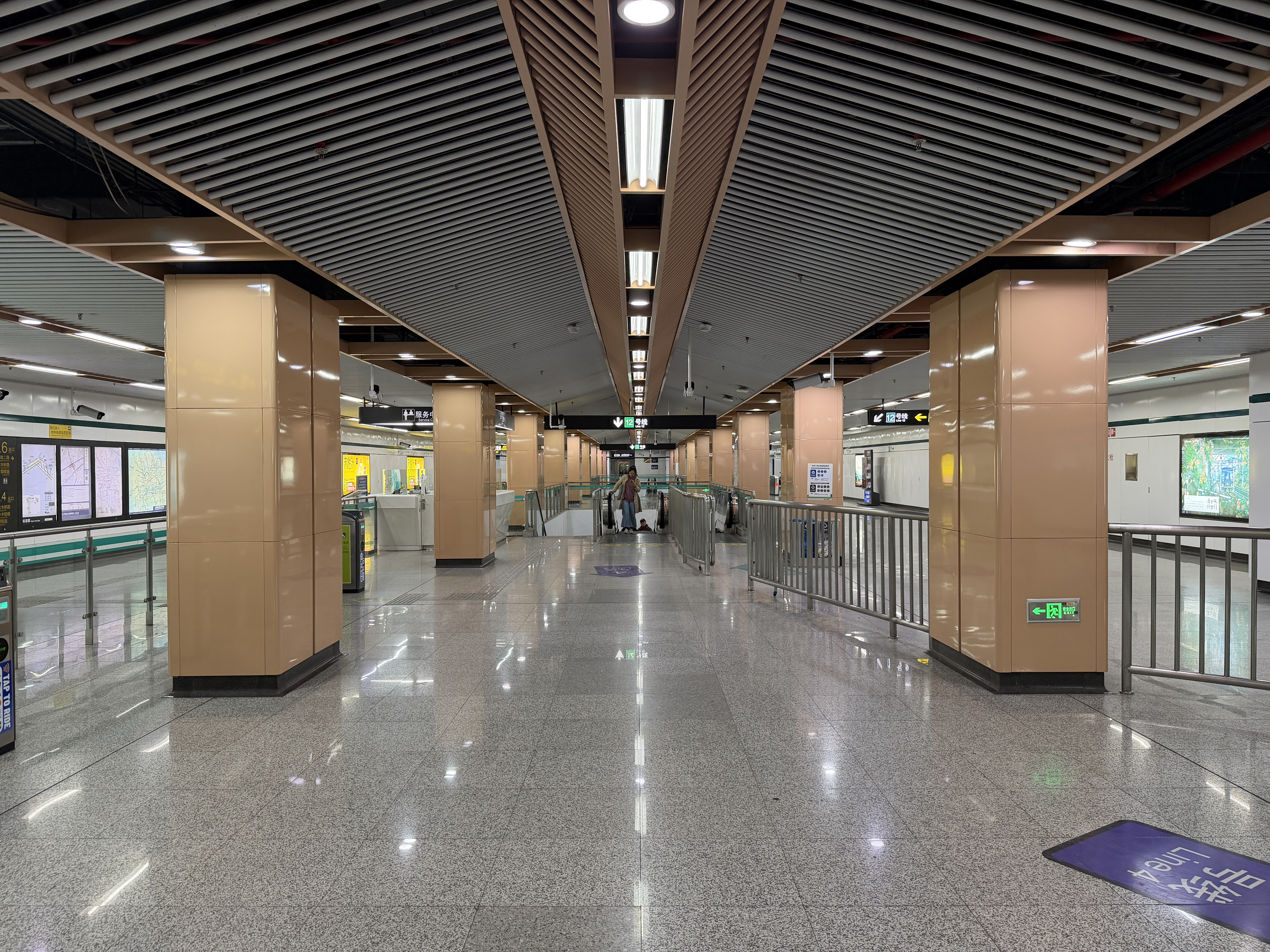
Line 12 concourse

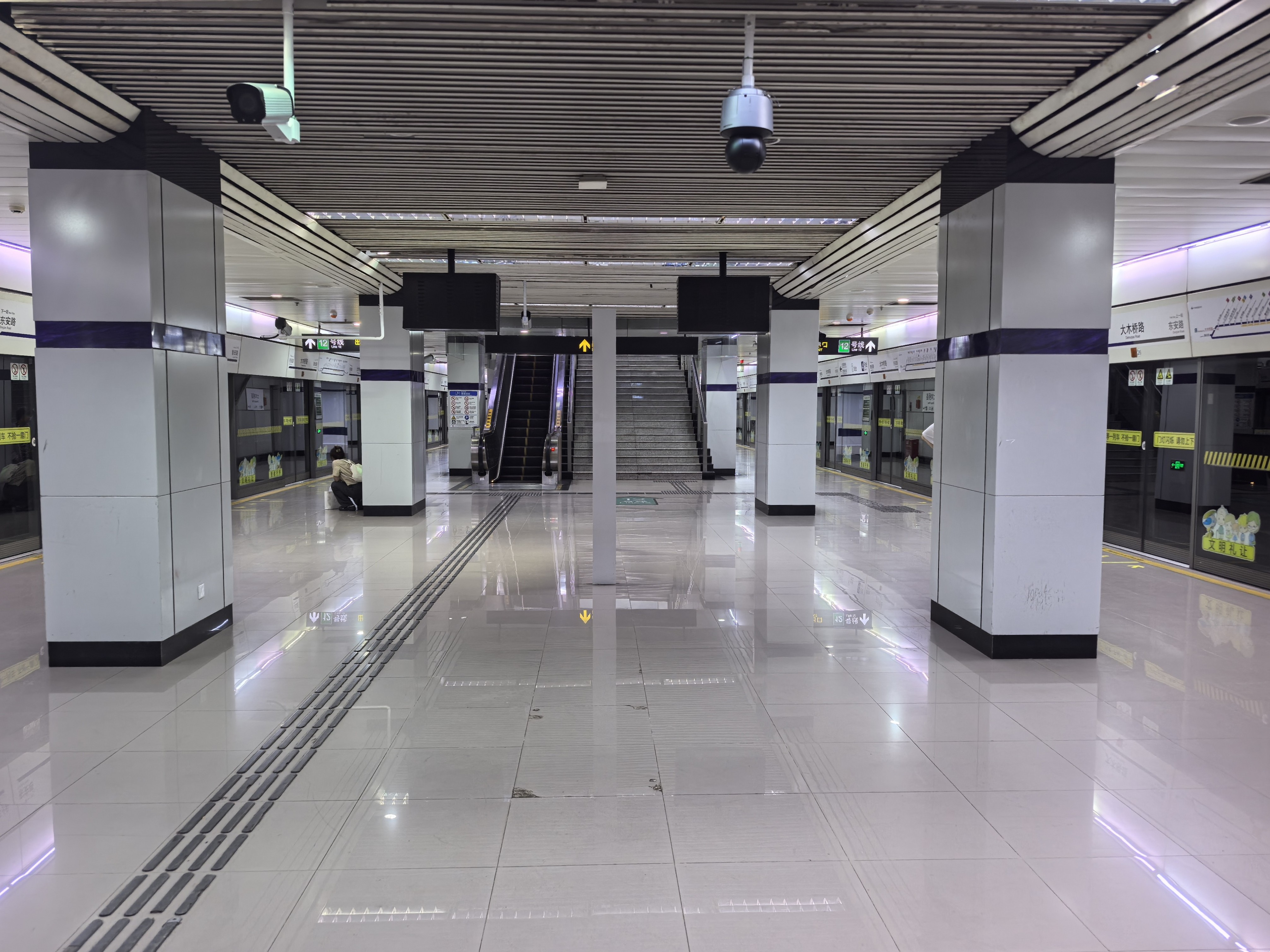
Line 4 platform

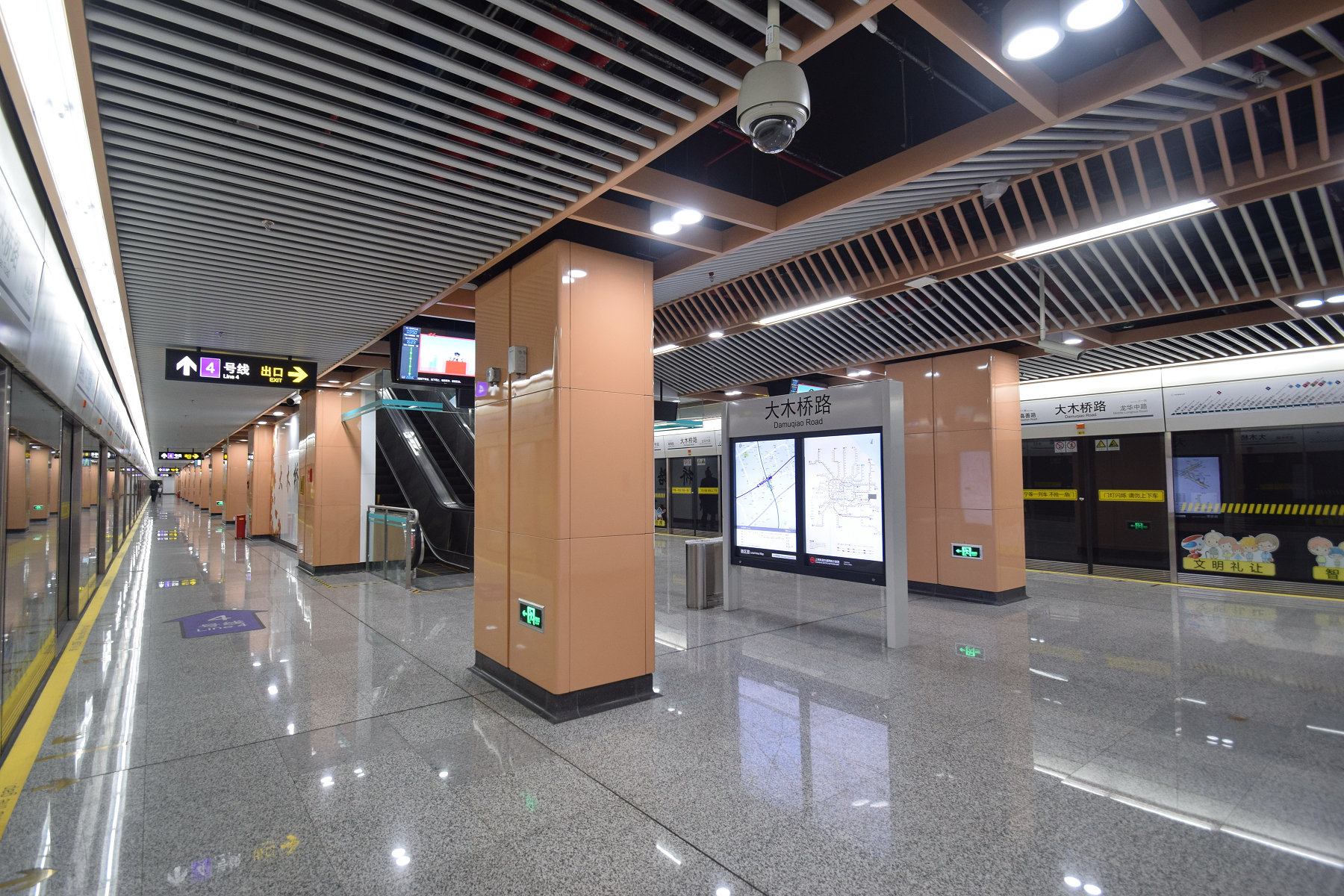
Line 12 platform
