= JF Books =

Independent bookstore in Dupont Circle, Washington, D.C.

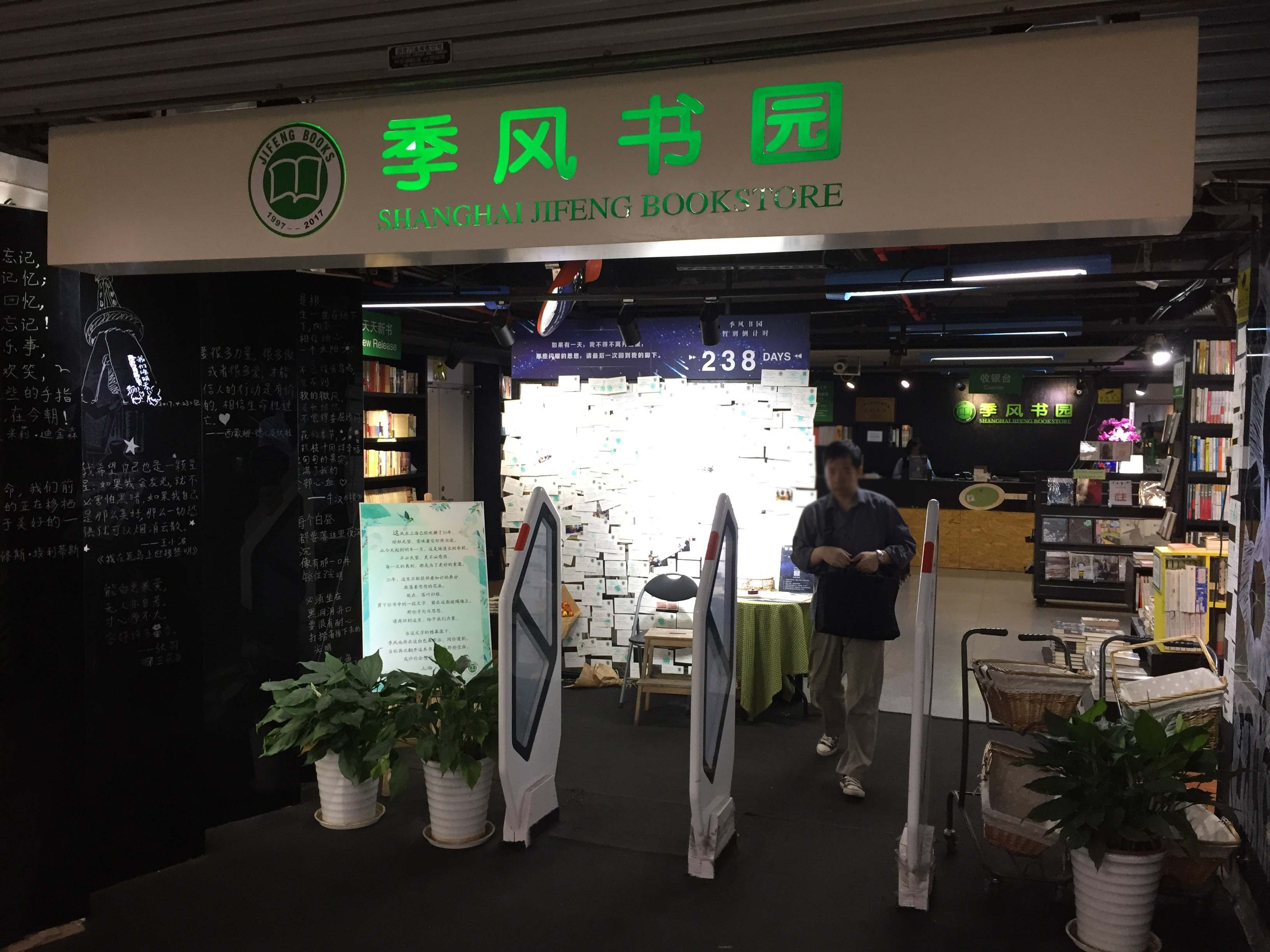
- The Shanghai Library station location in 2017
- Native name: 季风书园
- Formerly: Jifeng Bookstore
- Type: Independent bookstore
- Industry: Bookselling
- Founded: September 1, 2024
- Founder: Yu Miao
- Headquarters: Washington, D.C., United States
- Area served: Washington, D.C.
- Website: www.jfbooks.org

JF Books, formerly known as Jifeng Bookstore (Chinese: 季风书园; pinyin: jìfēng shū yuán), is an independent bookstore in the Dupont Circle neighborhood of Washington, D.C. It is the only Chinese-language bookstore in D.C. It was originally founded in 1997 in Shanghai.

== History ==
=== Origins in Shanghai ===
Jifeng Bookstore was founded in 1997 in Shanghai by Shanghai Academy of Social Sciences researcher Yan Bofei. Its first location was at South Shaanxi Road station. According to Yan, the bookstore's name, meaning "monsoon", referred to "the seasonal prevailing wind, changing according to the climate in an endless way, [which] resembles the fate of modern China". The bookstore grew a strong reputation among Shanghai's "liberal intelligentsia" for its works on "politics, philosophy, law and history," and the store eventually had eight locations across the city. In addition to selling books, the owners aimed to make the bookstore into a type of community and discussion space by hosting public lectures and other events.

In the 2000s, Jifeng struggled financially due to competition from online booksellers, and Shanghai authorities offered Yan financial assistance. In 2012, Yu Miao (Chinese: 于淼) bought the business from Yan. In 2013, the municipal authorities gave the store a subsidy for their brick-and-mortar locations. Beginning in 2014, Yu was told the bookstore would not receive further subsidies from the government. At times, Yu was pressured by authorities to cancel events due to the planned speaker or subject matter. The bookstore also downsized its other locations, following rent increases.

By 2017, the bookstore had only one location, at the Shanghai Library station. That year, the location's landlord, the government-owned Shanghai Library, notified Yu that his lease would not be extended. That same year, the bookstore released a special book in celebration of their 20th anniversary; however, the printing company recalled the book after authorities deemed the work an "illegal publication".

In January 2018, Yu was forced to close the bookstore's main Shanghai location after authorities refused to allow him to move the business elsewhere. According to Yu, authorities pressured local landlords not to rent to him. On its second to last day of operation, Yu was told the store's power and water would be shut off for maintenance, preventing the store from holding their planned final farewell party and movie night. However, customers still came to the shop, where they used their phone flashlights to look for books while an employee sang and played guitar. During the last night, patrons and staff sang several English-language protest songs, including Bob Dylan's "Blowin’ in the Wind" and "Do You Hear the People Sing?" from the musical Les Miserables.

Later in 2018, Yu emigrated with his family to the state of Florida in the United States.

=== Reopening in D.C. ===
Jifeng Bookstore reopened as JF Books on September 1, 2024, in Dupont Circle, Washington, D.C., where it neighbors another independent bookstore, Kramers. Yu's social media announcements of the store's opening were removed from the Chinese-owned app WeChat.

JF Books offers both English and Chinese-language books, including those from Hong Kong and Taiwan. It carries books banned in China and those published by Chinese academics. It regularly hosts lectures and discussions with Chinese intellectuals. One wall of the store is decorated with handwritten cards from patrons of the Shanghai location.
