= Zhaojiabang Road station =

Shanghai Metro interchange station

Zhaojiabang Road 肇嘉浜路
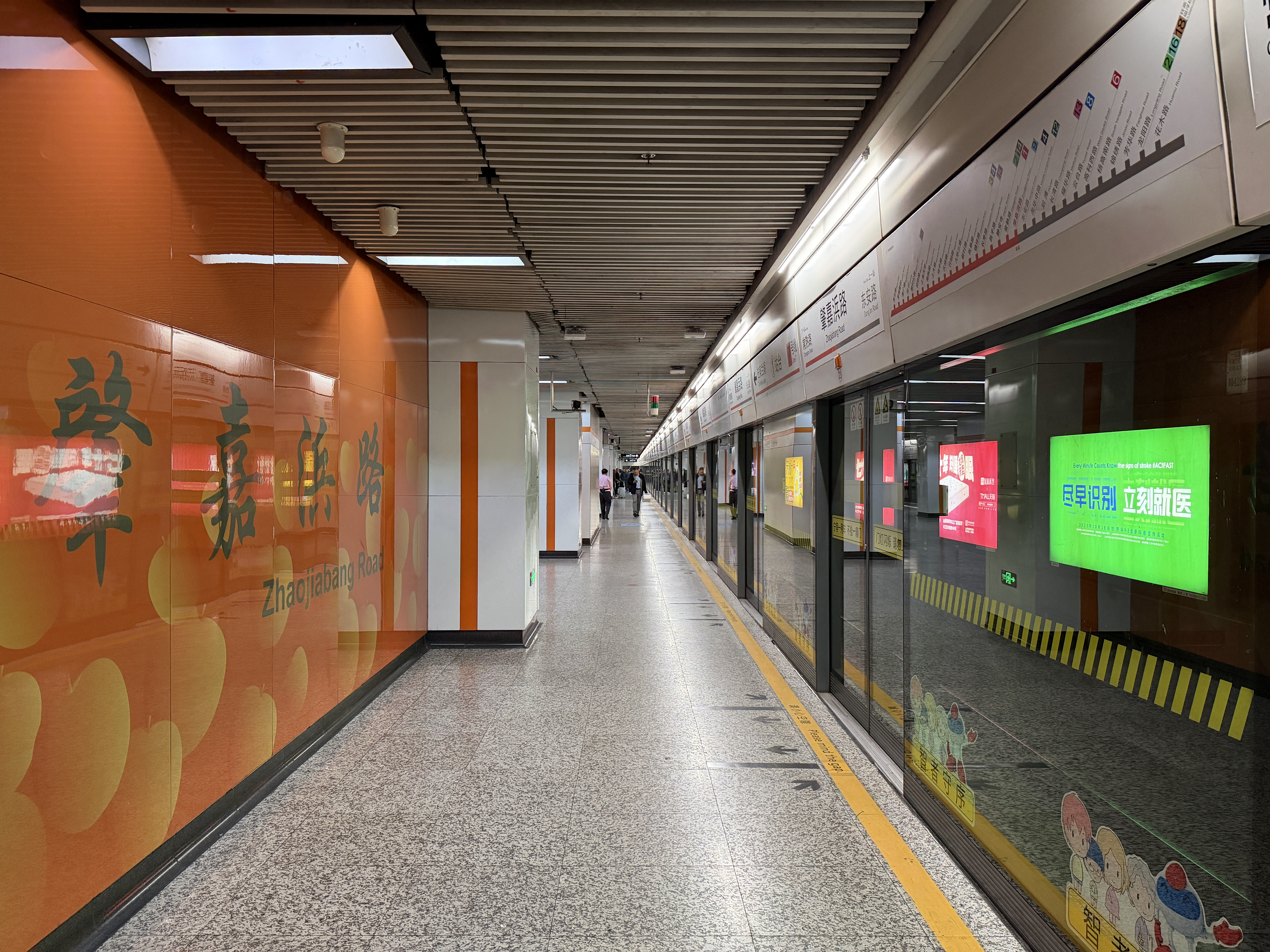
- Line 7 platform

General information
- Location: Zhaojiabang Road × Dong'an Road & South Wulumuqi Road; Xuhui District, Shanghai; China
- Coordinates: 31°12′5″N 121°26′42″E
- Operator: Shanghai No. 1/3 Metro Operation Co. Ltd.
- Lines: Line 7; Line 9
- Platforms: 4 (2 island platforms)
- Tracks: 4

Construction
- Structure type: Underground
- Accessible: Yes

History
- Opened: 5 December 2009 (Line 7); 31 December 2009 (Line 9)

Services
Preceding station	Shanghai Metro	Following station
Changshu Road towards Meilan Lake	Line 7	Dong'an Road towards Huamu Road
Xujiahui towards Shanghai Songjiang Railway Station	Line 9	Jiashan Road towards Caolu
Location
- Location within Shanghai

Zhaojiabang Road (Chinese: 肇嘉浜路; pinyin: Zhàojiǎbāng Lù) is an interchange station between lines 7 and 9 of the Shanghai Metro. It is located near the junction of Zhaojiabang Road and Wulumuqi Road in Xuhui District. The station began operation on 5 December 2009 with the start of operations on line 7 and became an interchange station on 31 December 2009 with the start of operations on line 9.

== Station layout ==
1F	Ground level	Exits
B1	Concourse	Tickets, Service Center
B2	Platform 3	← Line 9 towards Shanghai Songjiang Railway Station (Xujiahui)
B2	Island platform, doors open on the left
B2	Platform 4	Line 9 towards Caolu (Jiashan Road) →
B3	Platform 1	← Line 7 towards Meilan Lake (Changshu Road)
B3	Island platform, doors open on the left
B3	Platform 2	Line 7 towards Huamu Road (Dong'an Road) →

=== Entrances/exits ===
- 2: Zhaojiabang Road, Dong'an Road
- 3: Dong'an Road
- 4: Dong'an Road, Zhaojiabang Road, Pine City
