= Shanghai Library station =

Shanghai Metro station

Shanghai Library 上海图书馆
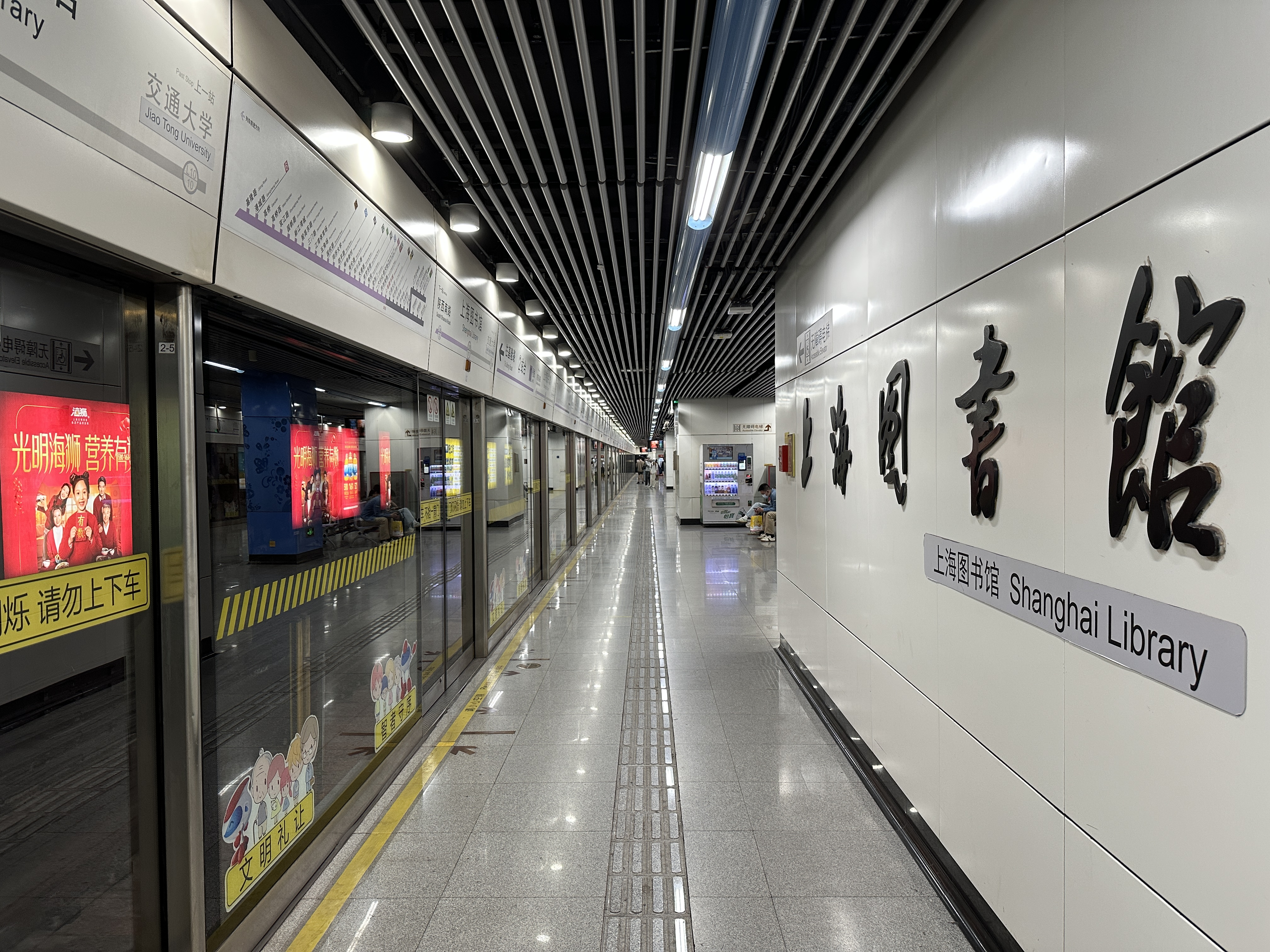
- Station platform

General information
- Location: Middle Huaihai Road and Gao'an Road; Xuhui District, Shanghai; China
- Coordinates: 31.209444°N 121.438611°E
- Operated by: Shanghai No. 1 Metro Operation Co. Ltd.
- Line: Line 10
- Platforms: 2 (1 island platform)
- Tracks: 2

Construction
- Structure type: Underground
- Accessible: Yes

Other information
- Station code: L10/11

History
- Opened: 10 April 2010

Services
Preceding station	Shanghai Metro	Following station
Jiao Tong University towards Hongqiao Railway Station or Hangzhong Road	Line 10	South Shaanxi Road towards Jilong Road
Location

Shanghai Library (simplified Chinese: 上海图书馆; traditional Chinese: 上海圖書館; pinyin: Shànghǎi Túshūguǎn) is a station on Line 10 of the Shanghai Metro. It began operation on 10 April 2010. It is named after the nearby Shanghai Library.

From 2013 to January 2018, the station was home to a branch of Jifeng Bookstore.
