= South Shaanxi Road station =

Shanghai Metro interchange station

South Shaanxi Road 陕西南路
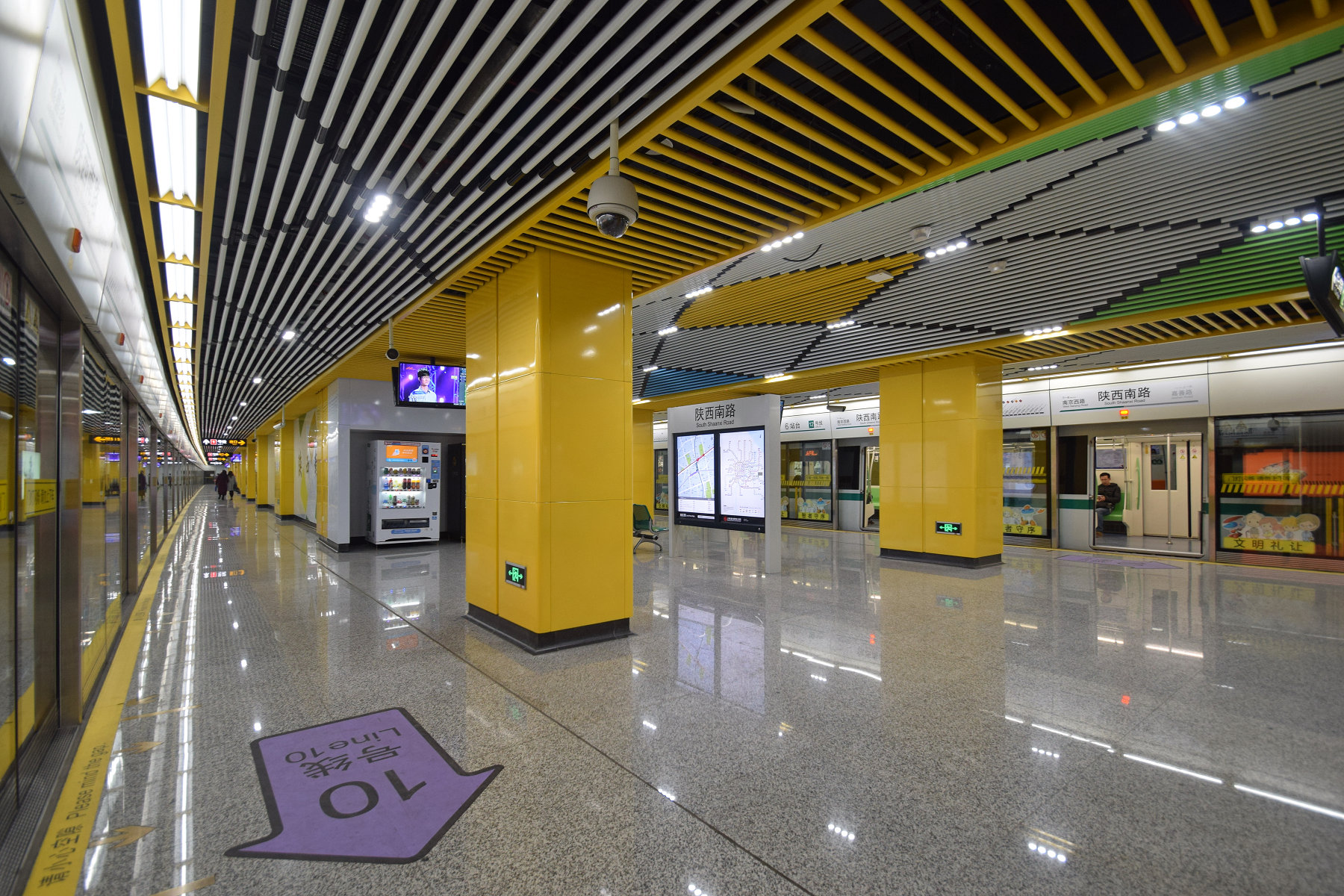
- Platform of Line 12

General information
- Location: Middle Huaihai Road and South Shaanxi Road; Huangpu District and Xuhui District, Shanghai; China
- Coordinates: 31°13′04″N 121°27′40″E
- Operator: Shanghai No. 1/4 Metro Operation Co. Ltd.
- Lines: Line 1; Line 10; Line 12
- Platforms: 6 (3 island platforms)
- Tracks: 6

Construction
- Structure type: Underground
- Accessible: Yes

Other information
- Station code: L10/12 (Line 10)

History
- Opened: 10 April 1995 (Line 1); 10 April 2010 (Line 10); 19 December 2015 (Line 12)

Services
Preceding station	Shanghai Metro	Following station
Site of the First CPC National Congress · South Huangpi Road towards Fujin Road	Line 1	Changshu Road towards Xinzhuang
Shanghai Library towards Hongqiao Railway Station or Hangzhong Road	Line 10	Site of the First CPC National Congress · Xintiandi towards Jilong Road
Jiashan Road towards Qixin Road	Line 12	West Nanjing Road towards Jinhai Road
Location
- Location within Shanghai

South Shaanxi Road (Chinese: 陕西南路; pinyin: Shǎnxī Nán Lù) is an interchange station between Lines 1, 10 and 12 of the Shanghai Metro. It is situated within the inner ring-road on the boundary between Huangpu District and Xuhui District.

The newest line that the station serves is Line 12 which opened on 19 December 2015. During the construction of Line 12, interchanging between lines 1 and 10 required exiting the station and crossing a road. Passengers using a Shanghai Public Transportation Card were not charged an extra fare as long as they re-entered the station within 30 minutes; those using single-ride tickets, however, had to purchase a new ticket.

IAPM, the station's primary shopping center, is situated at the intersection of the three lines and has direct subterranean access from lines 10 and 12. These entrances don't have metro exit numbers, so they are additional to the 10 numbered exits.

The station got its name from the road along which line 12 is lying, South Shaanxi Road. This is the South portion of Shaanxi Road, which in turn got its name from Shaanxi Province.

The Line 10 platform of the station contains a break room for train guards (who ride at the front of the fully driverless trains overseeing their operation). Line 10 trains change crews at this station.

== Places nearby ==
- IAPM Mall
- Huaihai Road, shopping street
- Xintiandi
- Xiangyang Park
- Jinjiang Hotel
- Sino-British College
- Shanghai Culture Plaza (former Canidrome site)
- Shanghai Museum of Arts and Crafts
- Yongkang Road which used to be the expats' favorite bar street.

== Gallery ==
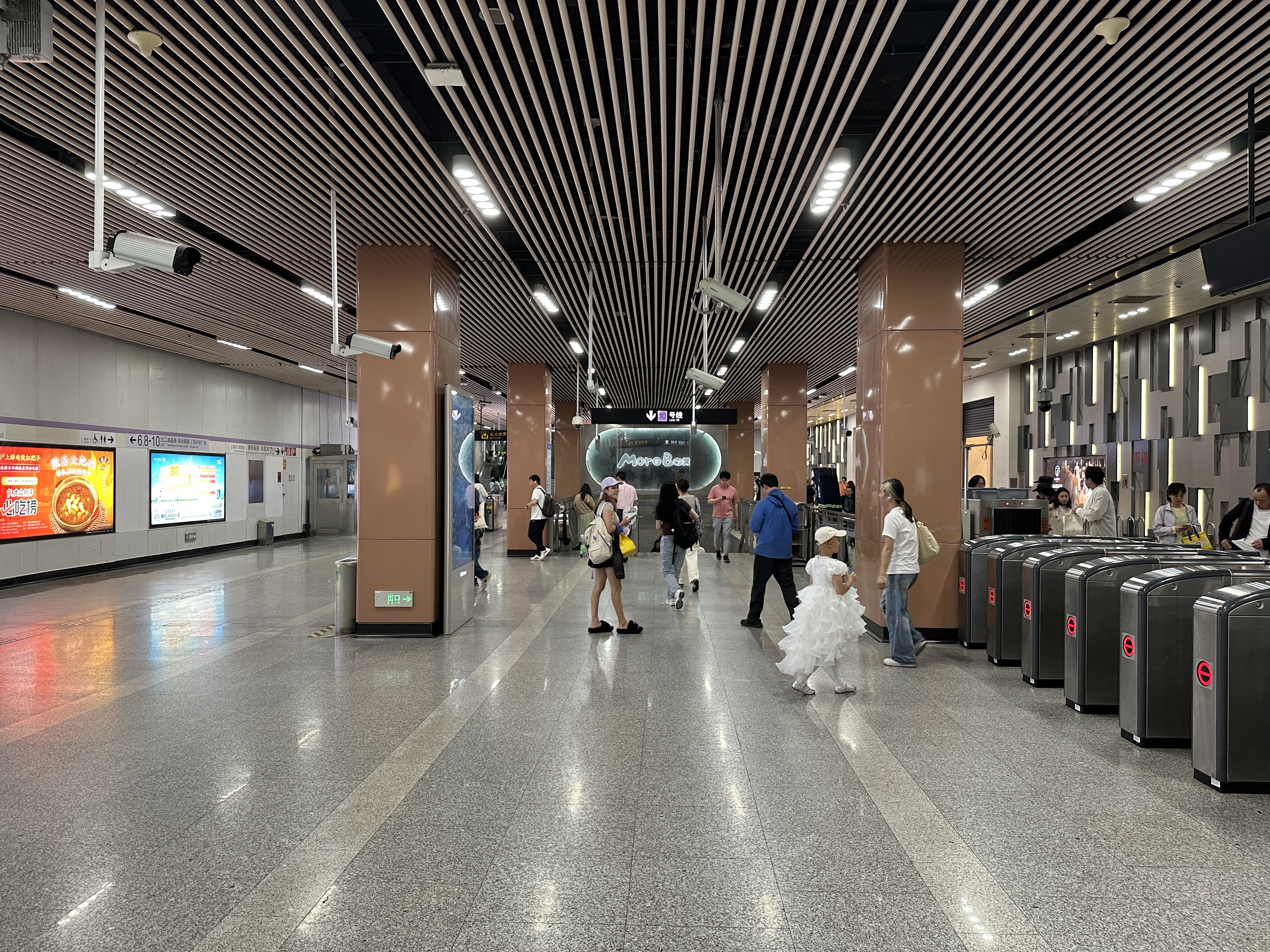
Concourse of Line 10

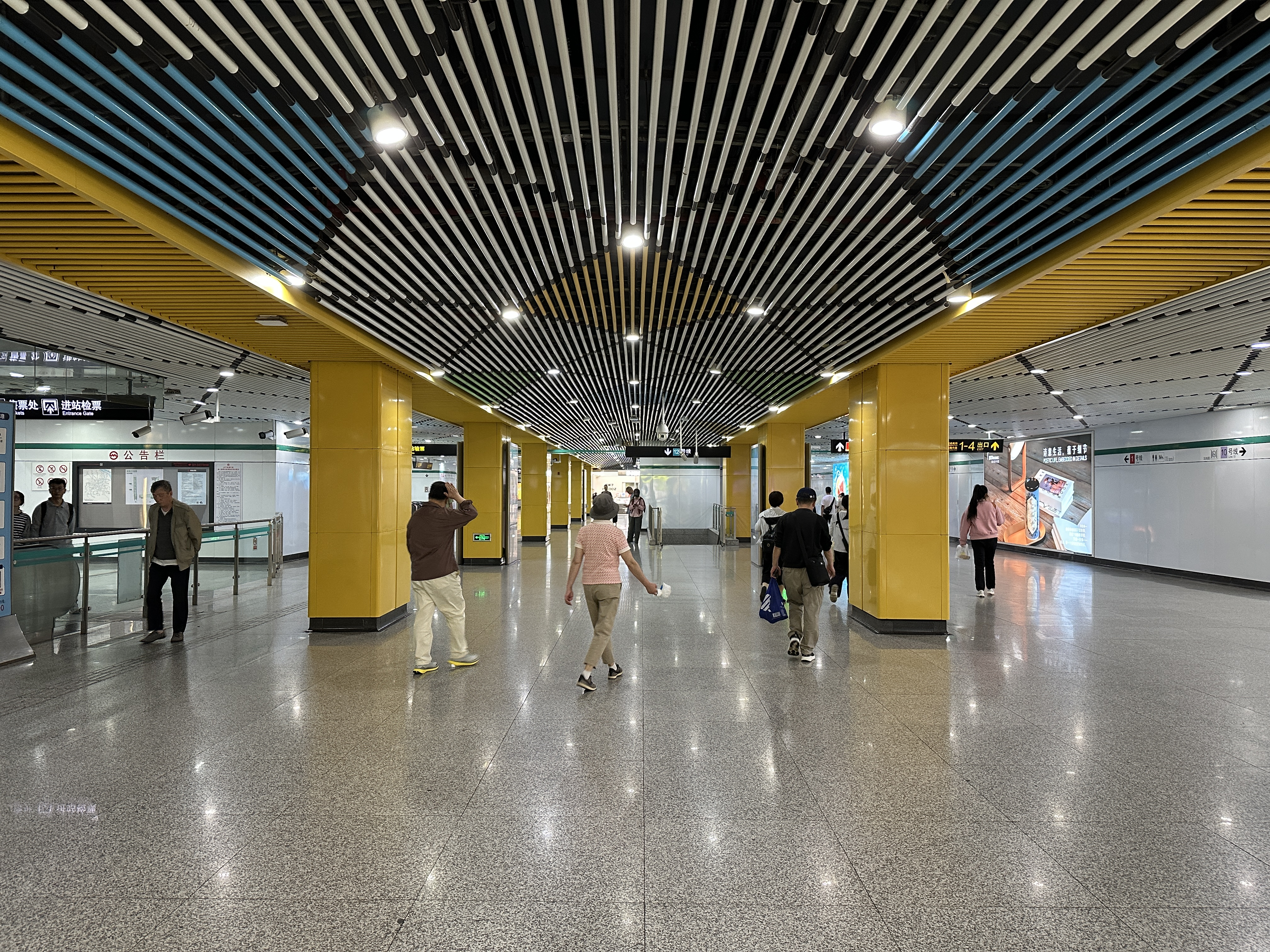
Concourse of Line 12

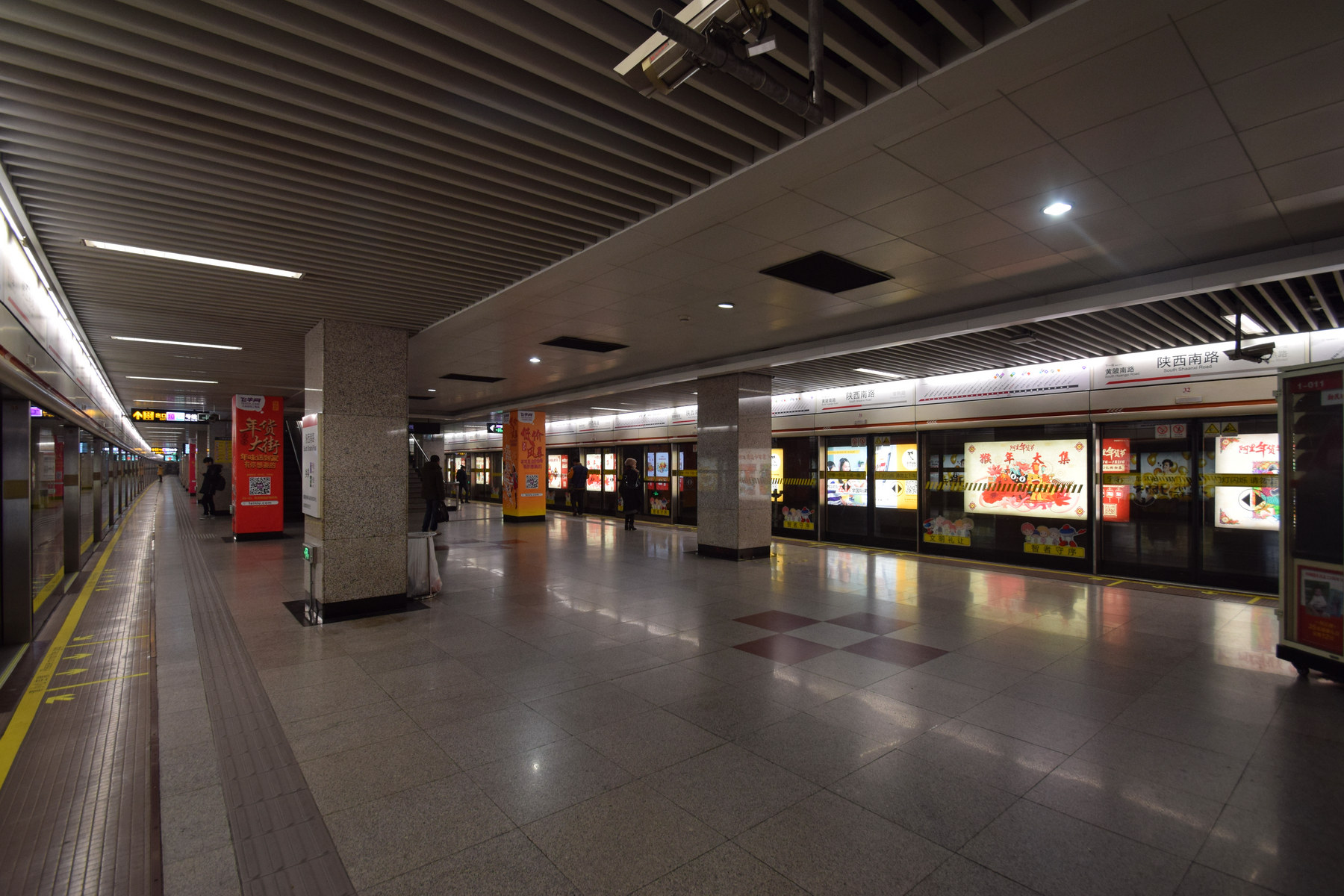
Platform of Line 1

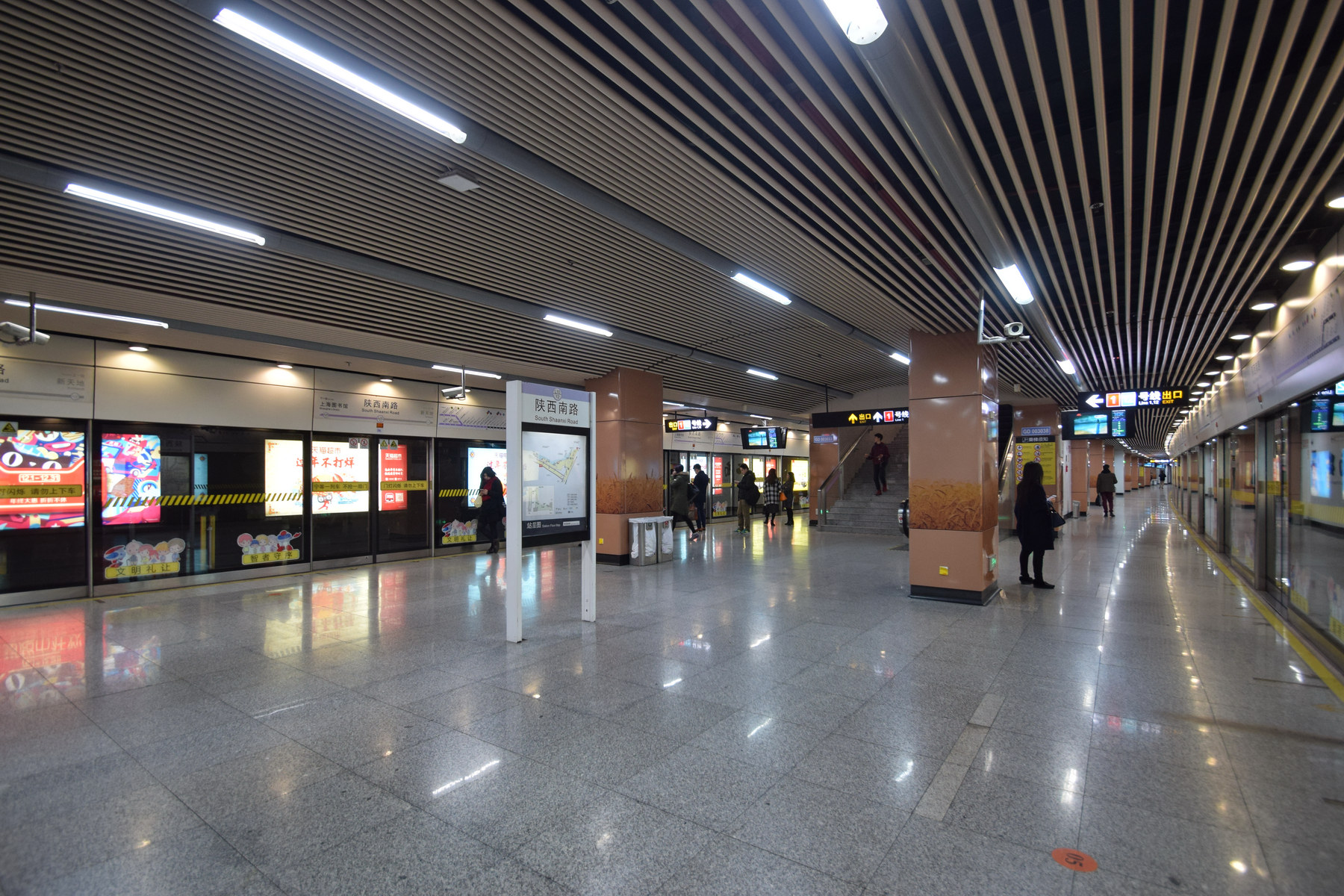
Platform of Line 10

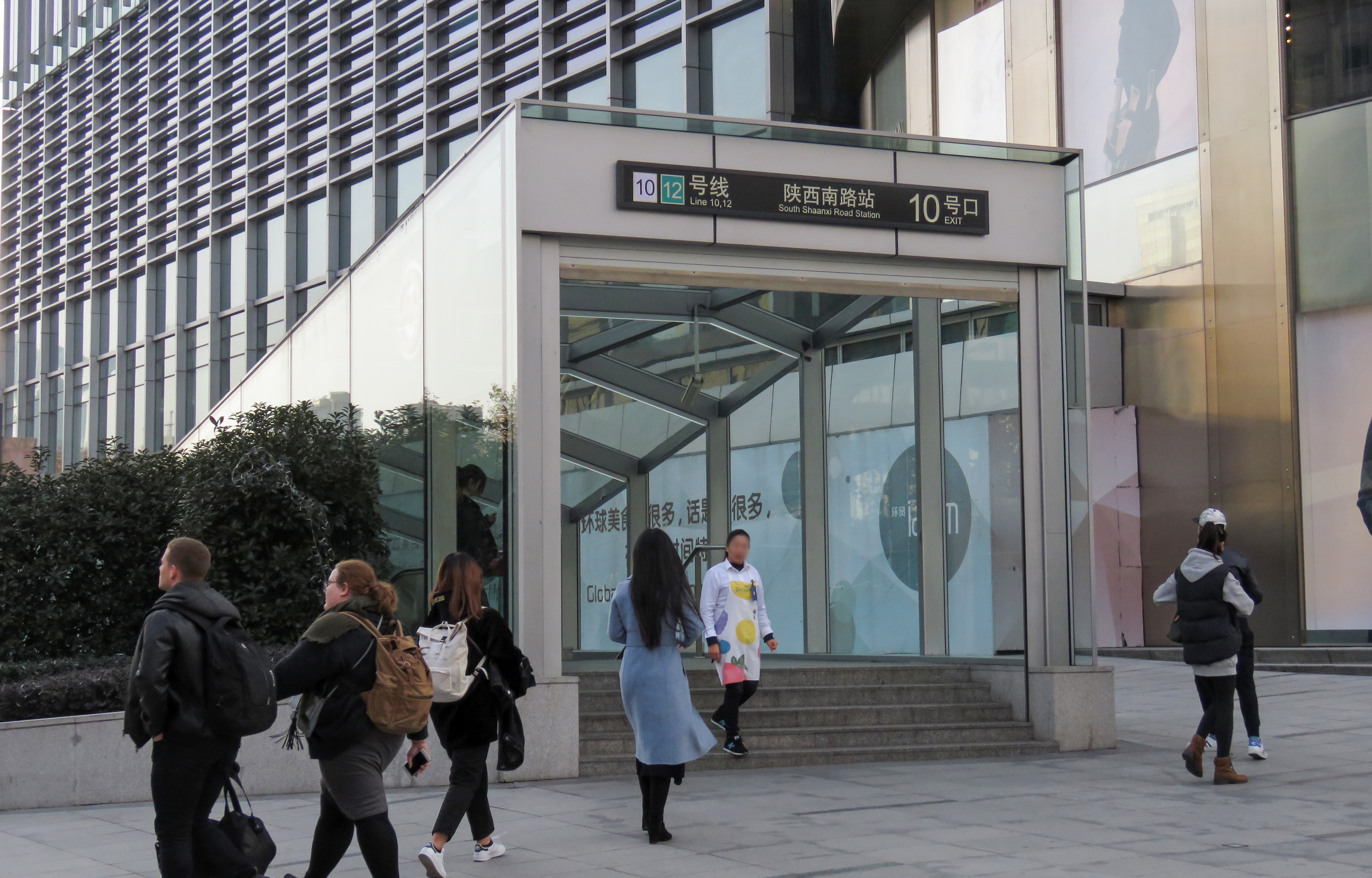
Exit 10 in 2018

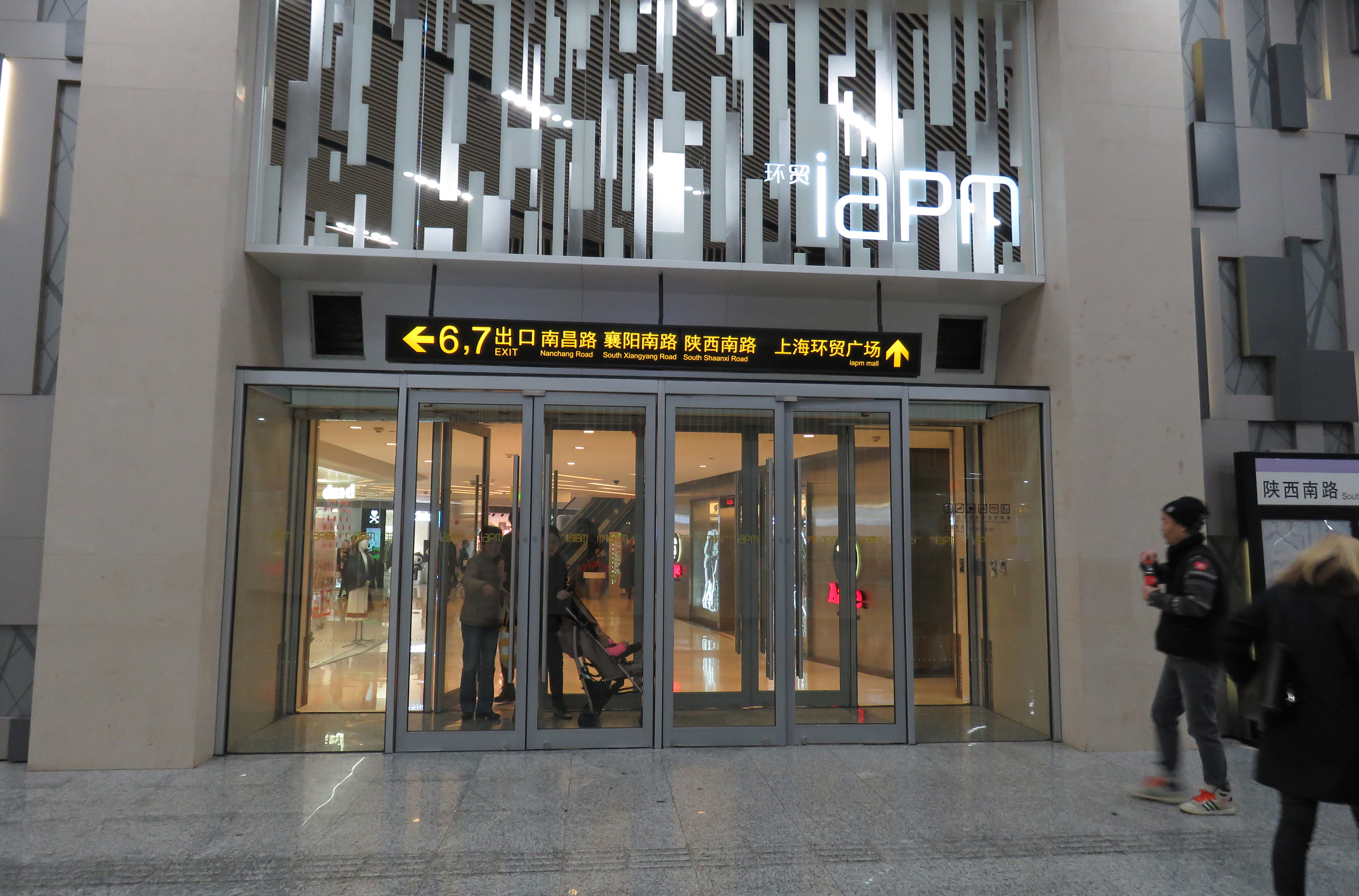
Exit to IAPM Mall
