= Jiashan Road station =

Metro station in Shanghai, China

Jiashan Road 嘉善路
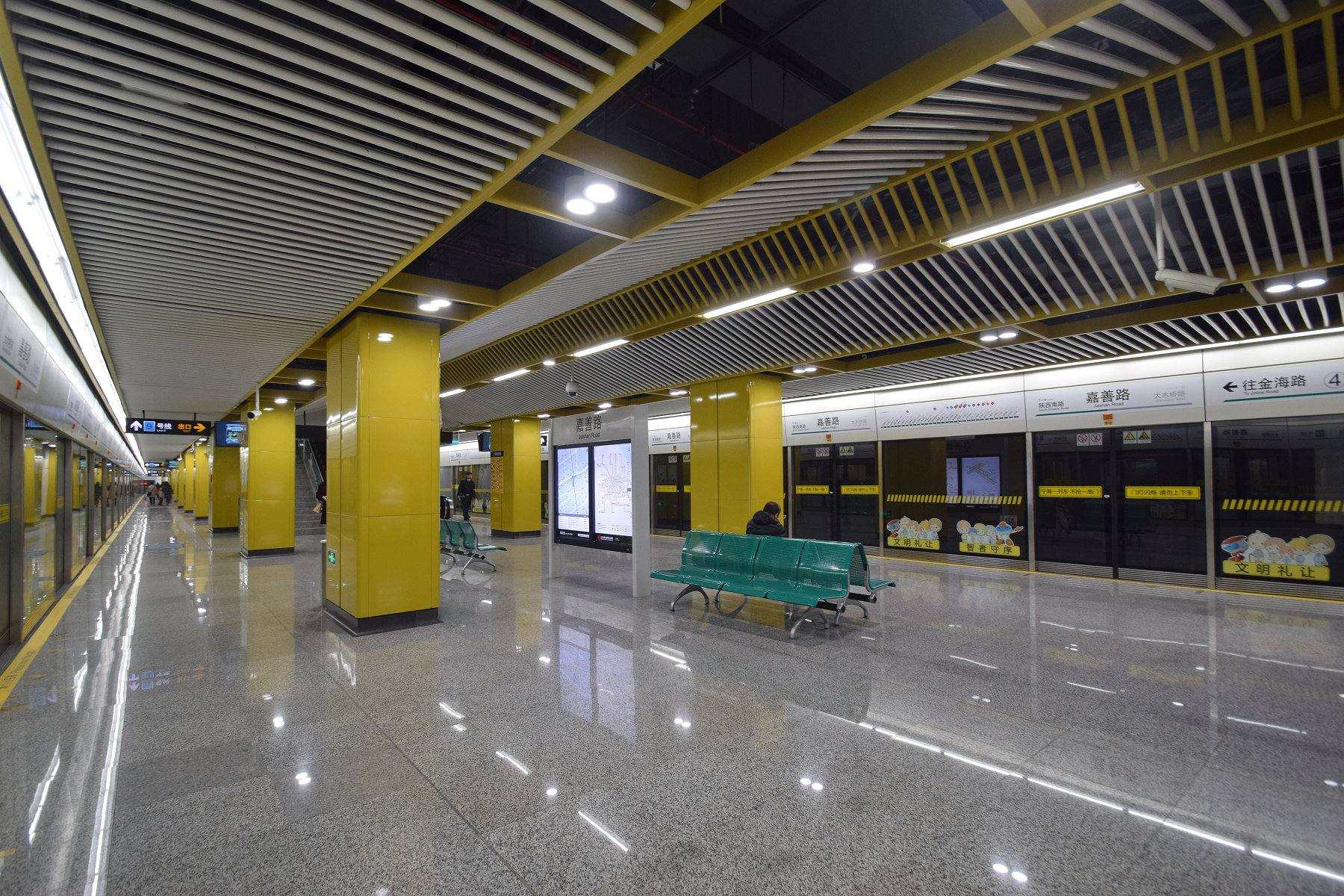
- Platform of Line 12

General information
- Location: Zhaojiabang Road and Jiashan Road (嘉善路); Xuhui District, Shanghai; China
- Coordinates: 31.2027°N 121.461°E
- Operator: Shanghai No. 1/4 Metro Operation Co. Ltd.
- Lines: Line 9; Line 12
- Platforms: 4 (2 island platforms)
- Tracks: 4

Construction
- Structure type: Underground
- Accessible: Yes

History
- Opened: 31 December 2009 (Line 9); 19 December 2015 (Line 12)

Services
Preceding station	Shanghai Metro	Following station
Zhaojiabang Road towards Shanghai Songjiang Railway Station	Line 9	Dapuqiao towards Caolu
Damuqiao Road towards Qixin Road	Line 12	South Shaanxi Road towards Jinhai Road
Location
- Location within Shanghai

Jiashan Road (Chinese: 嘉善路; pinyin: Jiāshàn Lù) is an interchange station between Lines 9 and 12 of the Shanghai Metro. It is located near the intersection of Zhaojiabang Road and Damuqiao Road. The station came into operation on 31 December 2009 with the opening of line 9. It became an interchange station on 19 December 2015 with the opening of line 12.

== Station layout ==
1F	Ground level	Exits
B1	Concourse	Tickets, Service Center
B2	Platform 1	← Line 9 towards Shanghai Songjiang Railway Station (Zhaojiabang Road)
B2	Island platform, doors open on the left
B2	Platform 2	Line 9 towards Caolu (Dapuqiao) →
B3	Platform 3	← Line 12 towards Qixin Road (Damuqiao Road)
B3	Island platform, doors open on the left
B3	Platform 4	Line 12 towards Jinhai Road (South Shaanxi Road) →

=== Entrances/exits ===
- 2: Zhaojiabang Road, Damuqiao Road
- 4: Damuqiao Road, Yixueyuan Road
- 5: Zhaojiabang Road, Damuqiao Road
- 6: Damuqiao Road, Zhaojiabang Road
