= Dong'an Road station =

Shanghai Metro interchange station

Dong'an Road 东安路
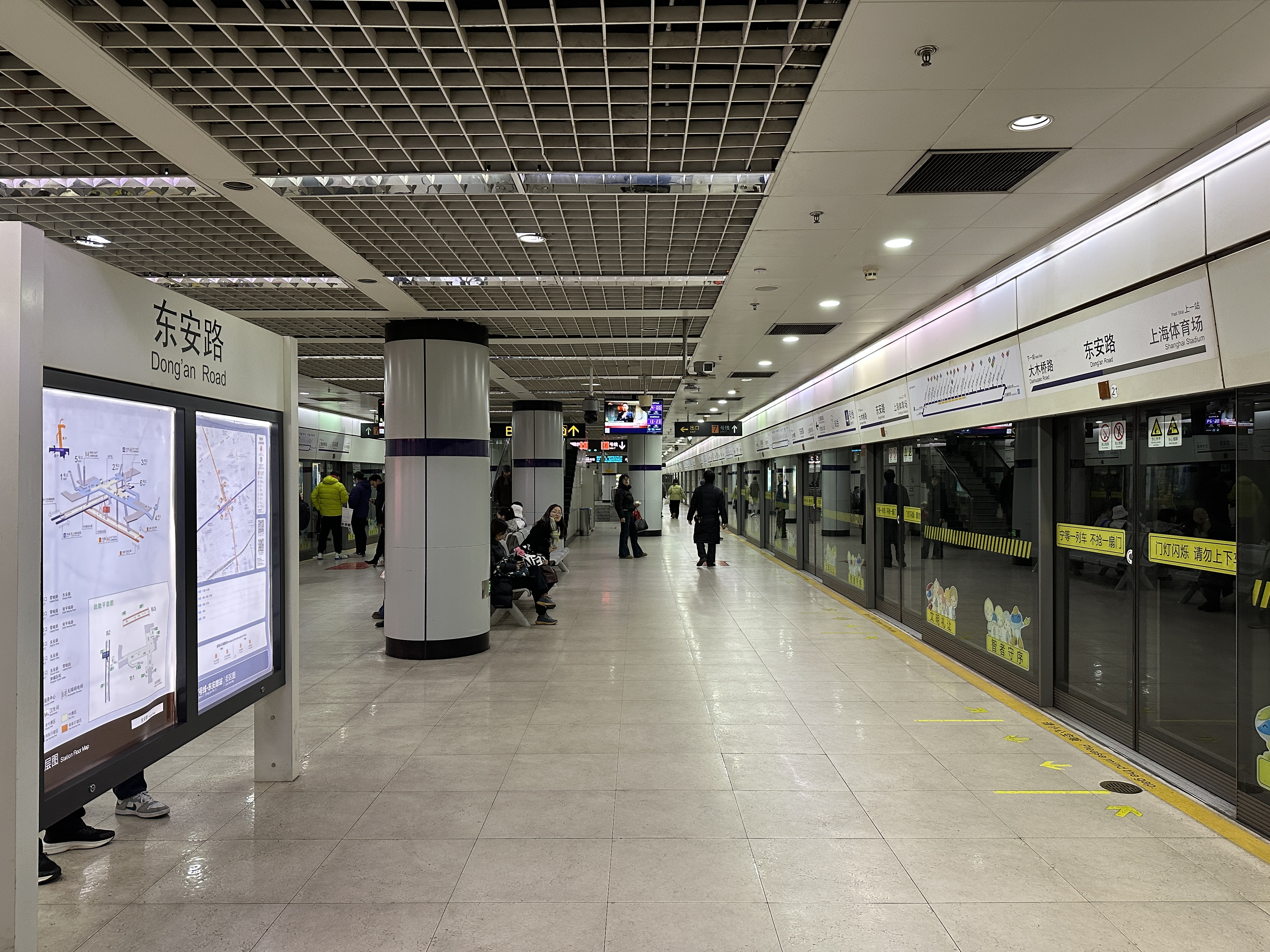
- Line 4 platform

General information
- Location: Dong'an Road and Lingling Road (零陵路); Xuhui District, Shanghai; China
- Coordinates: 31°11′27″N 121°27′18″E
- Operator: Shanghai No. 3 Metro Operation Co. Ltd.
- Lines: Line 4; Line 7
- Platforms: 4 (2 island platforms)
- Tracks: 4

Construction
- Structure type: Underground
- Accessible: Yes

History
- Opened: 31 December 2005; 20 years ago (Line 4); 5 December 2009; 16 years ago (Line 7)

Services
Preceding station	Shanghai Metro	Following station
Shanghai Stadium Clockwise	Line 4	Damuqiao Road Counter-clockwise
Zhaojiabang Road towards Meilan Lake	Line 7	Middle Longhua Road towards Huamu Road
Location
- Location within Shanghai

Dong'an Road (simplified Chinese: 东安路; traditional Chinese: 東安路; pinyin: Dōng'ān Lù) is a station on the Shanghai Metro. The station serves lines 4 and 7. Service began on Line 4 at this station on 31 December 2005, while the interchange with Line 7 opened on 5 December 2009 with the initial section of that line from Shanghai University to Huamu Road.

== Station Layout ==
G	Entrances and Exits	Exits 1-5
B1	Line 4 Concourse	Faregates, Station Agent
B1	Line 7 Concourse	Faregates, Station Agent
B2	Counterclockwise	← Line 4 to Shanghai Stadium
B2	Island platform, doors open on the left
B2	Clockwise	Line 4 to Damuqiao Road →
B3	Northbound	← Line 7 towards Meilan Lake (Zhaojiabang Road)
B3	Island platform, doors open on the left
B3	Southbound	Line 7 towards Huamu Road (Middle Longhua Road) →

== Places nearby ==
- Zhongshan Hospital
- Cancer Hospital
