= Huajing =

Huajing 華涇鎮
- Town
- Location within Shanghai
- Coordinates: 31°7′10″N 121°27′7″E
- Country: China
- Municipality: Shanghai
- District: Xuhui

Area
  - Total: 8.04 km^{2} (3.10 sq mi)

Population (2010)
  - Total: 67,415
  - Density: 8,380/km^{2} (21,700/sq mi)
- Time zone: UTC+8 (China Standard)

Huajing (simplified Chinese: 华泾镇; traditional Chinese: 華涇鎮; pinyin: Huájīng Zhèn; Wugniu: gho^{2} cin^{1} tsen^{5}) is a town located in the Xuhui District of Shanghai.
