= Shanghai Southwest Weiyu Middle School =

Private school in Shanghai, China

Coordinates: 31°11′N 121°26′E

- Chinese: 上海市西南位育中学

Information
- Established: 1993; 33 years ago

Shanghai Southwest Weiyu Middle School (Chinese: 上海市西南位育中学; pinyin: Shànghǎishì Xīnán Wèiyù Zhōngxué) is a private school situated on Yishan Road in Xuhui District, Shanghai, PRC. Founded in 1993, it is the first large-scale private middle school in Mainland China since the adoption of the reform and opening up. The school is sponsored by Shanghai Xujiahui Department Group Store Company Ltd.

The chairman of the school is Gao Yunsong. The founder of the school was Zhuang Zhongwen. The headmaster is Zhang Jianzhong.

The school has three campuses with sixty classes and almost three thousand students. It has computer rooms, libraries and music classrooms. The school is called Shanghai Exemplary Entity for Physical Education, Shanghai Exemplary Entity for Moral Education, Shanghai Model School for Code of Conduct, Shanghai Experimental Base for Science and Technology Education and Shanghai Exemplary Entity for Spiritual Civilization. In April 2005, it became the first middle school to pass the Certification of the International and Trans-Regional Accreditation (CITA). In October 2005, it was approved as the experimental and exemplary high school in Xuhui District.

The Overseas Students Department was established in 2006, and since then there have been overseas students from about twelve countries including the United States, France, Japan and Korea.
