= Shanghai Corniche =

Area of Shanghai, China

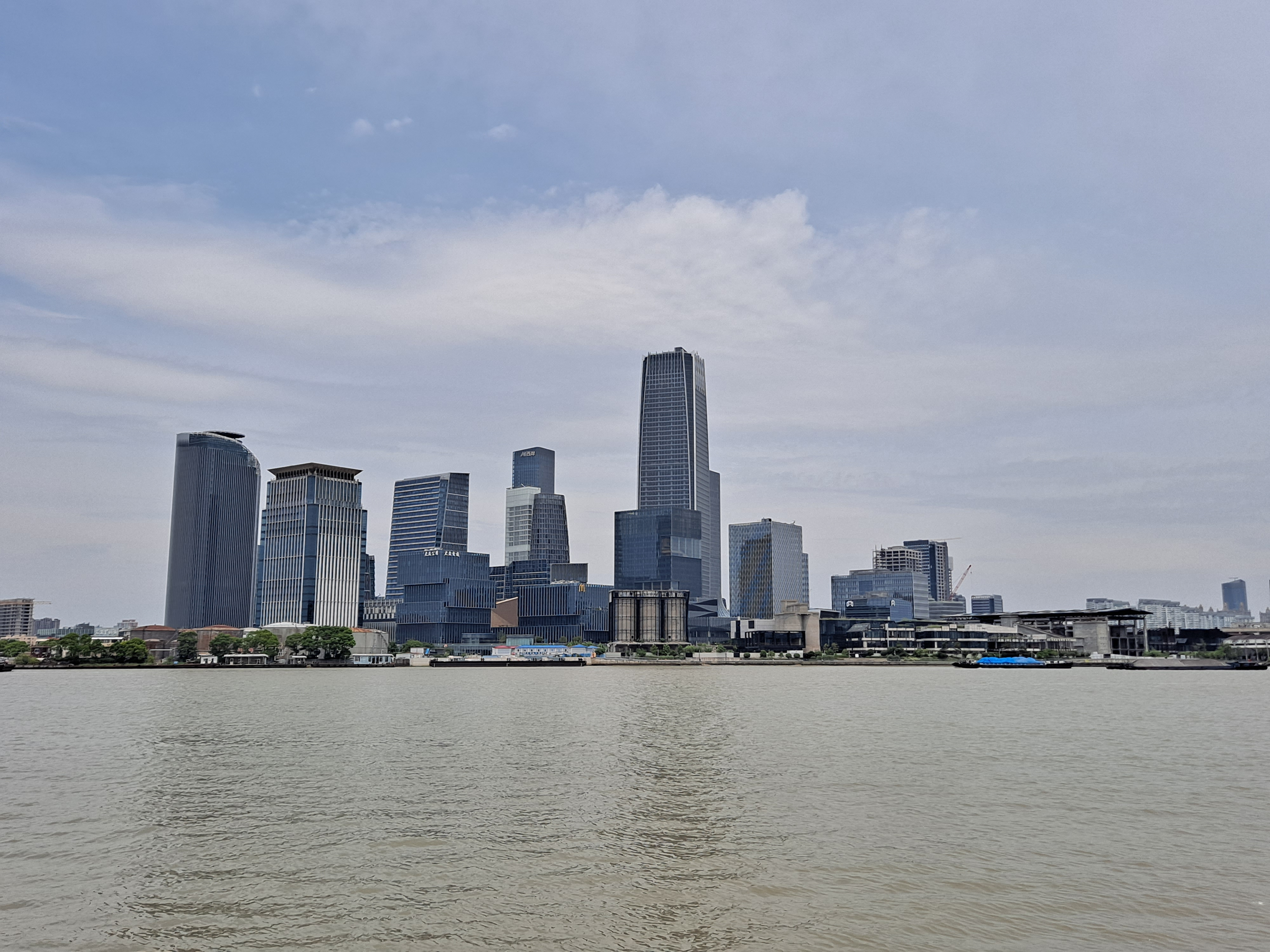
Xuhui Waterfront from Qiantan

The Shanghai West Bund - Corniche is the riverside of the Shanghai 'West Bund' redevelopment area in Shanghai along a formerly industrial 8.5 kilometre frontage on the northern bank of the Huangpu River in Shanghai's Xuhui District. The regeneration project for the area began in 2003. The redevelopment is part of a re-urbanisation of the Xuhui river frontage as part of a broader strategy for the banks of the Huangpu River as it passes through the centre of the city, including the Bund, Pudong and the site for the World Expo. The municipality held an international design competition, won in 2008 by Peter Verity the international urbanist and architect of PDRc Ltd for which he was awarded the special Shanghai Expo Achievement Award.

The plan as proposed by Verity calls for a mixed-use development with residential, employment, commercial, culture and recreation areas. A primary objective to re-establish the natural ecology of the area through urban greening and the re-establishment of wildlife habitats. The Shanghai Corniche forms part of Shanghai's Expo legacy and will be a pedestrian oriented area of rich urban places with a low energy public transport systems and low energy and low carbon buildings. The realisation of the riverfront public realm was recognised by the Government of China as model of best urban design practice.

== Sources ==
- Jeremie Descamps, West Bund, Tale of Urban China, Modu Magazine, 08/06/2012
