= Yunjin Road station =

Shanghai Metro station

Yunjin Road 云锦路
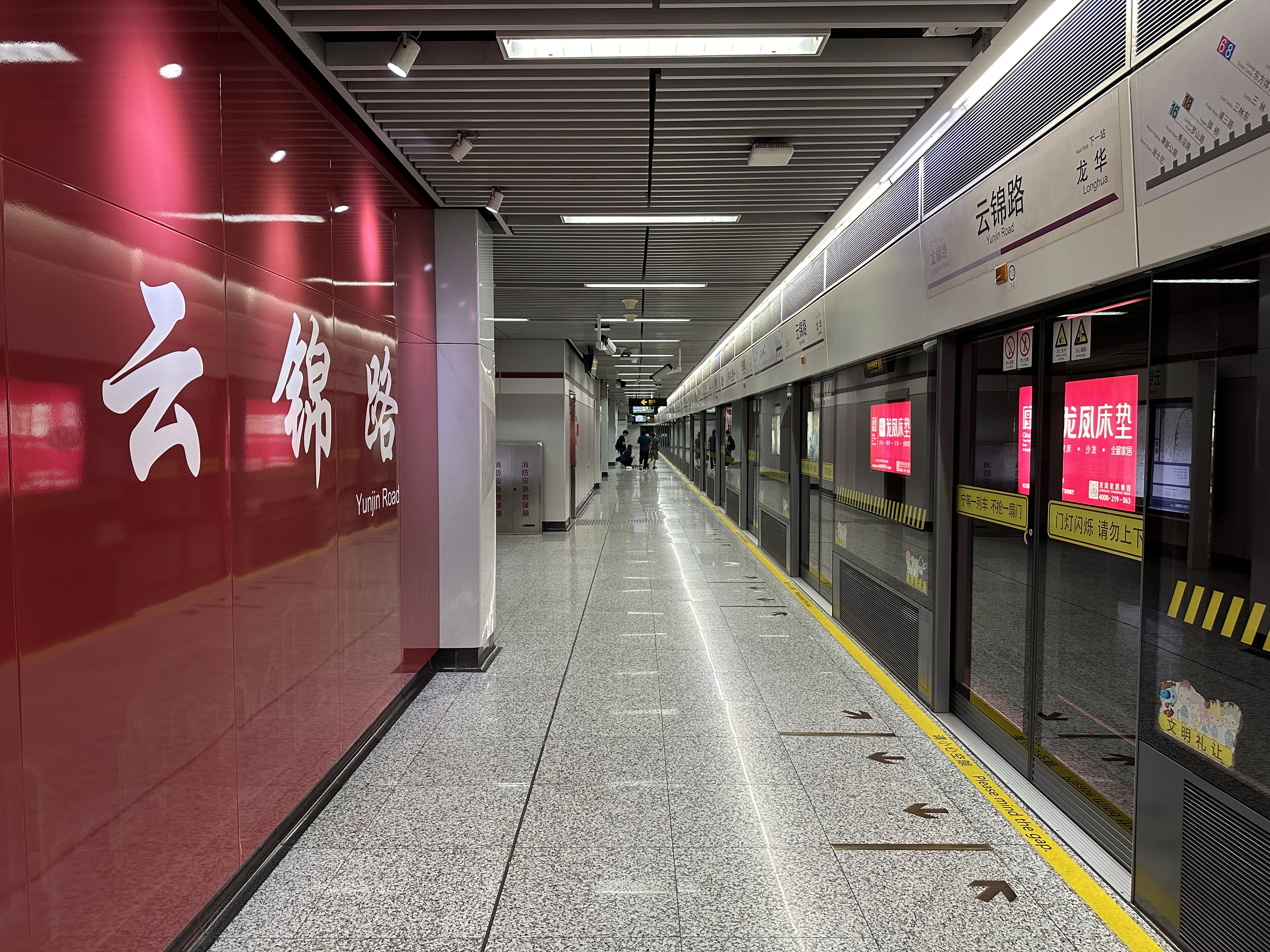
- Platform towards North Jiading or Huaqiao

General information
- Location: Yunjin Road (云锦路); Longhua District, Xuhui District, Shanghai; China
- Coordinates: 31°09′59″N 121°27′31″E
- System: Shanghai metro station
- Operator: Shanghai No. 2 Metro Operation Co. Ltd.
- Line: Line 11
- Platforms: 2 (2 side platforms)
- Tracks: 2

Construction
- Structure type: Underground
- Accessible: Yes

History
- Opened: August 31, 2013

Services
Preceding station	Shanghai Metro	Following station
Longhua towards North Jiading or Huaqiao	Line 11	Longyao Road towards Disney Resort
Location
- Location within Shanghai

Yunjin Road (simplified Chinese: 云锦路; traditional Chinese: 雲錦路; pinyin: Yúnjǐn Lù) is a station on Line 11 of the Shanghai Metro, which opened on August 31, 2013. The station is located on Yunjin Road in Longhua District, Xuhui District, Shanghai.

== Station layout ==
Yunjin Road has two levels: a concourse, and two side platforms for Line 11.

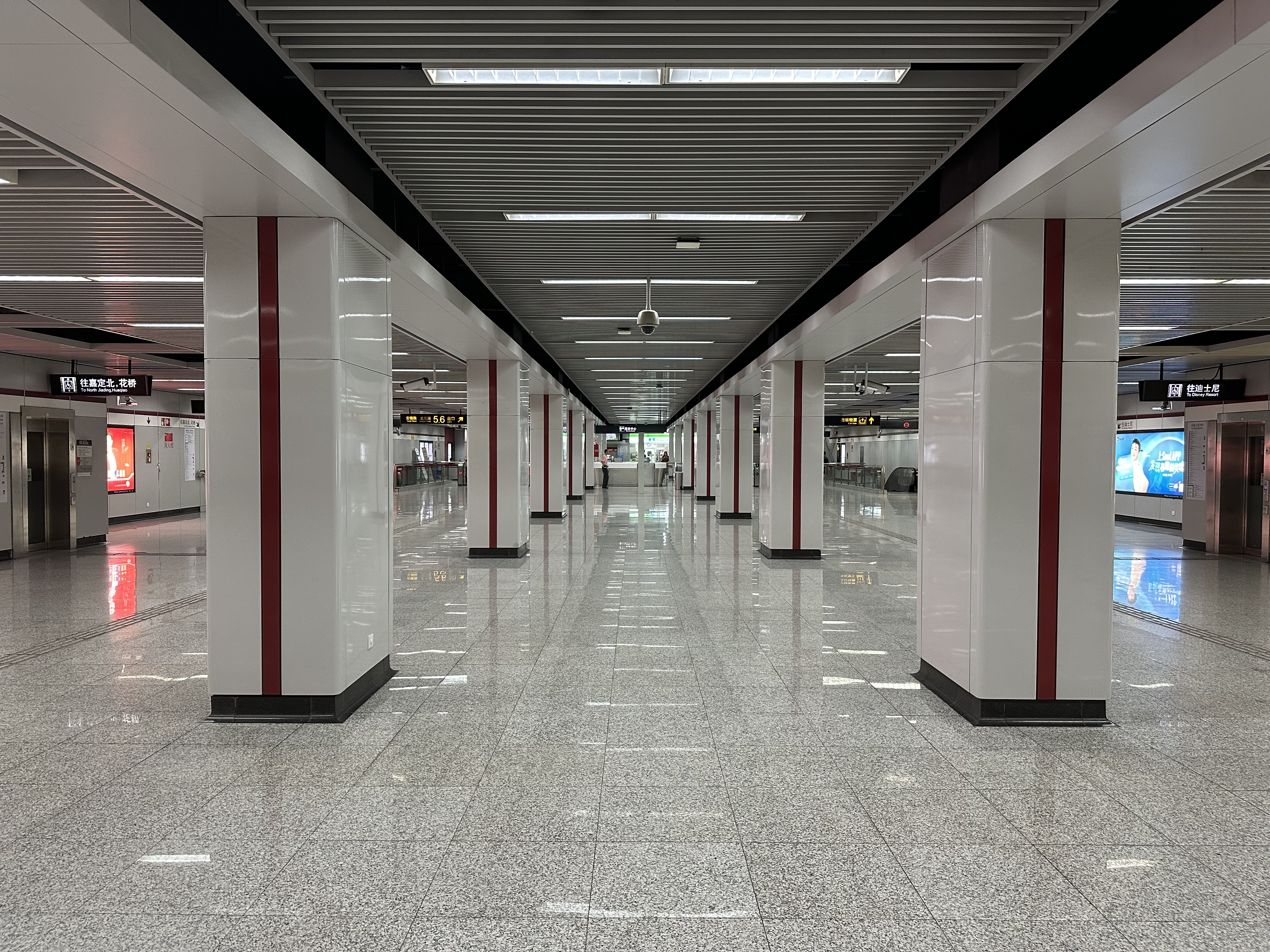
Concourse

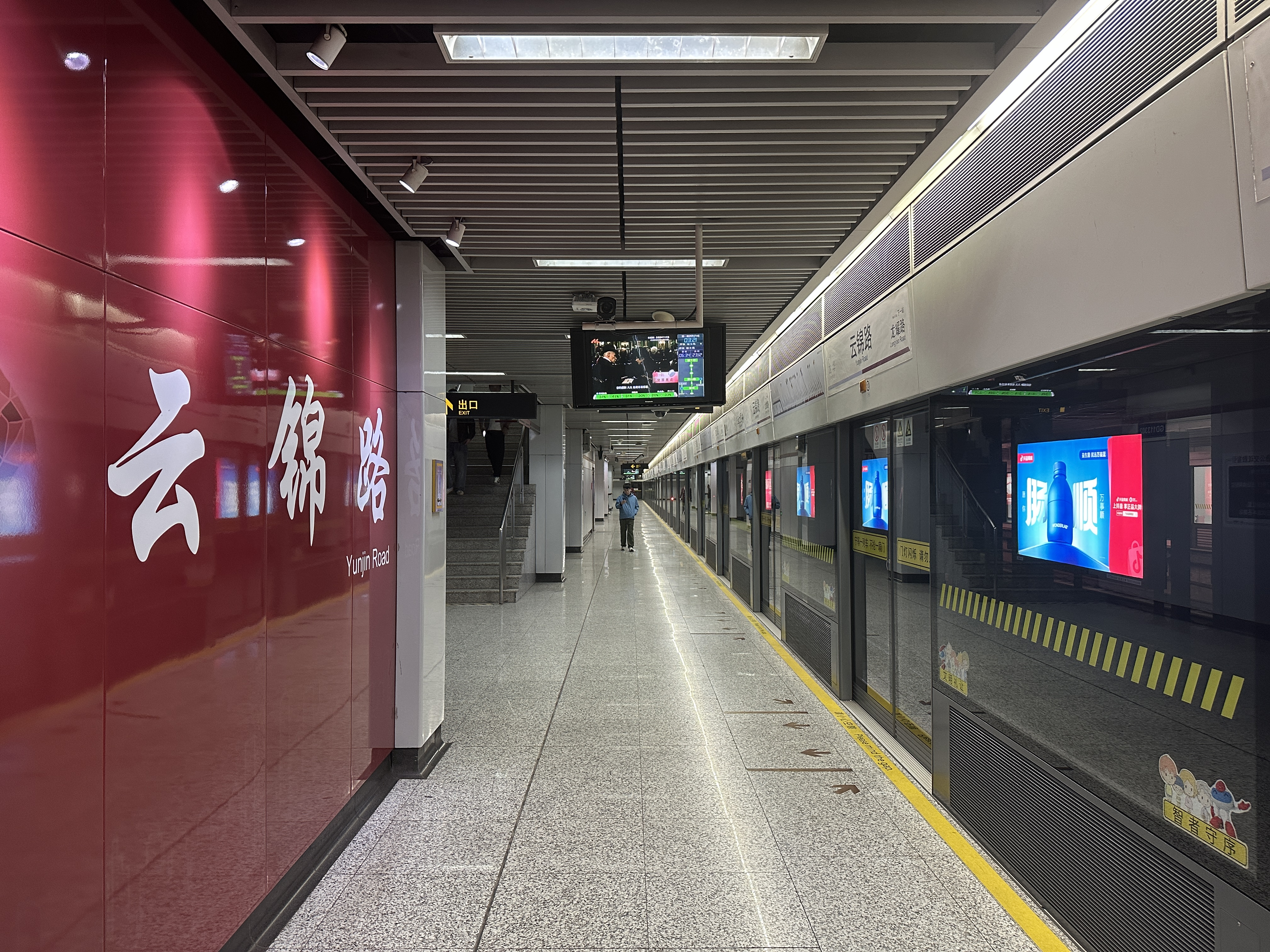
Platform towards Disney Resort

== Exits ==
- Gate 1: Yunjin Road
- Gate 2: Yunjin Road, Longlan Road
- Gate 3: Yunjin Road, Longlan Road
- Gate 4: Yunjin Road, Longqi Road
- Gate 5: Yunjin Road, Longlan Road
- Gate 6: Yunjin Road, Longlan Road
- Gate 7: Yunjin Road
- Passage C: Origin Plaza
- Passage D: MU Plaza
