= Changshu Road station =

Shanghai Metro interchange station

Changshu Road 常熟路
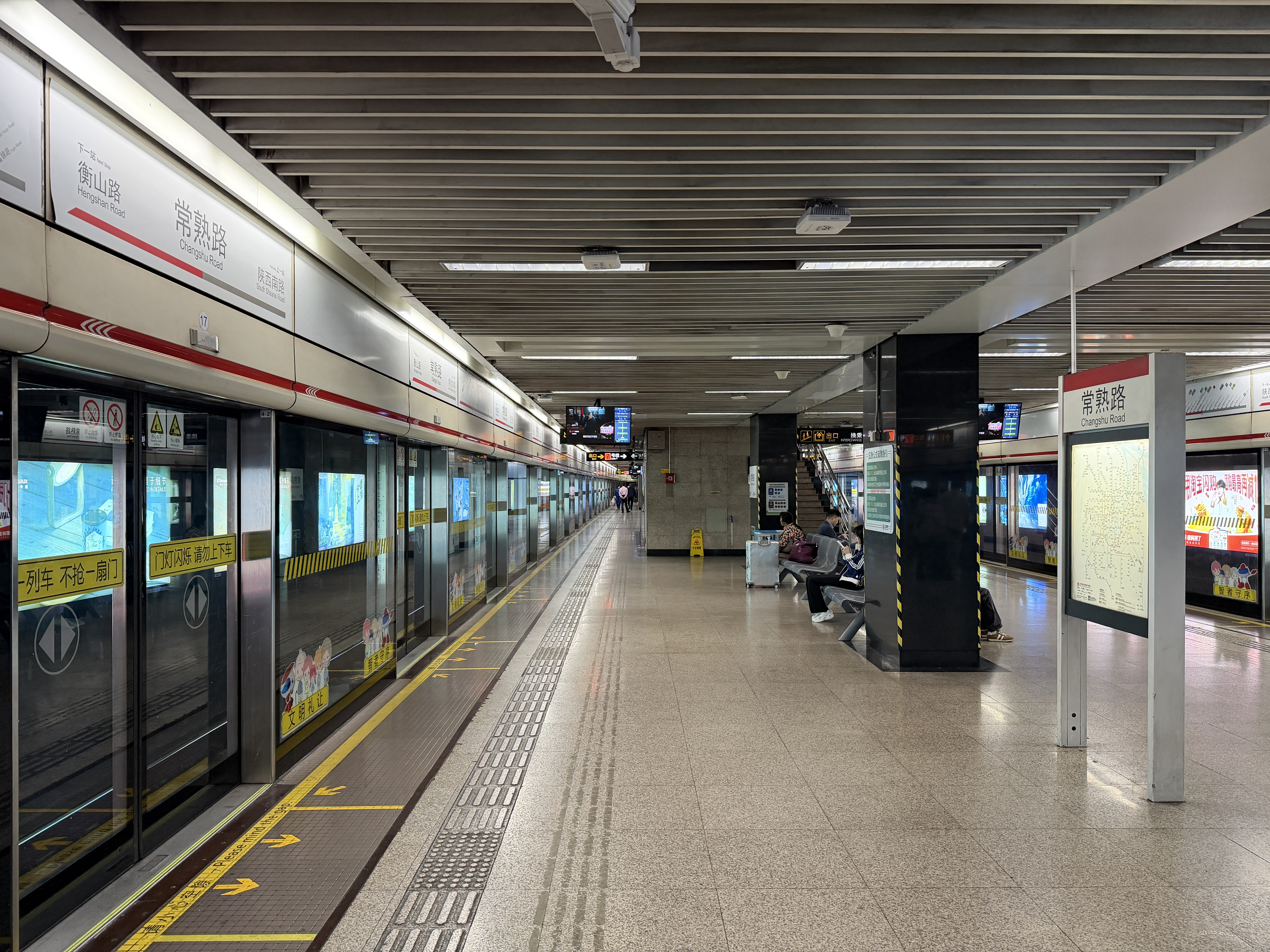
- Line 1 platforms

General information
- Location: Middle Huaihai Road and Changshu Road; Xuhui District, Shanghai; China
- Coordinates: 31°12′49″N 121°26′57″E
- Operator: Shanghai No. 1 Metro Operation Co., Ltd. (Line 1); Shanghai No. 3 Metro Operation Co., Ltd. (Line 7)
- Lines: Line 1; Line 7
- Platforms: 4 (2 island platforms)
- Tracks: 4

Construction
- Structure type: Underground
- Accessible: Yes

Other information
- Station code: L01/10

History
- Opened: 10 April 1995 (Line 1); 5 December 2009 (Line 7)

Services
| Preceding station | Shanghai Metro | Following station |
|---|---|---|
| South Shaanxi Road towards Fujin Road | Line 1 | Hengshan Road towards Xinzhuang |
| Jing'an Temple towards Meilan Lake | Line 7 | Zhaojiabang Road towards Huamu Road |
Location
- Location within Shanghai

Changshu Road (Chinese: 常熟路; pinyin: Chángshú Lù) is an interchange station between lines 1 and 7 of the Shanghai Metro. It is situated in Shanghai's Xuhui District, within the inner ring-road. Furthermore, it provides access to the shopping street Huaihai Road, Shanghai Conservatory of Music as well as the former colonial neighborhood previously called The French Concession.

This station opened on 10 April 1995 as part of the section between Jinjiang Park and Shanghai Railway Station; the interchange with Line 7 opened on 5 December 2009, as part of the latter line's initial section between Shanghai University and Huamu Road. Line 10 passes close by, but does not stop here due to construction difficulties.

== Station Layout ==
| G | Entrances and Exits | Exits 1-8 |
| B1 | Line 1 Concourse | Faregates, Station Agent |
| B2 | Line 7 Concourse | Faregates, Station Agent |
| B2 | Northbound | ← Line 1 towards Fujin Road (South Shaanxi Road) |
| B2 | Island platform, doors open on the left |
| B2 | Southbound | Line 1 towards Xinzhuang (Hengshan Road) → |
| B3 | Northbound | ← Line 7 towards Meilan Lake (Jing'an Temple) |
| B3 | Island platform, doors open on the left |
| B3 | Southbound | Line 7 towards Huamu Road (Zhaojiabang Road) → |

== Places nearby ==
- Huaihai Road, shopping street
- Shanghai Conservatory of Music
