= Shilong Road station =

Shanghai Metro station

Shilong Road 石龙路
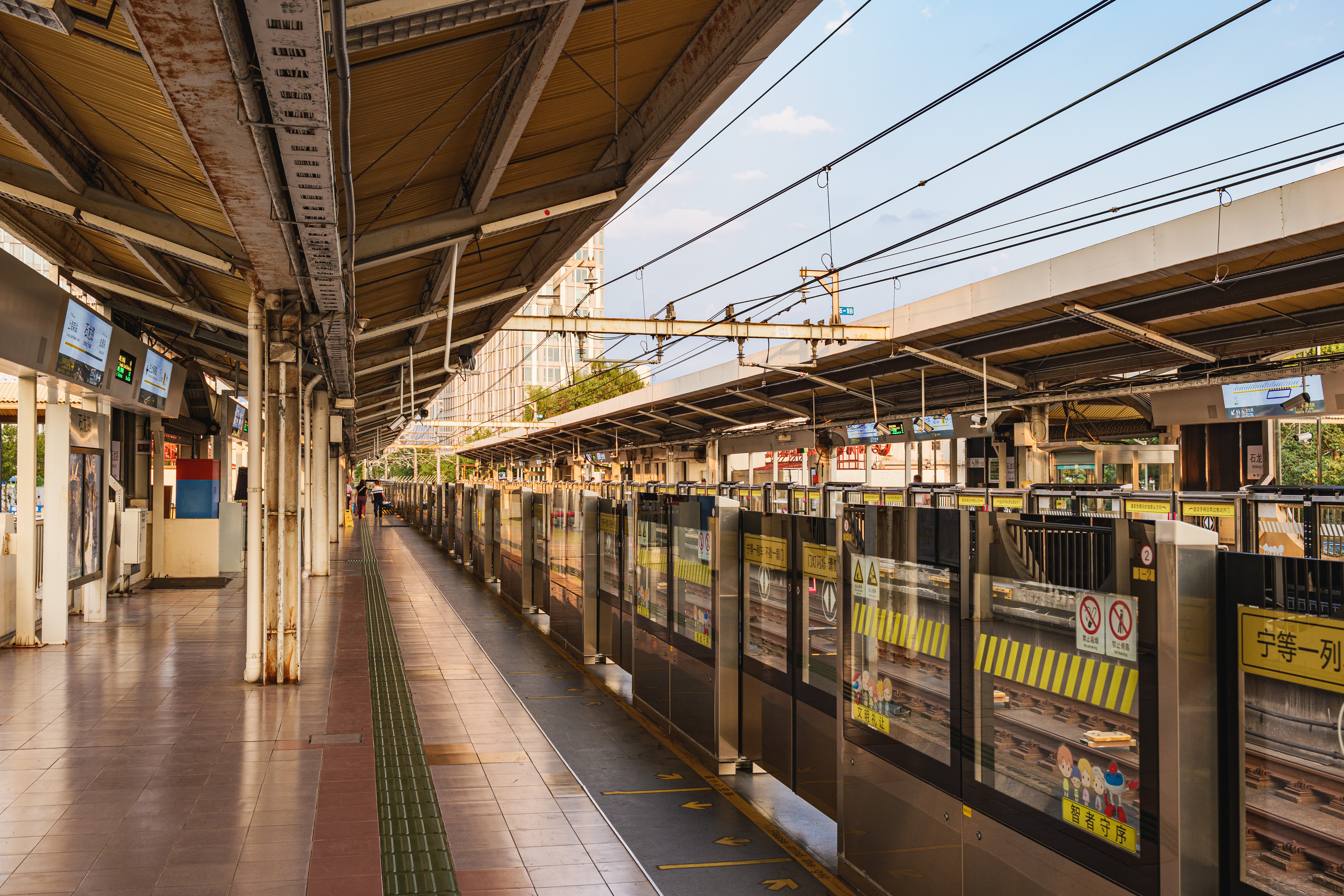
- Line 3 platforms

General information
- Location: Shilong Road; Xuhui District, Shanghai; China
- Coordinates: 31°09′29″N 121°26′36″E
- Operator: Shanghai No. 3 Metro Operation Co. Ltd.
- Line: Line 3
- Platforms: 2 (2 side platforms)
- Tracks: 2

Construction
- Structure type: At-grade
- Accessible: Yes

History
- Opened: 26 December 2000

Services
Preceding station	Shanghai Metro	Following station
Longcao Road towards North Jiangyang Road	Line 3	Shanghai South Railway Station Terminus
Location
- Location within Shanghai

Shilong Road (simplified Chinese: 石龙路; traditional Chinese: 石龍路; pinyin: Shílóng Lù) is a station on Shanghai Metro Line 3. The station opened on 26 December 2000 as part of the initial section of Line 3 from Shanghai South Railway Station to Jiangwan Town.

== Gallery ==
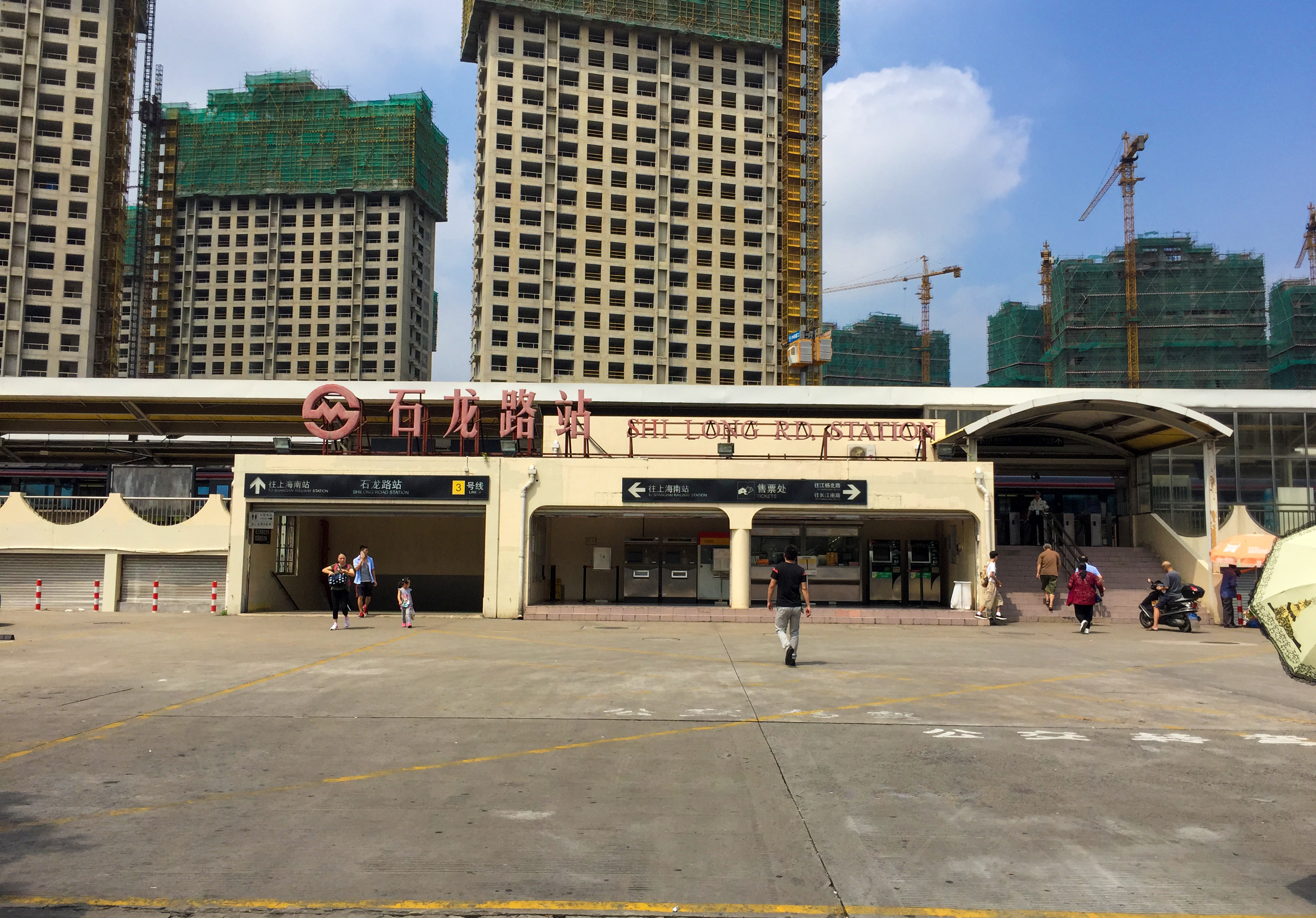
Station exterior

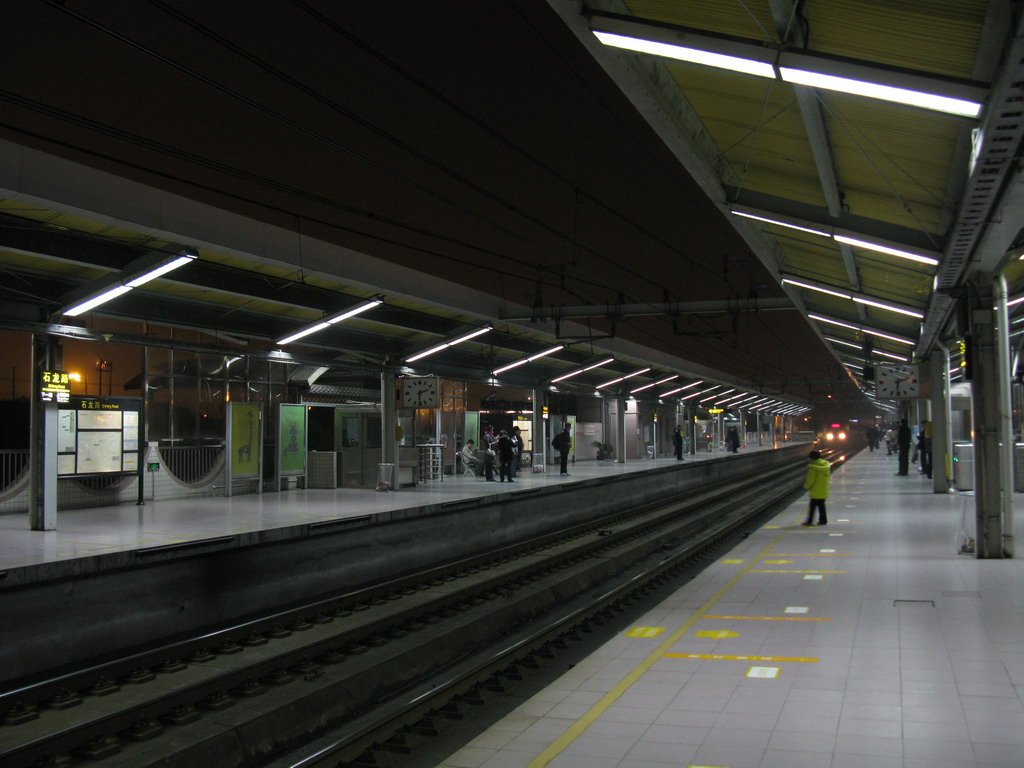
Line 3 platform in 2009
