= Xuhui, Shanghai =

Coordinates: 31°11′N 121°26′E

Xuhui 徐汇区; 徐匯區 Siccawei, Zikawei
- District
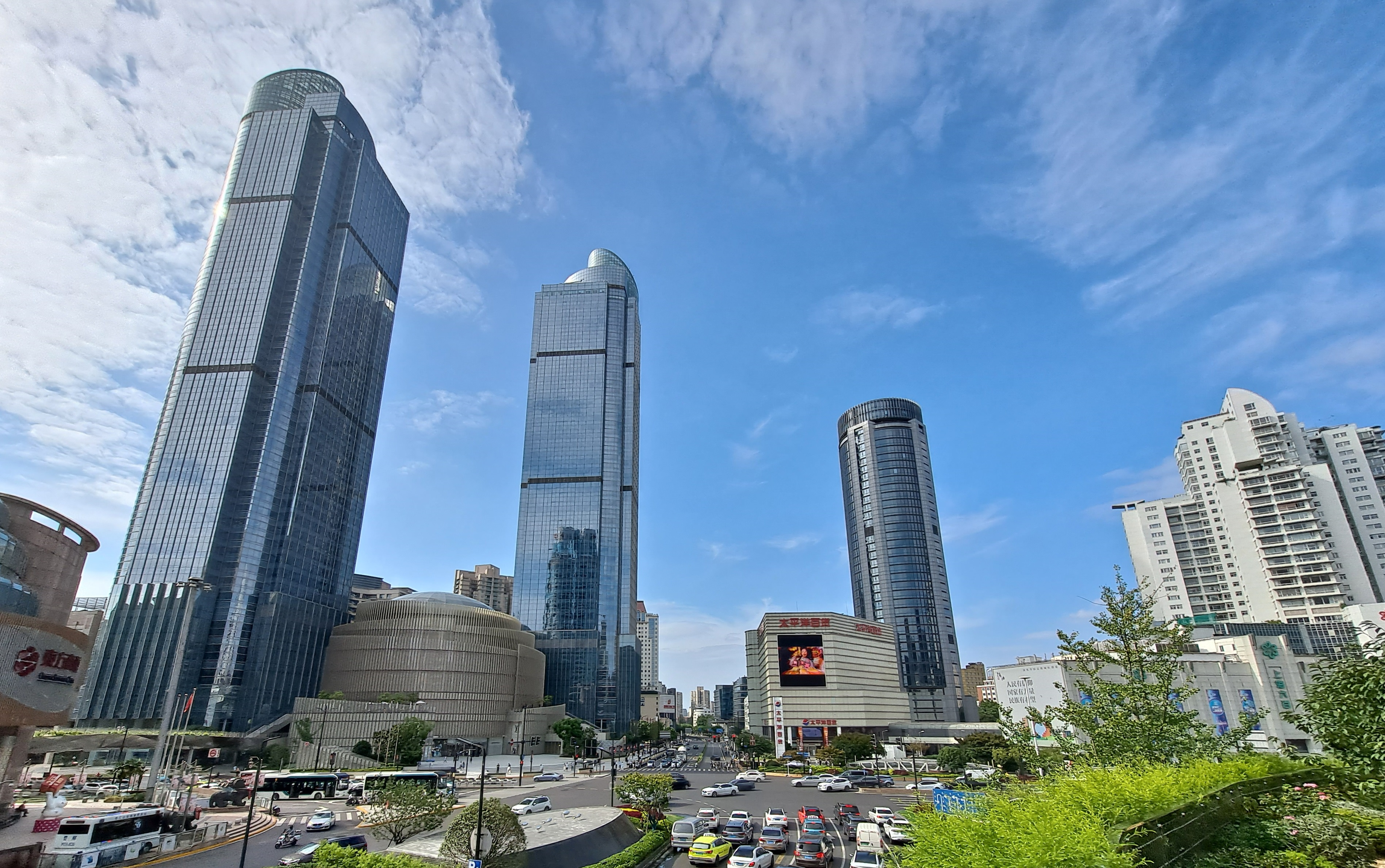
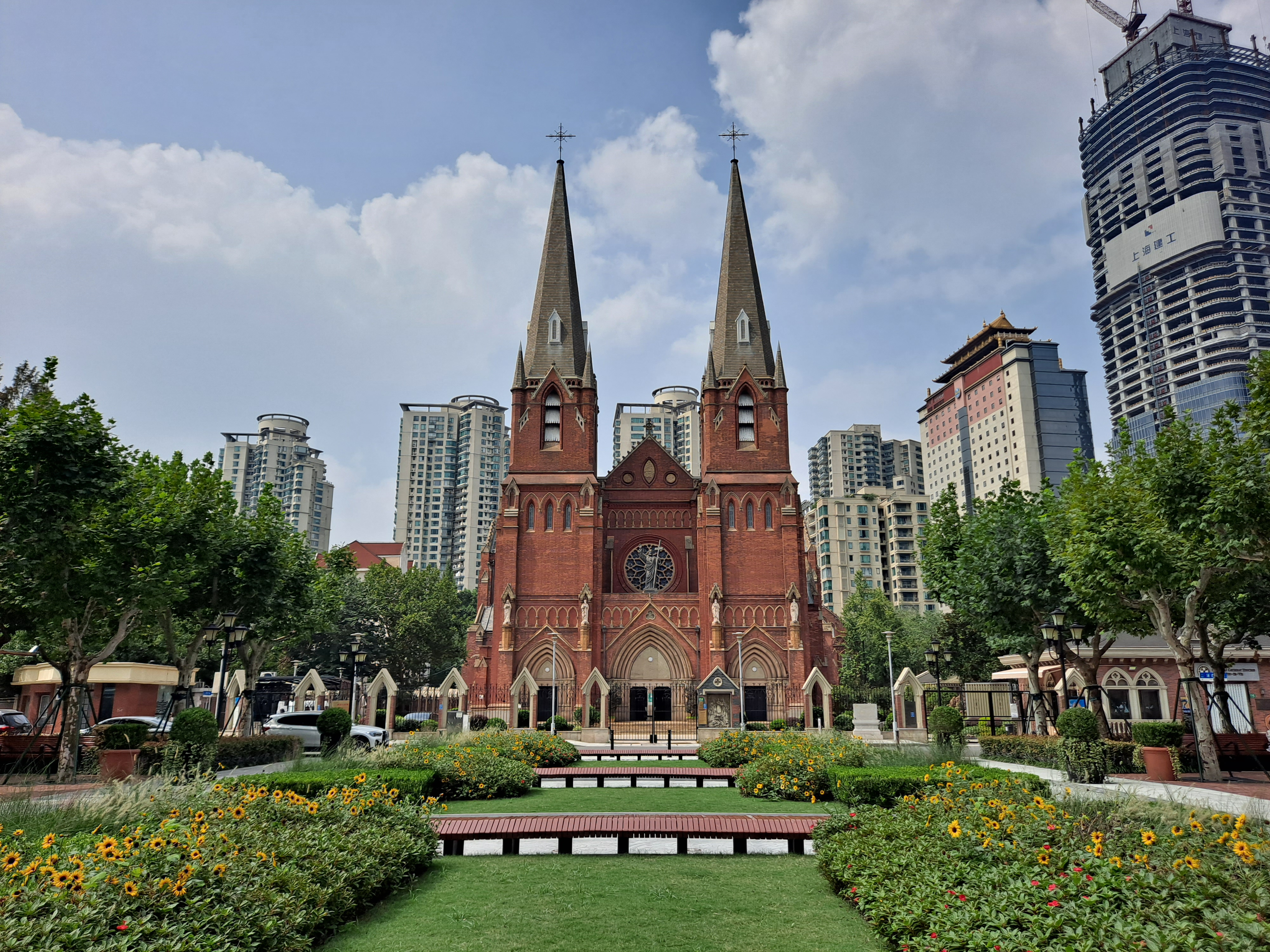
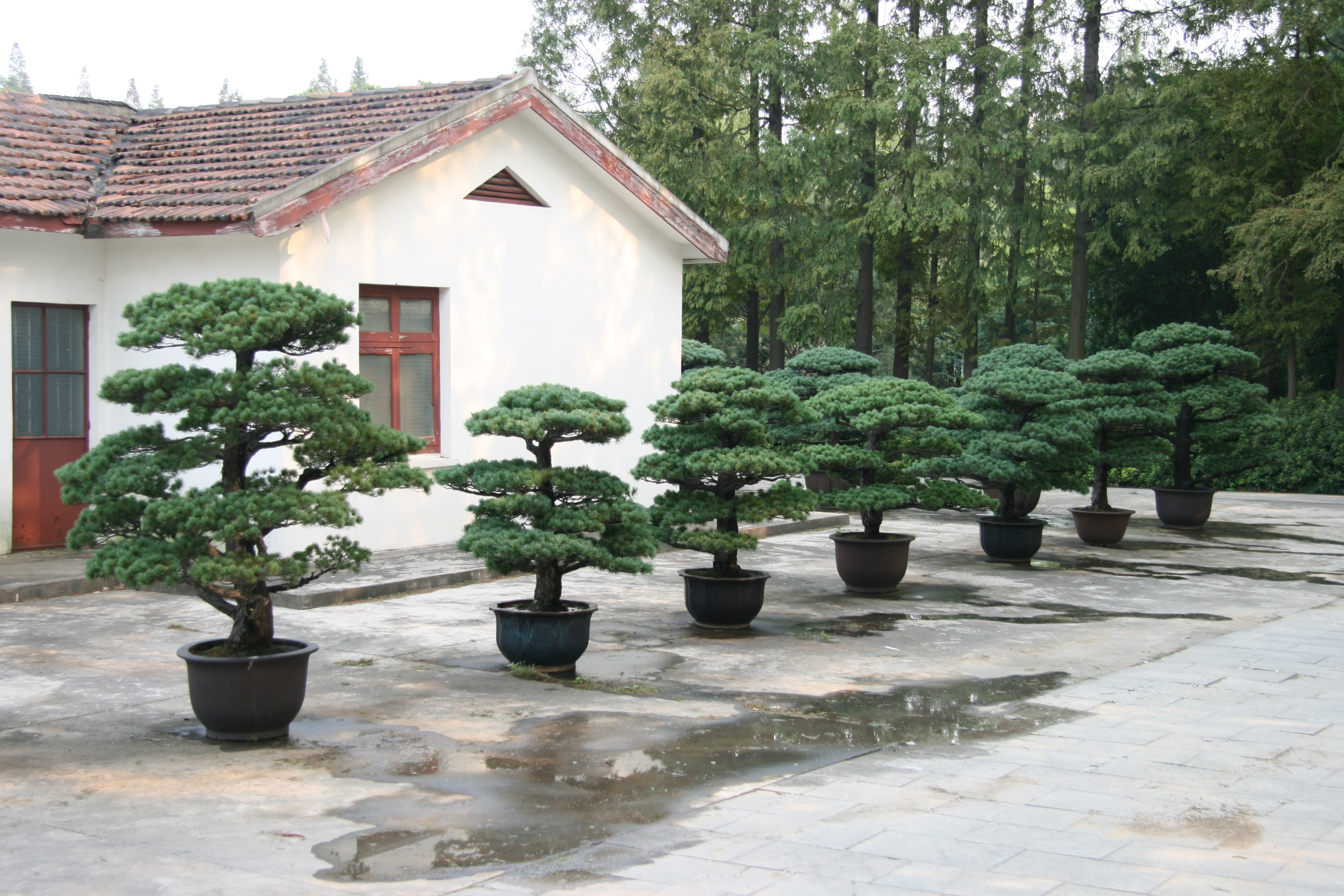
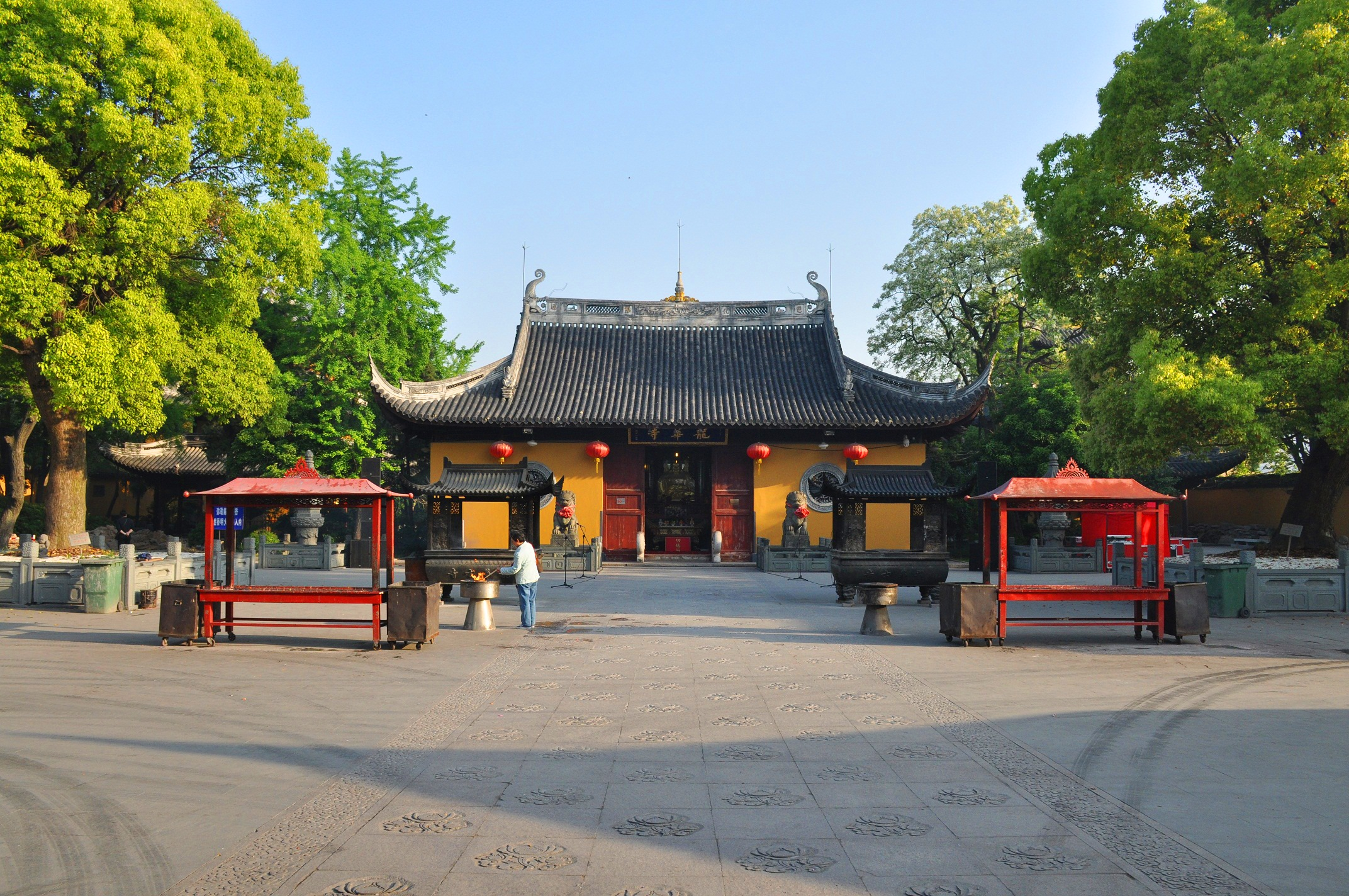
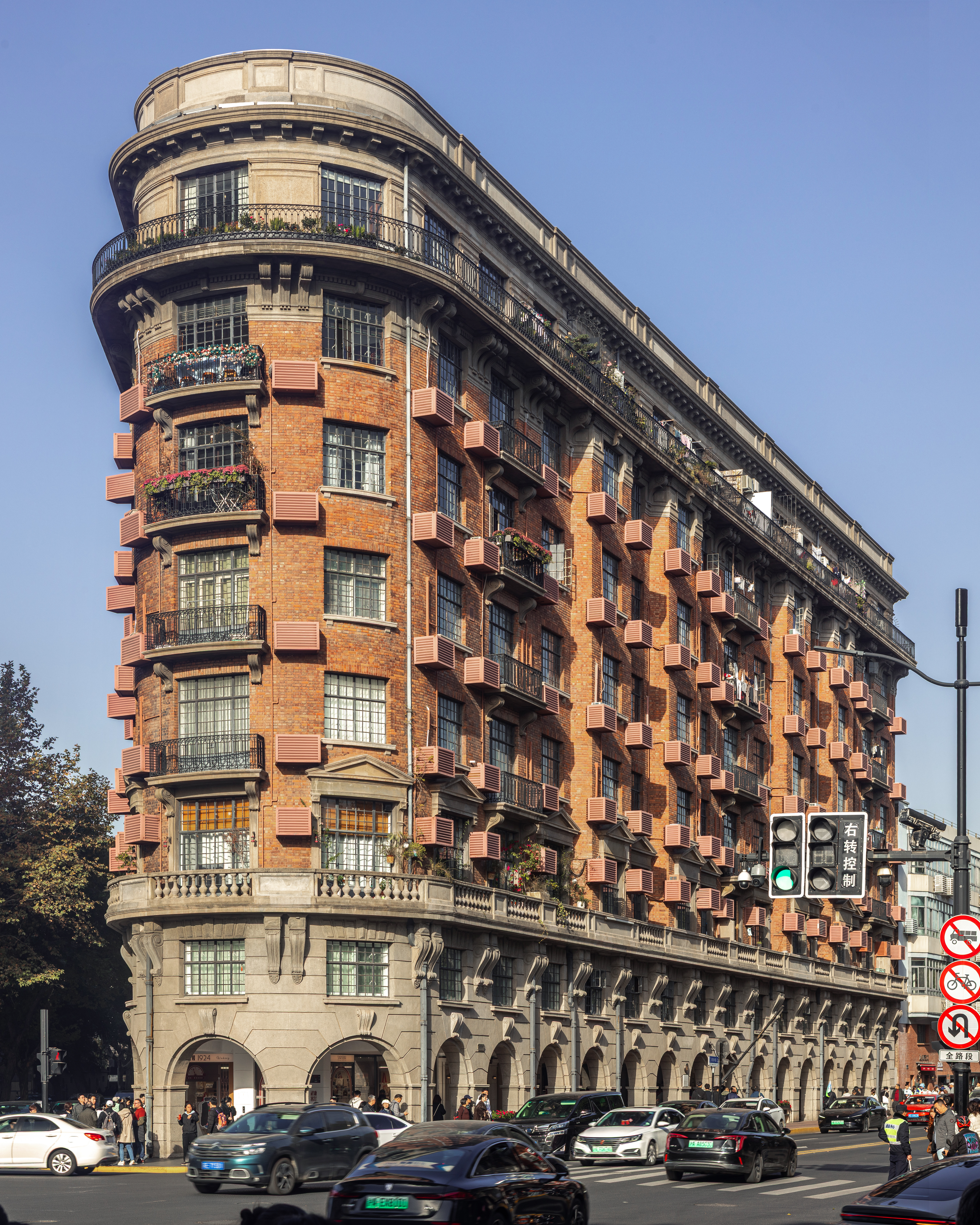
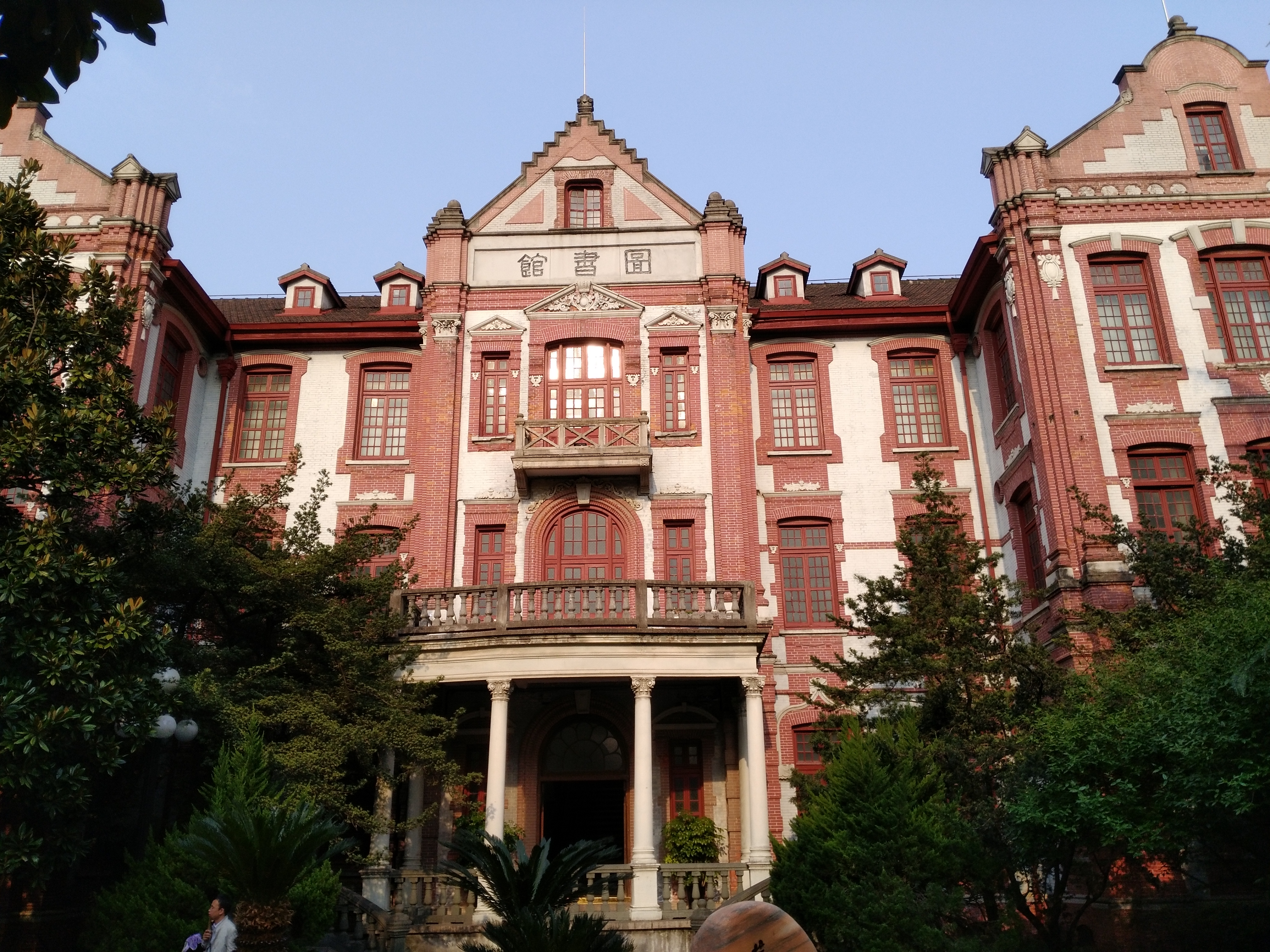
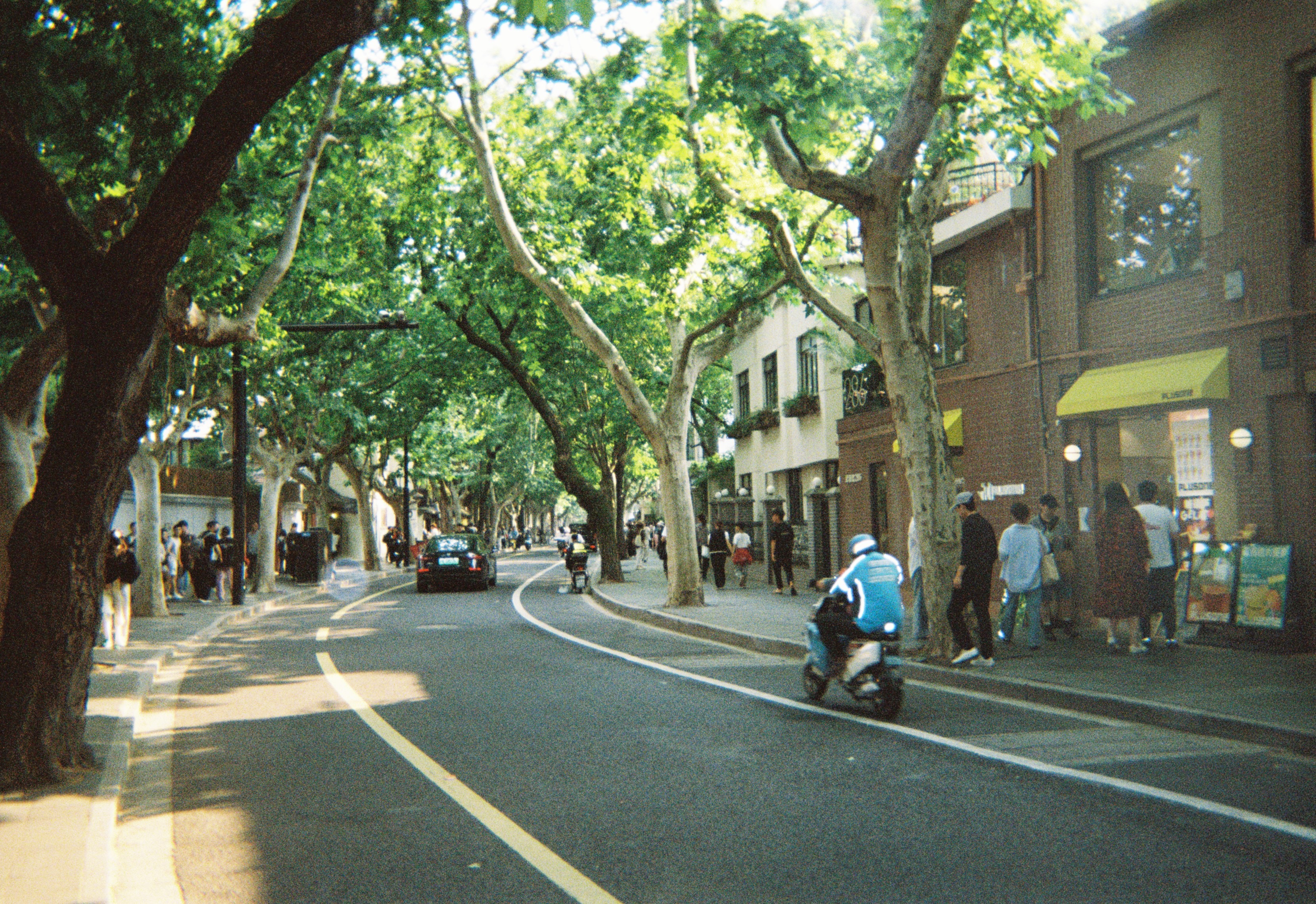
- Xujiahui St. Ignatius Cathedral Shanghai Botanical Garden Longhua Temple Wukang Mansion on Wukang Road Shanghai Jiao Tong University Wukang Road of the Former French Concession

- Xuhui in Shanghai
- Country: People's Republic of China
- Municipality: Shanghai

Government
  - Body: Xihui District People's Congress

Area
  - Total: 54.76 km^{2} (21.14 sq mi)

Population (2020)
  - Total: 1,113,078
  - Density: 20,330/km^{2} (52,650/sq mi)
- Time zone: UTC+8 (China Standard)

Xuhui, Shanghai
- Simplified Chinese: 徐汇区
- Traditional Chinese: 徐匯區
- Wugniu: zi^{2} we^{6} chiu^{1}
- Postal: Siccawei
Transcriptions
Standard Mandarin
- Hanyu Pinyin: Xúhuì Qū
Wu
- Wugniu: zi^{2} we^{6} chiu^{1}
- IPA: Shanghainese: [ʑi˩ ɦue˦ tɕʰy˩]
Yue: Cantonese
- Jyutping: ceoi^{4} wui^{6} keoi^{1}

Xuhui District is a core urban district of Shanghai. It has a land area of 54.76 km^{2} (21.14 sq mi) and a population of 1,113,078 as of 2020. Xuhui District has 12 subdistricts and two townships.

The Xuhui District is named after its namesake, the historic area of Xujiahui. Xujiahui was historically land owned by Ming dynasty bureaucrat and scientist Xu Guangqi, and later donated to the Roman Catholic Church. It and Luwan District jointly formed the core of Catholic Shanghai, centered in the former French Concession of Shanghai. Vestiges of the French influence can still be seen in the St. Ignatius Cathedral of Shanghai, Xuhui College, the Xujiahui Observatory, and some remaining boulevards and French-style districts.

Xujiahui itself has been redeveloped as a financial center, with a proliferation of large-scale shopping centers and department stores, and is now a major shopping destination in the city with shopping malls such as Grand Gateway Shanghai and Pacific Sogo.

== History ==
Parts of today's Xuhui District were once the premier residential districts of Shanghai. The former French neighborhoods in parts of Xuhui today constitute some of the city's most popular café areas, including places such as pedestrian Tianzifang. After the revolution, however, the large estates near Xujiahui were turned into factories. In the 1990s, the Shanghai municipal government developed the district as a commercial zone. A once-prominent commercial area in the district was the Xiangyang Crafts and Gifts Market, a haven for souvenirs and intellectual property-infringing products; it was closed on June 30, 2006, by municipal authorities.

== Economy ==
Xujiahui itself has been redeveloped as a financial center, with a proliferation of large-scale shopping centers and department stores, and is now a major shopping destination in the city with shopping malls such as Grand Gateway Shanghai and Pacific Sogo.

Home Inn has its headquarters in Xuhui. Yum China has its headquarters in the Yum China Building (Chinese: 百胜中国大厦; pinyin: Bǎishèng Zhōngguó Dàshà) in Xuhui District. Toei Animation Shanghai has its head office in Unit 807 of Feidiao International Plaza in the district. miHoYo has its headquarters in Xuhui. Yoozoo Games is headquartered in Xuhui. Previously Web International English had its headquarters in Xuhui.

== Township-level subdivisions ==
Xuhui District has twelve subdistricts, one town and one special township-level division.

Name	Chinese (S)	Hanyu Pinyin	Shanghainese Romanization	Population (2010)	Area (km^{2})
Caohejing Subdistrict	漕河泾街道	Cáohéjīng Jiēdào	dzo wu cin ga do	97,917	5.26
Changqiao Subdistrict	长桥街道	Chángqiáo Jiēdào	tzan djio ga do	118,872	15.3
Fenglin Road Subdistrict	枫林路街道	Fēnglínlù Jiēdào	fon lin lu ga do	112,400	2.69
Hongmei Road Subdistrict	虹梅路街道	Hóngméilù Jiēdào	ron me lu ga do	34,877	5.98
Hunan Road Subdistrict	湖南路街道	Húnánlù Jiēdào	wu neu lu ga do	36,281	1.72
Kangjian Xincun Subdistrict	康健新村街道	Kāngjiàn Xīncūn Jiēdào	khaon dji sin tsen ga do	100,444	4.07
Lingyun Road Subdistrict	凌云路街道	Língyún lù Jiēdào	lin yun lu ga do	108,582	3.58
Longhua Subdistrict	龙华街道	Lónghuá Jiēdào	lon rau ga do	85,769	6.53
Tianlin Subdistrict	田林街道	Tiánlín Jiēdào	di lin ga do	97,171	4.19
Tianping Road Subdistrict	天平路街道	Tiānpínglù Jiēdào	thi bin lu ga do	60,533	2.69
Xietu Road Subdistrict	斜土路街道	Xiétǔlù Jiēdào	zia thu lu ga do	69,710	2.67
Xujiahui Subdistrict	徐家汇街道	Xújiāhuì Jiēdào	xi ga we ga do	92,915	4.04
Huajing town	华泾镇	Huájīng Zhèn	rau cin tzen	67,415	8.04
Caohejing Hi-tech Park	漕河泾新兴技术开发区	Cáohéjīng Xīnxīng Jìshù Kāifāqū	dzo wu cin sin xin djij dzeq khe faq chiu	2,244	10.70

== Climate ==
Xuhui has a humid subtropical climate (Köppen climate classification Cfa). The average annual temperature in Xuhui is 16.9 °C (62.4 °F). The average annual rainfall is 1,259.3 mm (49.58 in) with July as the wettest month. The temperatures are highest on average in July, at around 28.6 °C (83.5 °F), and lowest in January, at around 4.8 °C (40.6 °F).

Climate data for Shanghai (Xujiahui), elevation 5 m (16 ft), (1991–2020 normals, extremes 1951–present)
Month	Jan	Feb	Mar	Apr	May	Jun	Jul	Aug	Sep	Oct	Nov	Dec	Year
Record high °C (°F)	21.6 (70.9)	27.0 (80.6)	29.5 (85.1)	33.9 (93.0)	36.7 (98.1)	38.4 (101.1)	40.9 (105.6)	40.8 (105.4)	38.2 (100.8)	36.0 (96.8)	28.5 (83.3)	23.4 (74.1)	40.9 (105.6)
Mean daily maximum °C (°F)	8.7 (47.7)	10.7 (51.3)	14.9 (58.8)	20.9 (69.6)	25.8 (78.4)	28.6 (83.5)	33.2 (91.8)	32.6 (90.7)	28.7 (83.7)	23.5 (74.3)	17.8 (64.0)	11.3 (52.3)	21.4 (70.5)
Daily mean °C (°F)	5.4 (41.7)	7.0 (44.6)	10.7 (51.3)	16.1 (61.0)	21.3 (70.3)	24.7 (76.5)	29.1 (84.4)	28.8 (83.8)	25.1 (77.2)	19.9 (67.8)	14.3 (57.7)	7.9 (46.2)	17.5 (63.5)
Mean daily minimum °C (°F)	2.9 (37.2)	4.1 (39.4)	7.6 (45.7)	12.6 (54.7)	17.9 (64.2)	22.0 (71.6)	26.2 (79.2)	26.2 (79.2)	22.5 (72.5)	17.1 (62.8)	11.4 (52.5)	5.3 (41.5)	14.7 (58.4)
Record low °C (°F)	−10.1 (13.8)	−7.9 (17.8)	−5.4 (22.3)	−0.5 (31.1)	6.9 (44.4)	12.3 (54.1)	16.3 (61.3)	18.8 (65.8)	10.8 (51.4)	1.7 (35.1)	−4.2 (24.4)	−8.5 (16.7)	−10.1 (13.8)
Average precipitation mm (inches)	72.2 (2.84)	65.0 (2.56)	97.3 (3.83)	84.2 (3.31)	91.0 (3.58)	224.9 (8.85)	163.2 (6.43)	225.9 (8.89)	131.5 (5.18)	69.6 (2.74)	61.4 (2.42)	50.4 (1.98)	1,336.6 (52.61)
Average precipitation days (≥ 0.1 mm)	10.6	10.4	12.7	11.3	11.2	14.3	12.2	12.7	10.1	7.5	9.2	8.5	130.7
Average snowy days	2.1	1.8	0.5	0.0	0	0	0	0	0	0	0.1	0.9	5.4
Average relative humidity (%)	71	71	70	69	70	79	76	76	74	70	71	69	72
Mean monthly sunshine hours	114.3	119.9	128.5	148.5	169.8	130.9	190.8	185.7	167.5	161.4	131.1	127.4	1,775.8
Source: China Meteorological Administration (sun 1981–2010) all-time extreme temperature

== Education ==
The educational tradition begun by Jesuits in Xuhui continues with Shanghai Jiao Tong University, the premier university in China. The district also has some of the best secondary schools in the municipality, such as South West Weiyu Middle School, Shanghai High School and Nanyang Model High School.

Universities

1. Shanghai Jiao Tong University
2. East China University of Science and Technology
3. Shanghai Normal University
4. Shanghai University of Traditional Chinese Medicine
5. Shanghai Conservatory of Music

High schools

1. Shanghai Nanyang Model High School (上海市南洋模范中学)
2. Shanghai Nanyang High School (上海市南洋中学)
3. Shanghai Xuhui High School (上海市徐匯中學)
4. Shanghai Weiyu High School (上海市位育高级中学)
5. Shanghai Southwest Weiyu Middle School
6. Shanghai High School
7. Shanghai No. 2 High School
8. Shanghai No. 45 High School (上海市第五十四中学)
9. High School Affiliated to Shanghai University (上海师范大学附属中学) original campus

== Transportation ==
=== Metro ===
Xuhui is currently served by seven metro lines operated by Shanghai Metro:

- Line 1 - Jinjiang Park, Shanghai South Railway Station 3 , Caobao Road, Shanghai Indoor Stadium 4 , Xujiahui 9 11 , Hengshan Road, Changshu Road 7
- Line 3 - Shanghai South Railway Station 1 , Shilong Road, Longcao Road, Caoxi Road, Yishan Road 4 9
- Line 4 - Yishan Road 3 9 , Shanghai Stadium
- Line 7 - Changshu Road 1 , Zhaojiabang Road 9 , Dong'an Road 4 , Middle Longhua Road
- Line 9 - Caohejing Hi-Tech Park, Guilin Road, Yishan Road 3 4 , Xujiahui 1 11 , Zhaojiabang Road 7 , Jiashan Road
- Line 10 - Jiaotong University 11 , Shanghai Library
- Line 11 - Longyao Road, Yunjin Road, Longhua, Shanghai Swimming Center, Xujiahui 1 9

=== Suburban Railway ===
Xuhui is currently served by one suburban railway operated by China Railway Shanghai Group.

- Jinshan Railway - Shanghai South railway station

== Notable residents ==
A number of former residences of prominent personalities remain, including Soong Ching-ling and Sun Yat-sen's former residence. Yao Ming of Houston Rockets was a resident of the district. Luo "Ferrari 430" Feichi lives in Xuhui.

== See also ==
- Shanghai Corniche
- Xu Guangqi
- Xujiahui
