= Shanghai Swimming Center station =

Shanghai Metro station

Shanghai Swimming Center 上海游泳馆
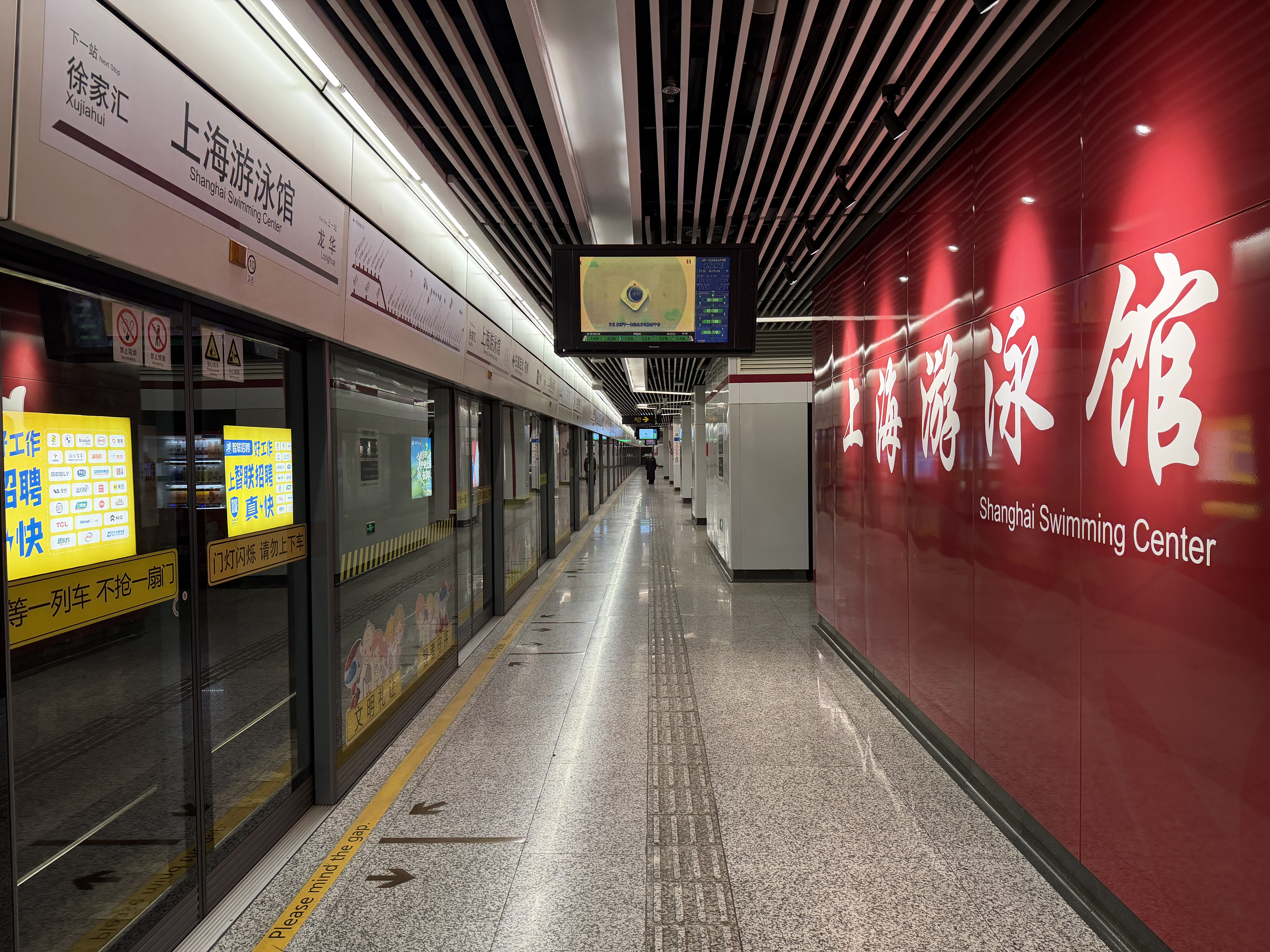
- Station platform

General information
- Location: Xuhui District, Shanghai; China
- Coordinates: 31.179°N 121.441°E
- Operator: Shanghai No. 2 Metro Operation Co. Ltd.
- Line: Line 11
- Platforms: 2 (1 island platform)
- Tracks: 2

Construction
- Structure type: Underground
- Accessible: Yes

History
- Opened: 31 August 2013; 12 years ago

Services
Preceding station	Shanghai Metro	Following station
Xujiahui towards North Jiading or Huaqiao	Line 11	Longhua towards Disney Resort
Location
- Location within Shanghai

Shanghai Swimming Center (simplified Chinese: 上海游泳馆; traditional Chinese: 上海游泳館; pinyin: Shànghǎi Yóuyǒngguǎn) is a station on Line 11 of the Shanghai Metro, which opened on 31 August 2013.

This station is located underground near Shanghai Indoor Stadium station and Shanghai Stadium station.
