= Xujiahui station =

Shanghai Metro interchange station

Xujiahui 徐家汇
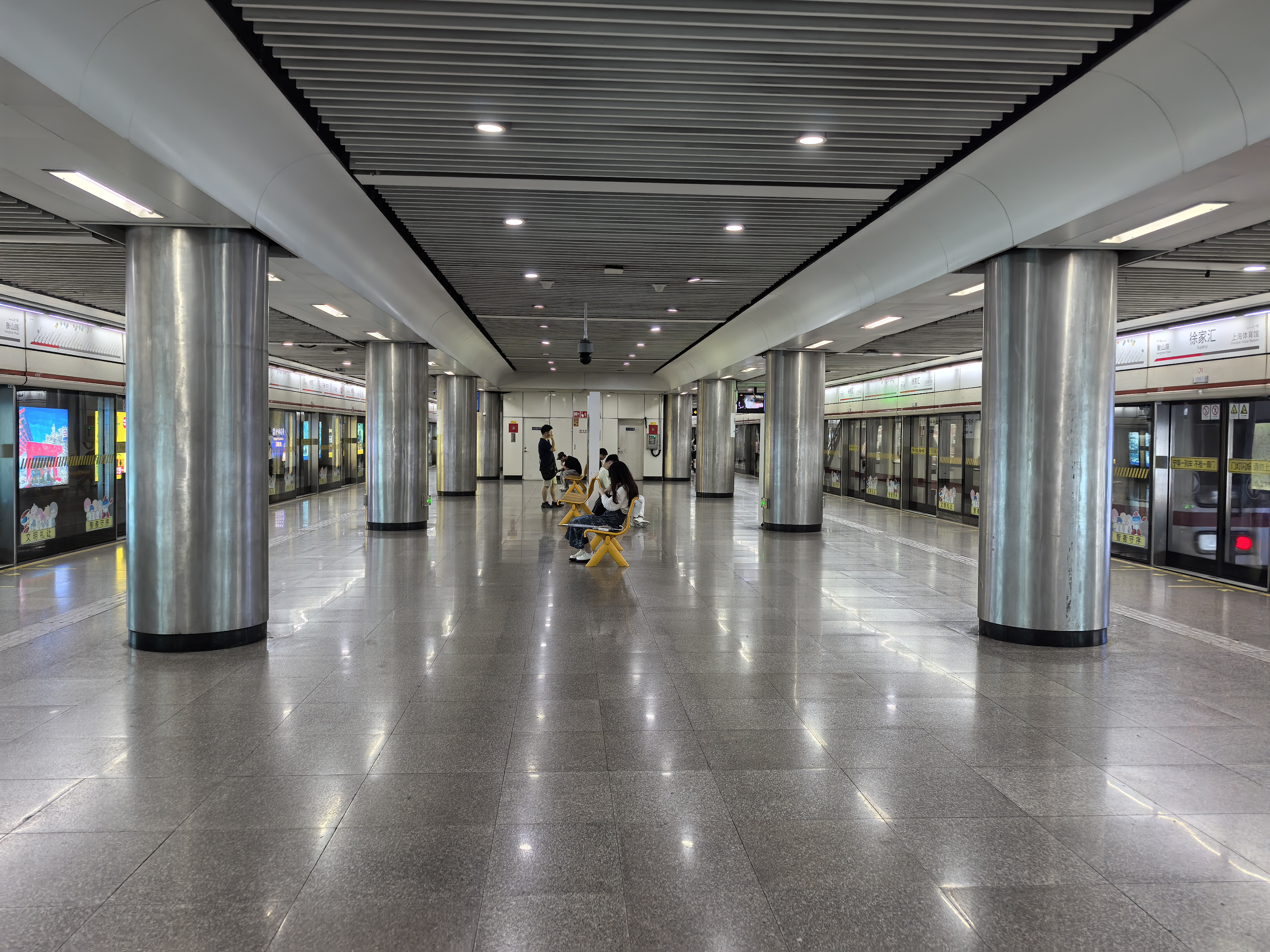
- Line 1 platforms

General information
- Location: North Caoxi Road, Xujiahui; Xuhui District, Shanghai; China
- Coordinates: 31°11′40″N 121°26′16″E
- Operator: Shanghai No. 1/2 Metro Operation Co. Ltd.
- Lines: Line 1; Line 9; Line 11
- Platforms: 6 (3 island platforms)
- Tracks: 6

Construction
- Structure type: Underground
- Accessible: Yes

History
- Opened: 28 May 1993 (Line 1); 31 December 2009 (Line 9); 31 August 2013 (Line 11)

Services
Preceding station	Shanghai Metro	Following station
Hengshan Road towards Fujin Road	Line 1	Shanghai Indoor Stadium towards Xinzhuang
Yishan Road towards Shanghai Songjiang Railway Station	Line 9	Zhaojiabang Road towards Caolu
Jiao Tong University towards North Jiading or Huaqiao	Line 11	Shanghai Swimming Center towards Disney Resort
Location
- Location within Shanghai

Xujiahui (Chinese: 徐家汇; pinyin: Xújiāhuì) is an interchange station between lines 1, 9 and 11 of the Shanghai Metro. It is located in the Xujiahui area of Xuhui District, Shanghai. The station is one of the busiest in the metro system, and is extremely crowded during peak hours. Six large shopping malls and eight large office towers are each within no more than a three-minute walk of one of the station's exits. The station has a total of 20 exits, more than any other subway station in Shanghai.

This station is part of the initial southern section of the line that opened on 28 May 1993; the interchanges with Line 9 and Line 11 opened respectively on 31 December 2009 and 31 August 2013.

== Station layout ==
1F	Ground level	Exits
B1	Lines 9 & 11 concourse	Tickets, Service Center
B2	Platform 3	← Line 9 towards Shanghai Songjiang Railway Station (Yishan Road)
B2	Island platform, doors open on the left
B2	Platform 4	Line 9 towards Caolu (Zhaojiabang Road) →
B2	Lines 1 concourse	Tickets, Service Center
B3	Platform 2	← Line 1 towards Fujin Road (Hengshan Road)
B3	Island platform, doors open on the left
B3	Platform 1	Line 1 towards Xinzhuang (Shanghai Indoor Stadium) →
B4	Platform 5	← Line 11 towards North Jiading or Huaqiao (Jiao Tong University)
B4	Island platform, doors open on the left
B4	Platform 6	Line 11 towards Disney Resort (Shanghai Swimming Center) →

=== Entrances/exits ===
- 1: North Caoxi Road, Nandan Road,Shanghai Meteorological Bureau
- 2: North Caoxi Road, East Nandan Road
- 3: North Caoxi Road, Puxi Road, Zikawei Library
- 4: North Caoxi Road, Buynow
- 5: North Caoxi Road, Buynow
- 7: North Caoxi Road
- 8: North Caoxi Road, Shangshi Mansion
- 9: North Caoxi Road, Pacific Digital Plaza 1, Metro City
- 10: North Caoxi Road, Zhaojiabang Road, Tianyaoqiao Road, Metro City, TPY Center
- 11: North Caoxi Road, Hongqiao Road, Oriental Shopping Center
- 12A & 12B: Hongqiao Road, Gongcheng Road, Huashan Road, Grand Gateway Plaza
- 13: Huashan Road, Hengshan Road
- 14: Tianping Road, Zhaojiabang Road, Huijin Department Store, Xujiahui Park
- 15: Huashan Road, International Peace Maternity & Child Health Hospital of China Welfare Institute
- 16: Huashan Road, Grand Gateway Plaza
- 17: Grand Gateway Plaza
- 18: Gongcheng Road
- 19: (temporary closed)
- 20: Hongqiao Road

(References:)

== Places nearby ==
- Xujiahui shopping district
- St. Ignatius Cathedral (Exit 3)
- Fudan University, Fenlin Road Campus
- Shanghai Jiao Tong University, Xuhui Campus
- Bibliotheca Zi-Ka-Wei
- Shanghai Astronomical Observatory Xujiahui; Shanghai Meteorological Bureau

== Gallery ==
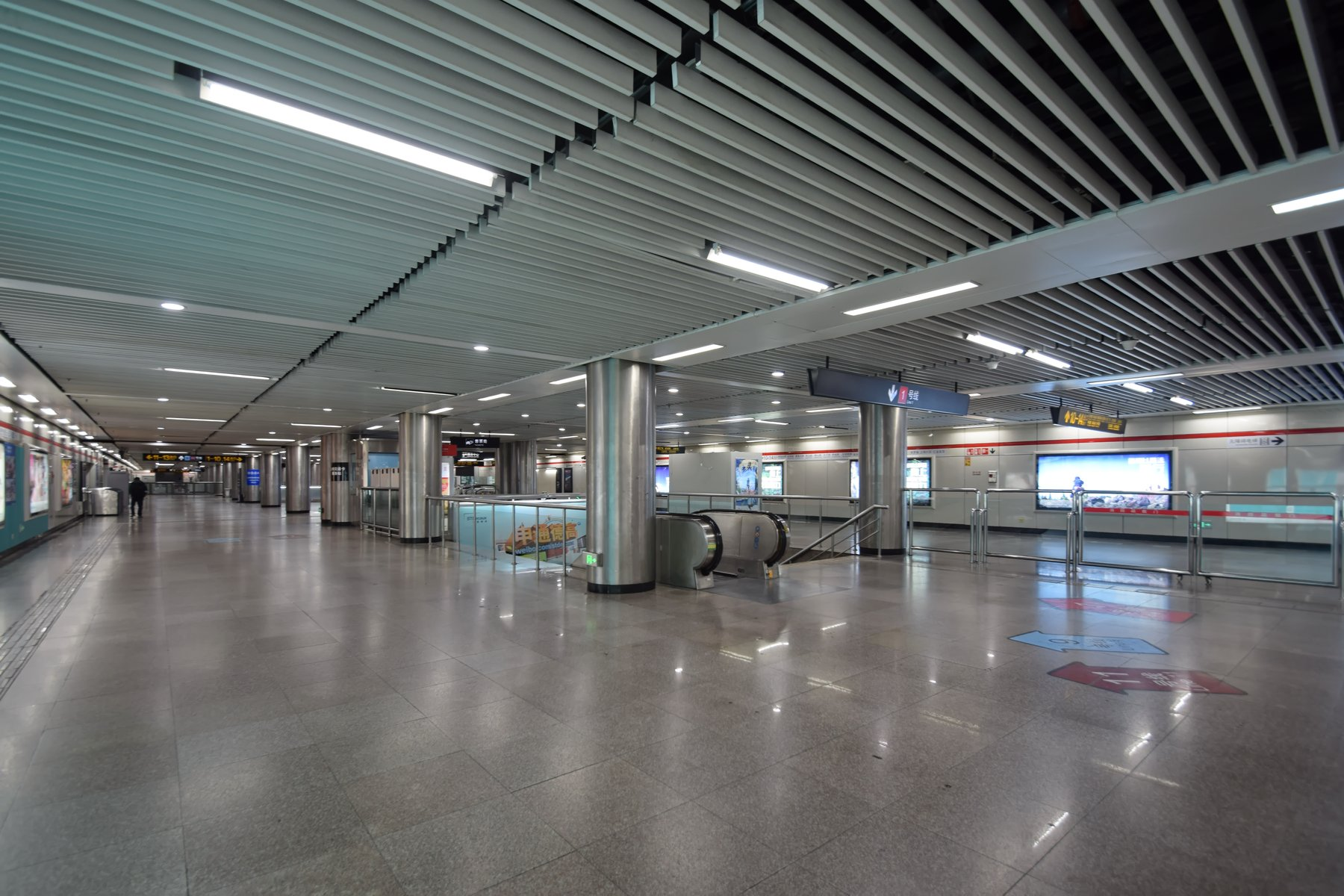
Concourse of Line 1

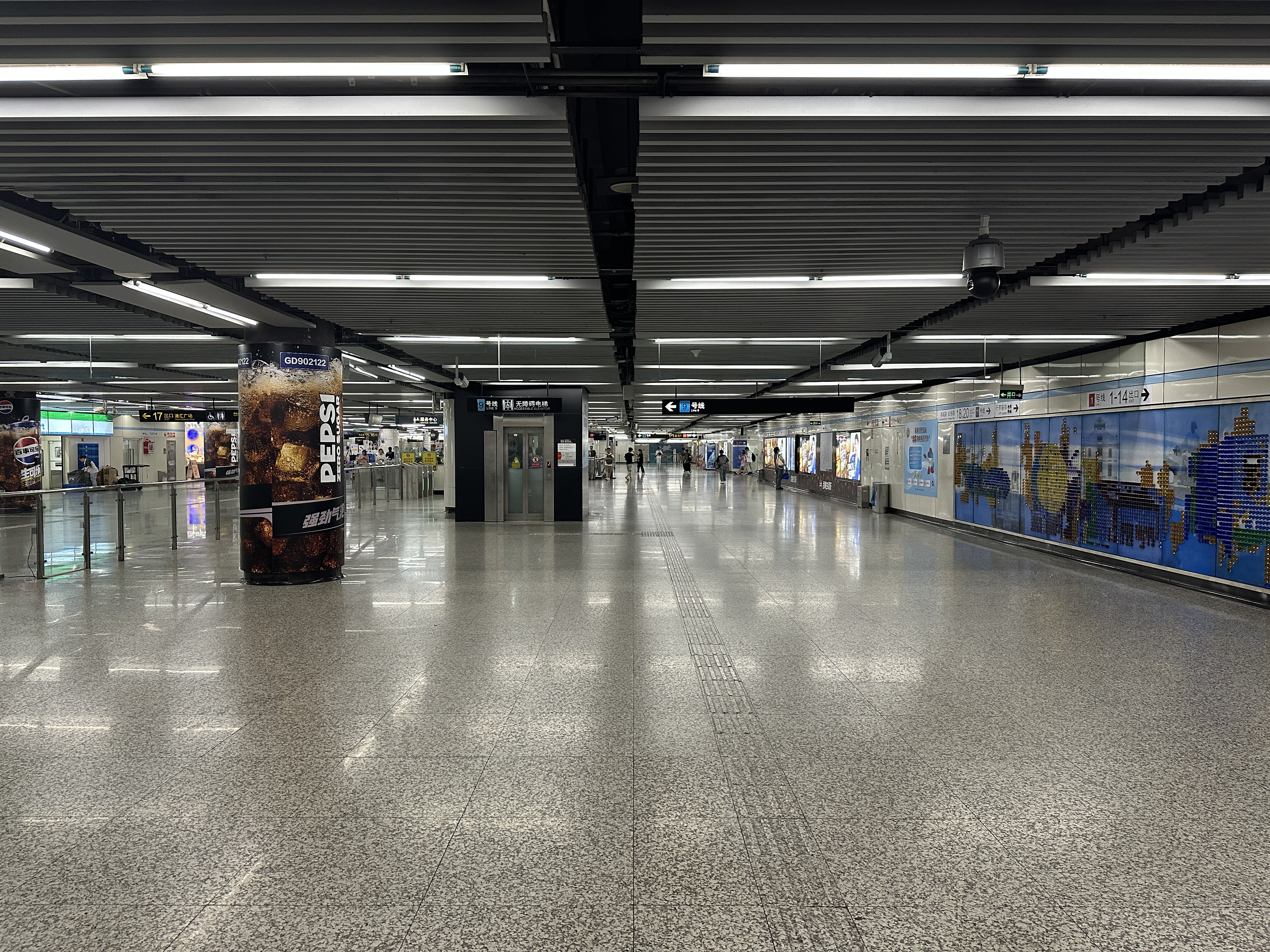
Concourse of Line 9

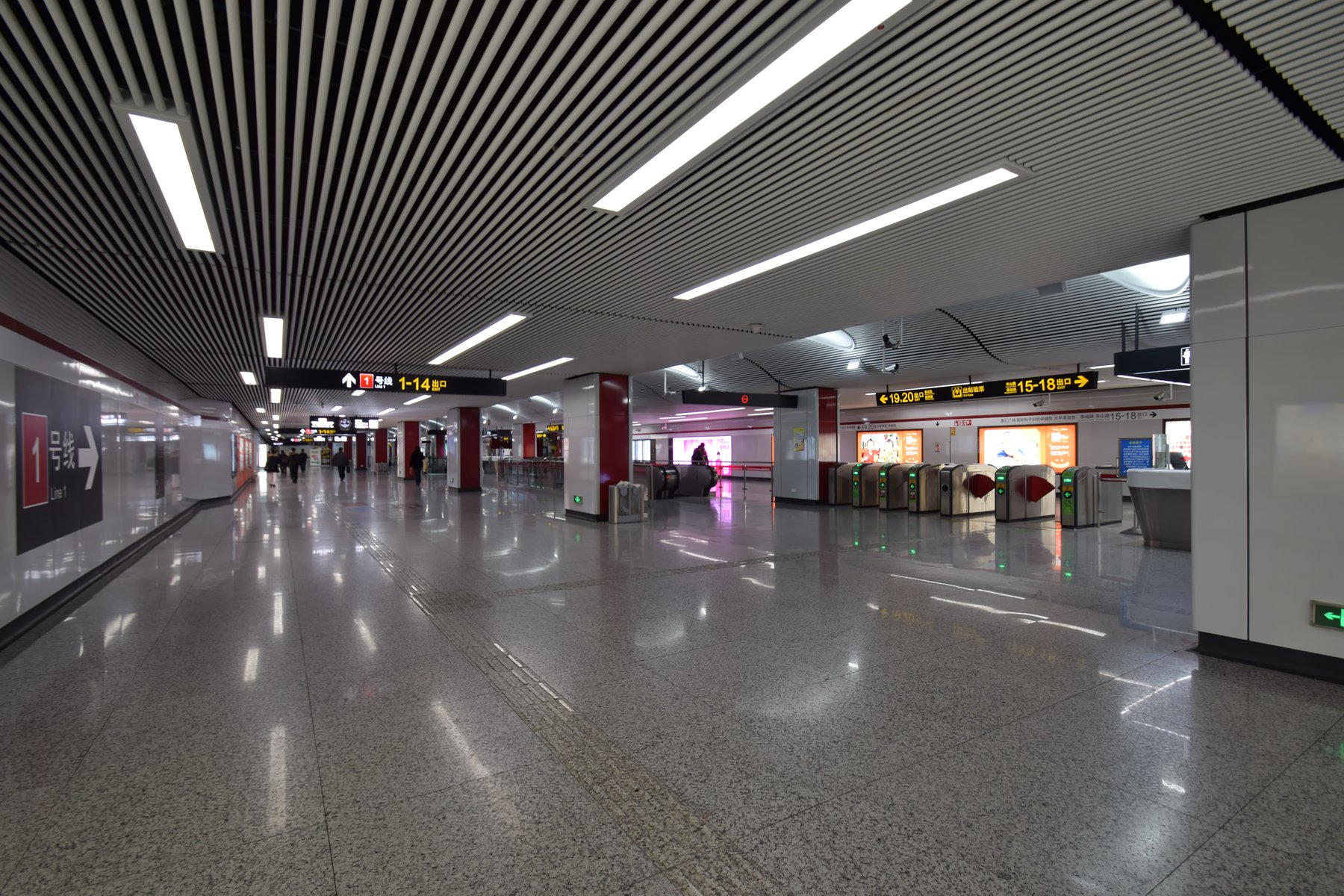
Concourse of Line 11

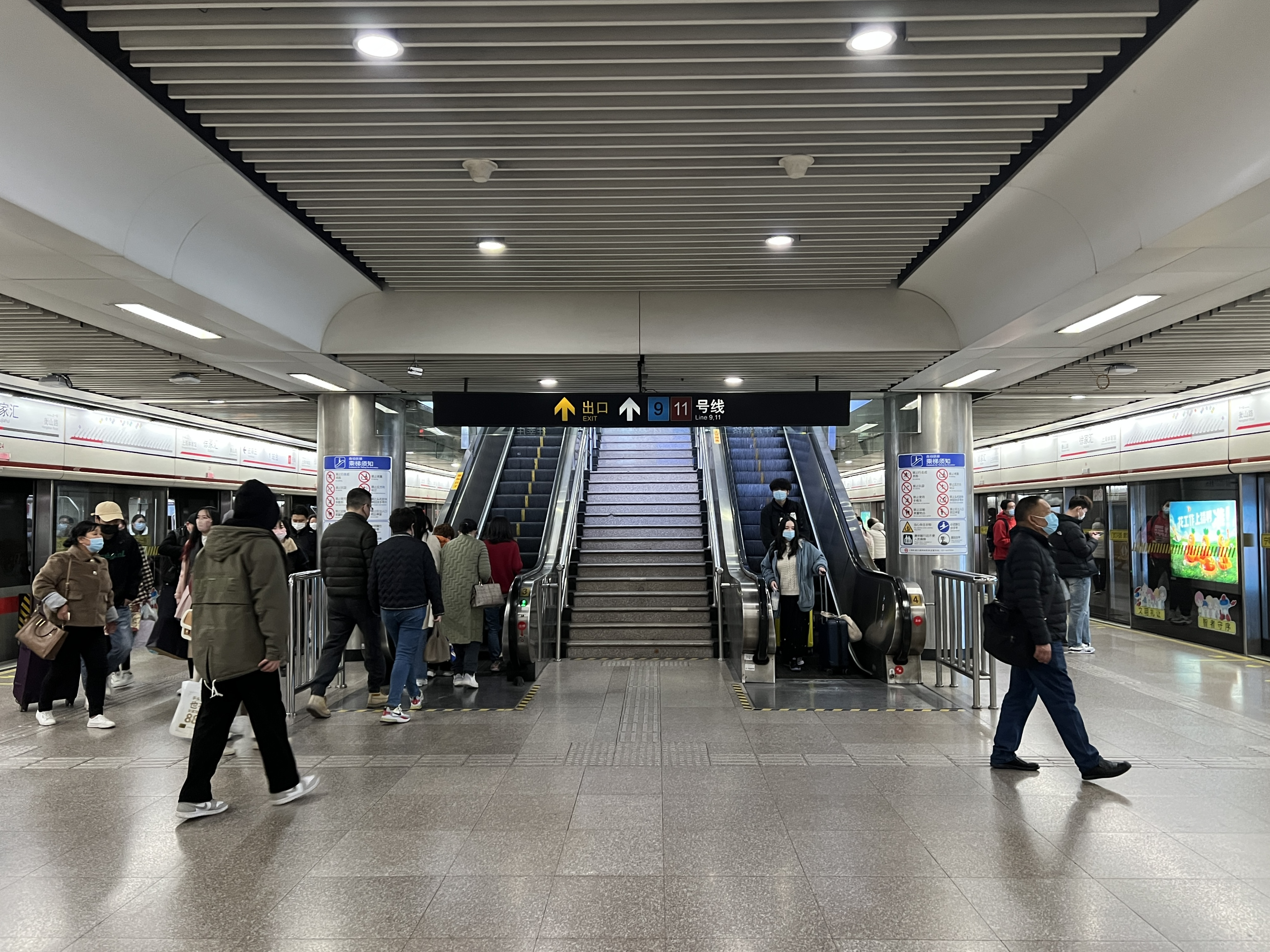
Platform of Line 1 in 2023

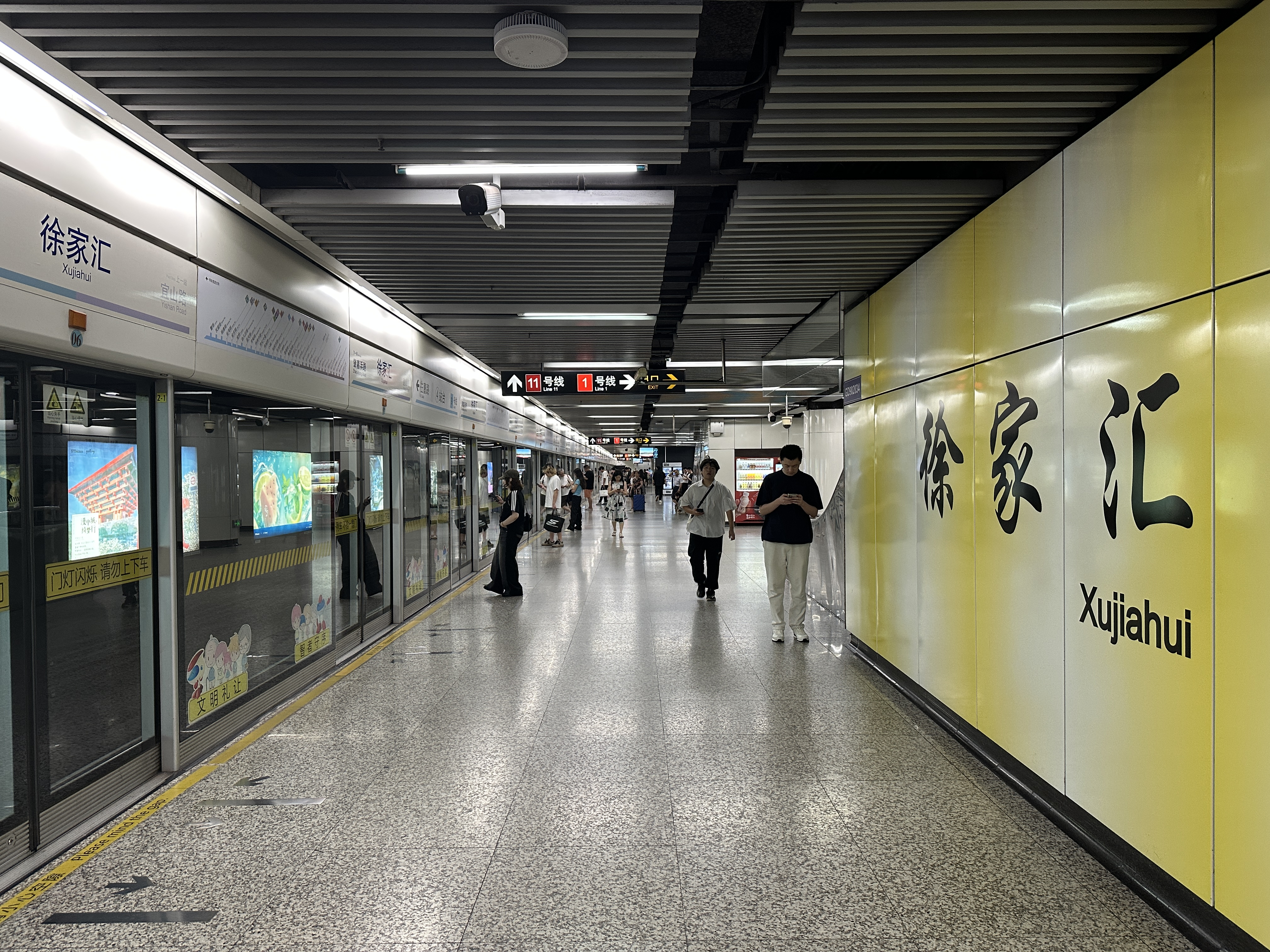
Platform of Line 9 in 2025

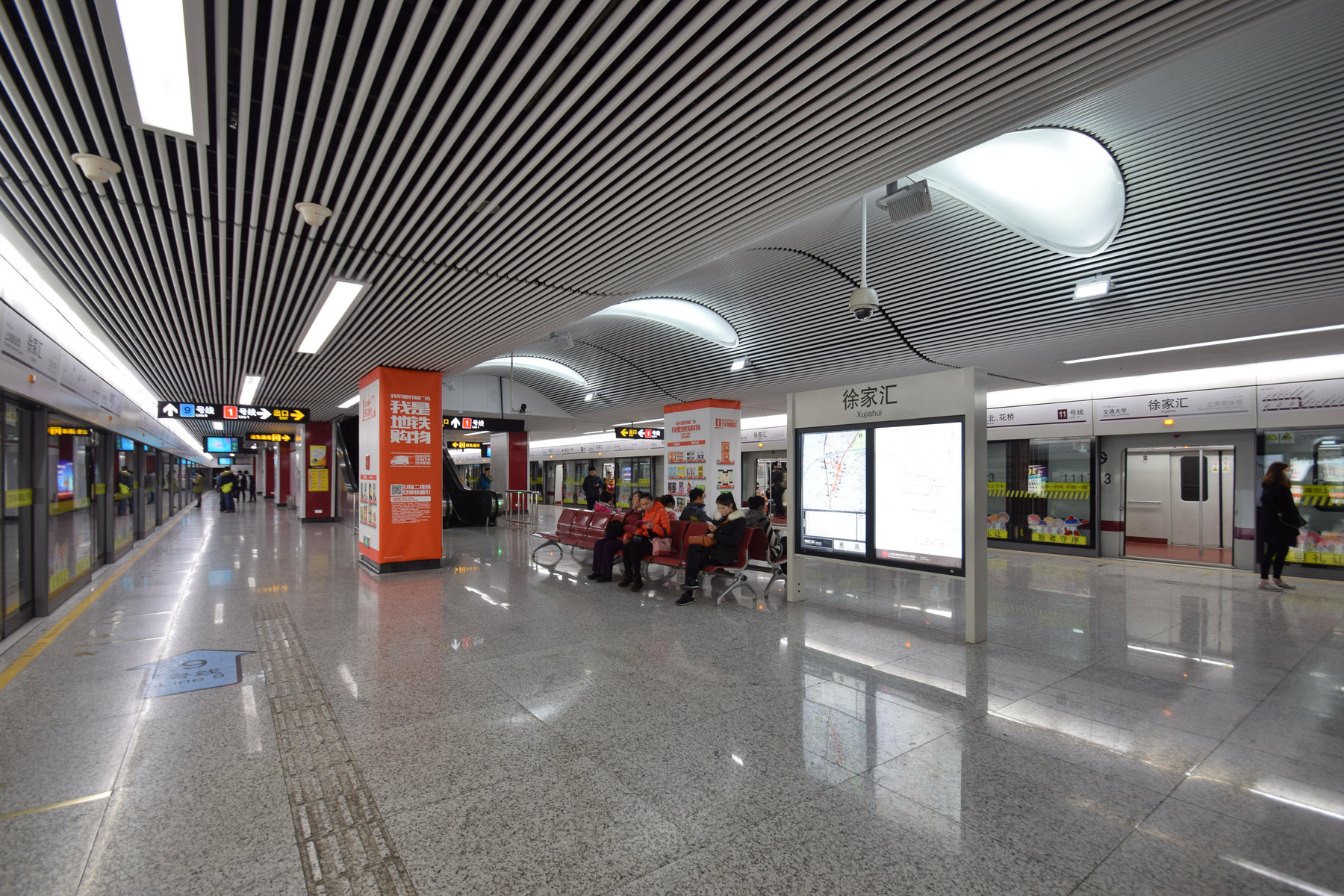
Platform of Line 11
