= Shanghai Stadium =

Sports stadium in Shanghai, China

Shanghai Stadium 上海体育场
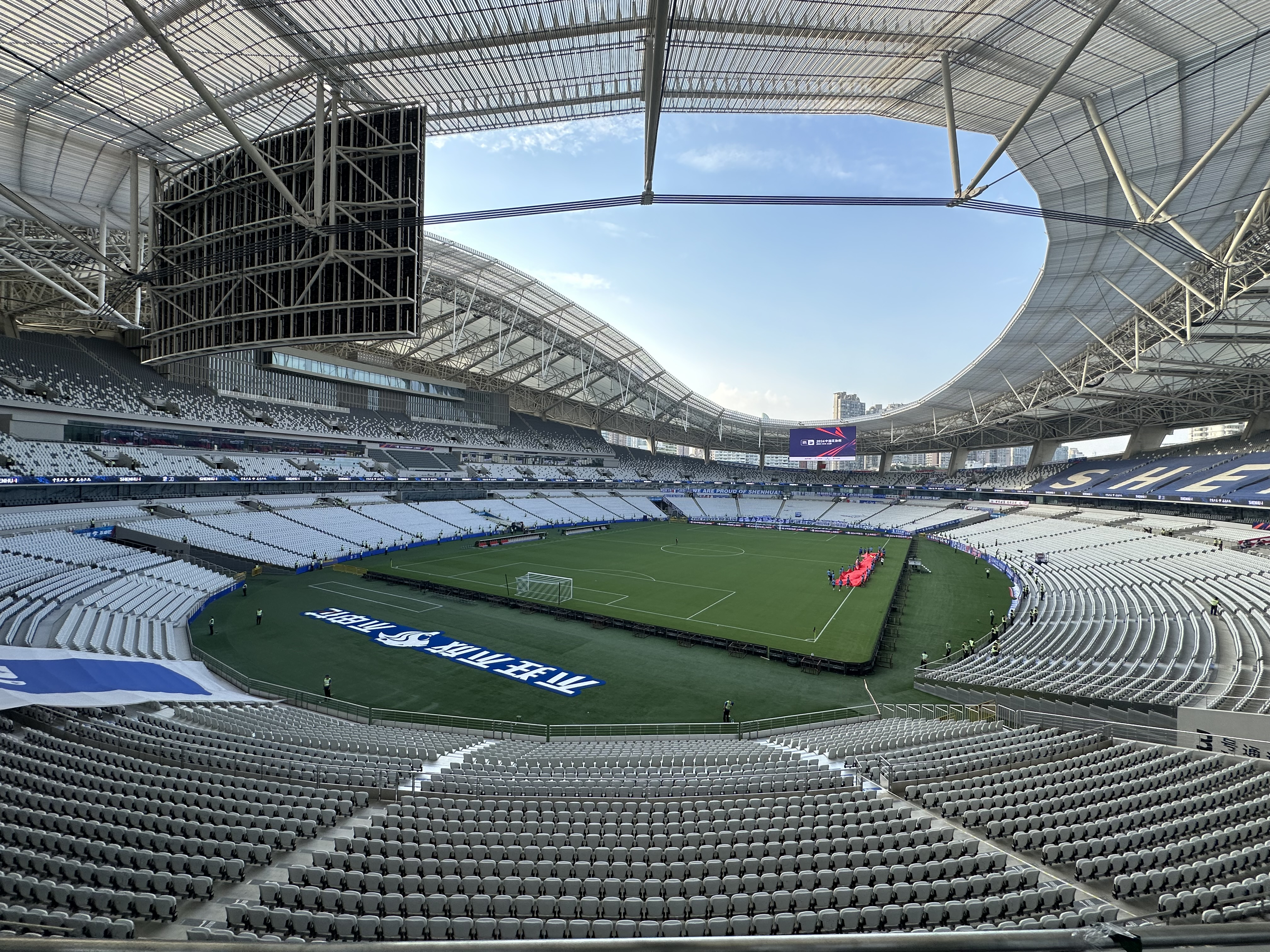
- Shanghai Stadium in 2024
- Interactive map of Shanghai Stadium 上海体育场
- Location: Xuhui District, Shanghai, China
- Coordinates: 31°11′0.61″N 121°26′14.28″E
- Capacity: 72,000
- Surface: Grass
- Public transit: Shanghai Stadium 4 Shanghai Indoor Stadium 1 4 Shanghai Swimming Center 11

Construction
- Opened: 1997
- Renovated: 2020–2022

Tenants
- Shanghai Shenhua (1998, 2023–present); Shanghai COSCO Huili (2001–2005); Shanghai SIPG (2009–2019)

The Shanghai Stadium (Chinese: 上海体育场; pinyin: Shanghai Tiyuchang) is a converted football-specific stadium in Shanghai, China. Between 2009 and 2019, the stadium hosted home matches of the Chinese Super League team Shanghai SIPG, and has been the current home of Shanghai Shenhua since 2023.

== History ==
The stadium opened in 1997, when the Eighth National Games of China were held in Shanghai. It was used for football preliminaries at the 2008 Summer Olympics. Shanghai Stadium was also the venue for the opening ceremony of the 2007 Special Olympics World Summer Games. The stadium hosted the 2015 Supercoppa Italiana match between Juventus and Lazio on 8 August 2015.

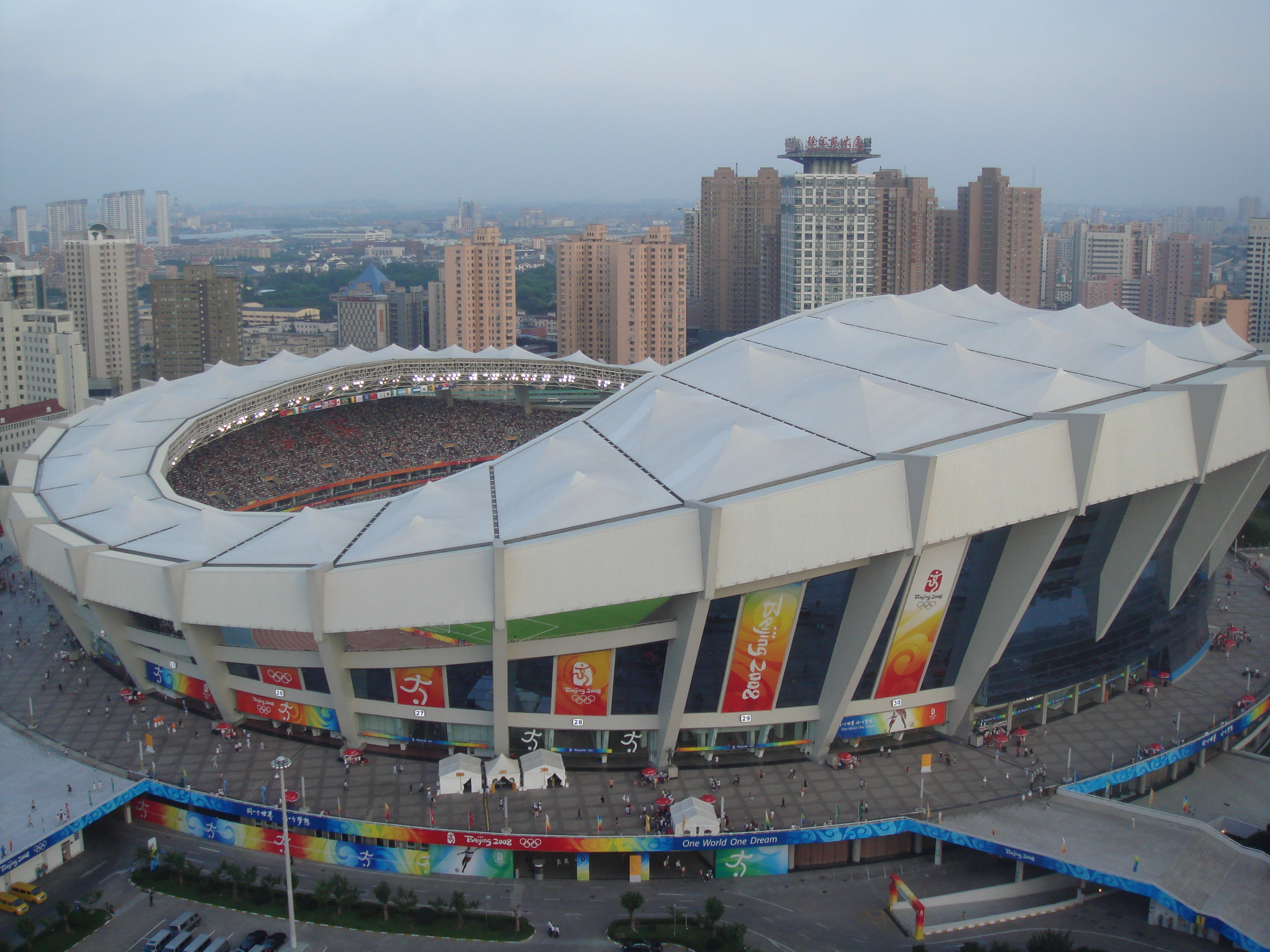
Shanghai Stadium in 2008, before the major reconstruction

Between 2020 and 2022, the stadium was completely reconstructed, and the capacity increased from 56,842 to 72,000. The running track was also removed as the venue was converted into a football-specific stadium.

== Transport ==
The Shanghai Stadium can be reached by taking Line 4 and exiting at Shanghai Stadium or Shanghai Indoor Stadium Station.

== See also ==
- Venues of the 2008 Summer Olympics
