= Hongqiao Road station =

Shanghai Metro interchange station

Hongqiao Road 虹桥路
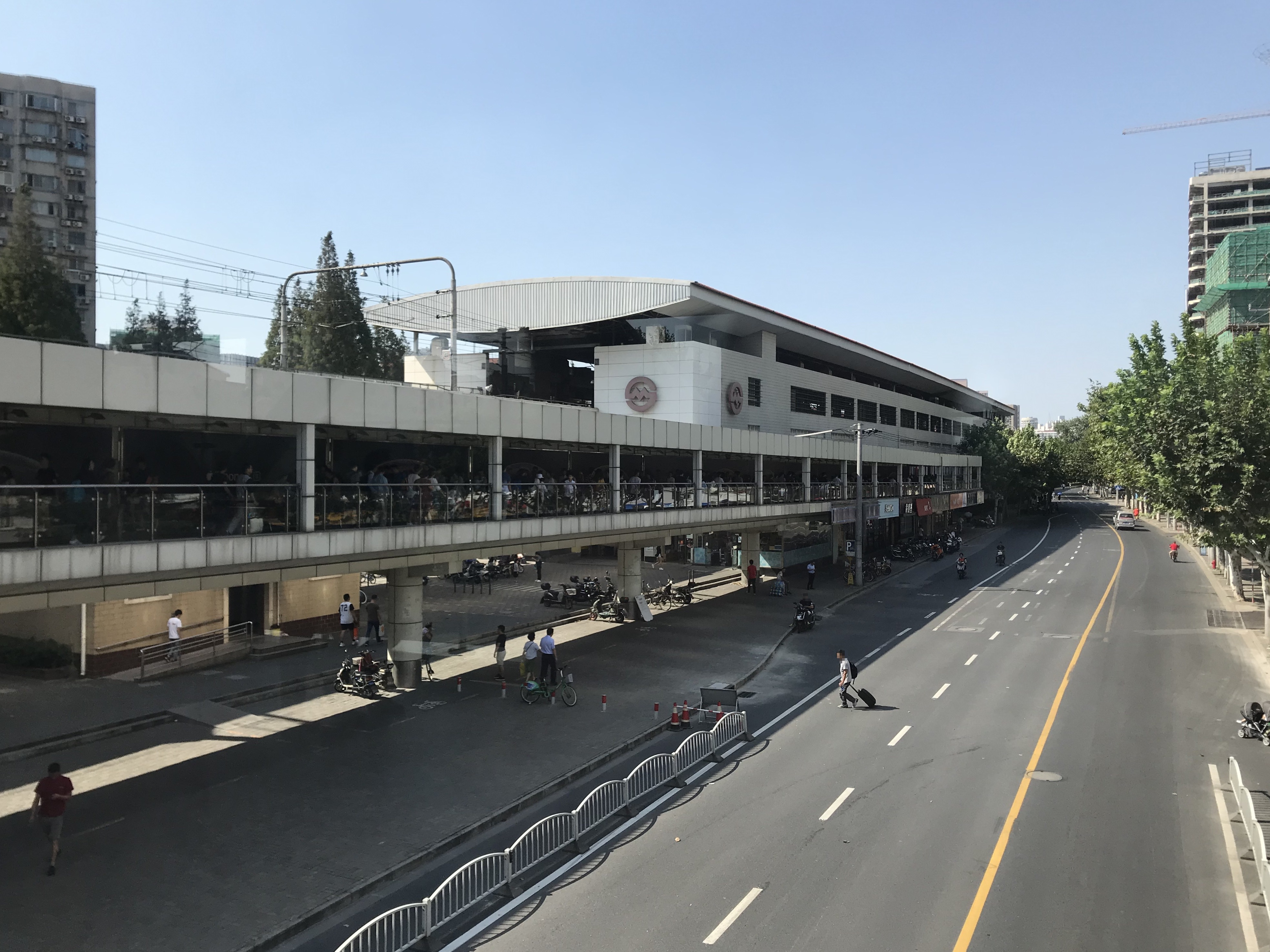
- Lines 3 & 4 station exterior

General information
- Location: Kaixuan Road (凯旋路) and Hongqiao Road; Changning District, Shanghai; China
- Coordinates: 31°11′51″N 121°25′15″E
- Operator: Shanghai No. 1/3 Metro Operation Co. Ltd.
- Lines: Line 3; Line 4; Line 10
- Platforms: 4 (1 island platform for Line 10 and 2 side platforms for Lines 3 & 4)
- Tracks: 4

Construction
- Structure type: Elevated (Lines 3 & 4); Underground (Line 10)
- Accessible: Yes

Other information
- Station code: L10/09 (Line 10)

History
- Opened: 26 December 2000; 25 years ago (Line 3); 31 December 2005; 20 years ago (Line 4); 10 April 2010; 16 years ago (Line 10)

Services
| Preceding station | Shanghai Metro | Following station |
|---|---|---|
| West Yan'an Road towards North Jiangyang Road | Line 3 | Yishan Road towards Shanghai South Railway Station |
| West Yan'an Road Clockwise | Line 4 | Yishan Road Counter-clockwise |
| Songyuan Road towards Hongqiao Railway Station or Hangzhong Road | Line 10 | Jiao Tong University towards Jilong Road |
Location
- Location within Shanghai

Hongqiao Road (simplified Chinese: 虹桥路; traditional Chinese: 虹橋路; pinyin: Hóngqiáo Lù) is an interchange station between Lines 3, 4 and 10 on the Shanghai Metro. It is the southernmost station of which Lines 3 and 4 share the same tracks. The station opened on 26 December 2000 as part of the initial section of Line 3 from Shanghai South Railway Station to Jiangwan Town, and Line 4 service began here on the final day of 2005. The interchange with Line 10 opened on 10 April 2010.

The station is located in Changning District, Shanghai.

== Station layout ==
| 3F | Side platform, doors open on the right |
| 3F | | ← Line 3 towards North Jiangyang Road (West Yan'an Road) ← Line 4 clockwise (West Yan'an Road) |
| 3F | | Line 3 towards Shanghai South Railway Station (Yishan Road) → Line 4 counter-clockwise (Yishan Road) → |
| 3F | Side platform, doors open on the right |
| 2F | Lines 3 & 4 concourse | Tickets, Service Center |
| 1F | Ground level | Exits |
| B1 | Line 10 concourse | Tickets, Service Center |
| B2 | Platform 1 | ← Line 10 towards Hongqiao Railway Station or Hangzhong Road (Songyuan Road) |
| B2 | Island platform, doors open on the left |
| B2 | Platform 2 | Line 10 towards Jilong Road (Jiao Tong University) → |

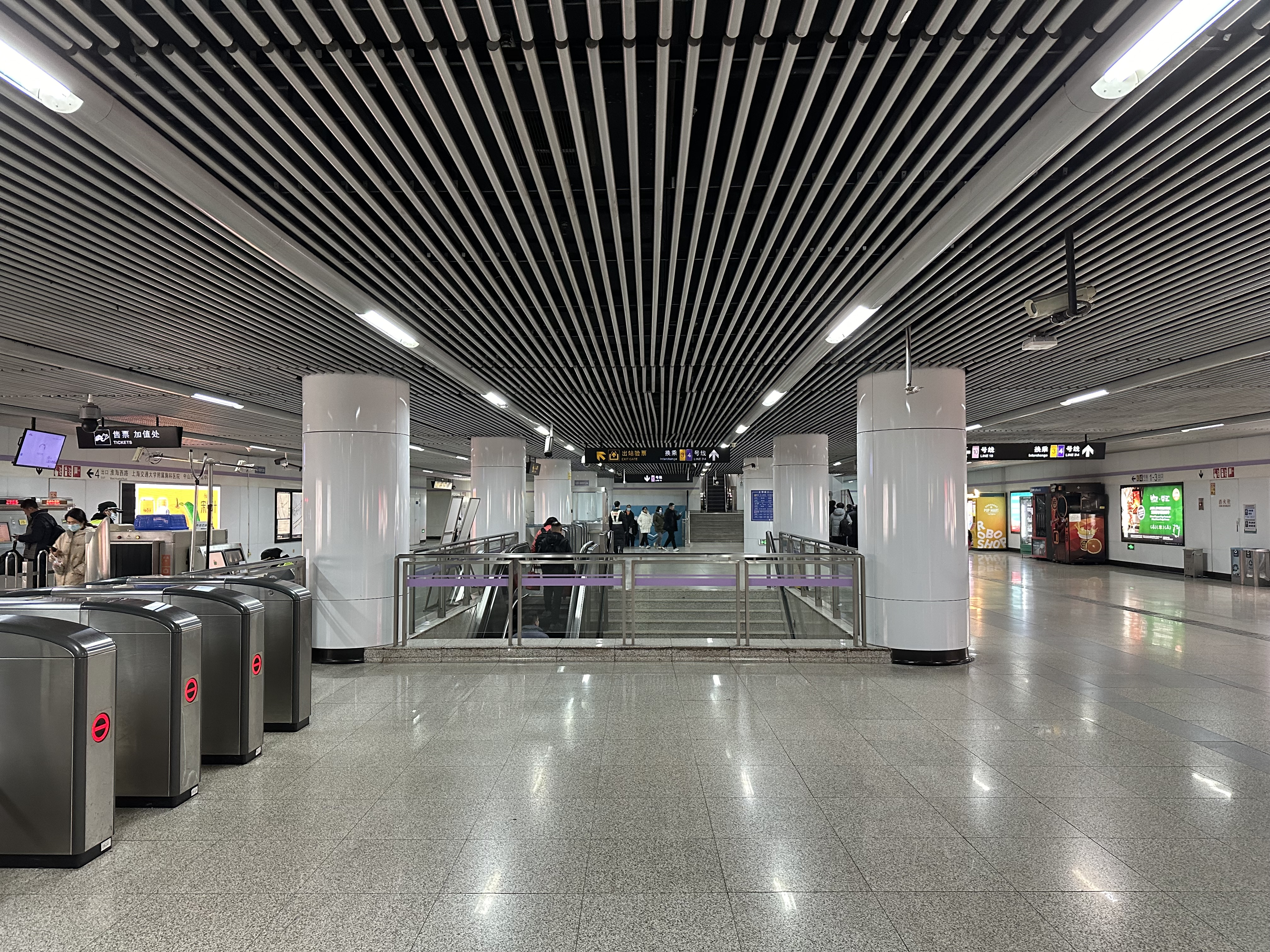
Concourse of Line 10

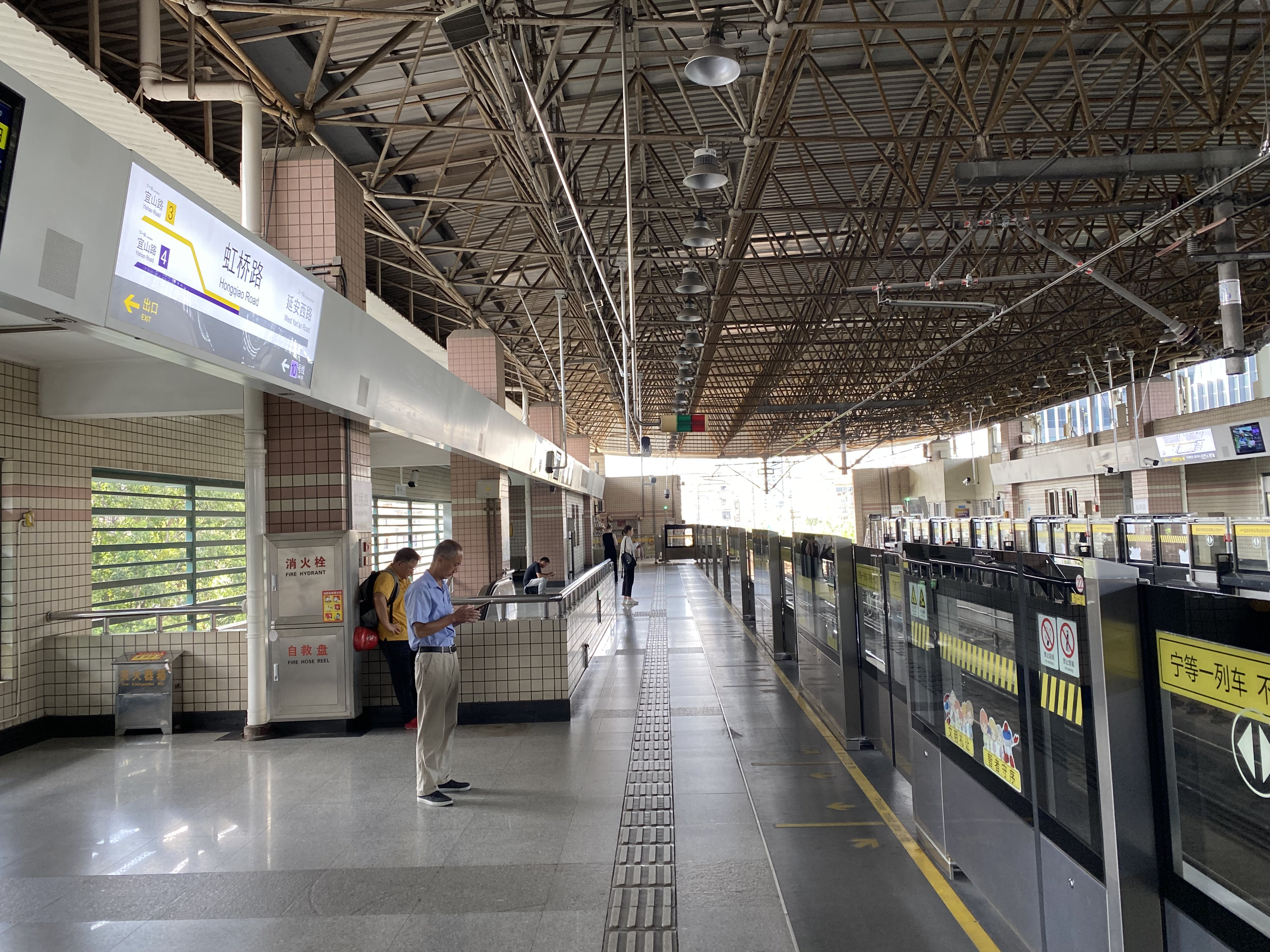
Platform for Lines 3 and 4

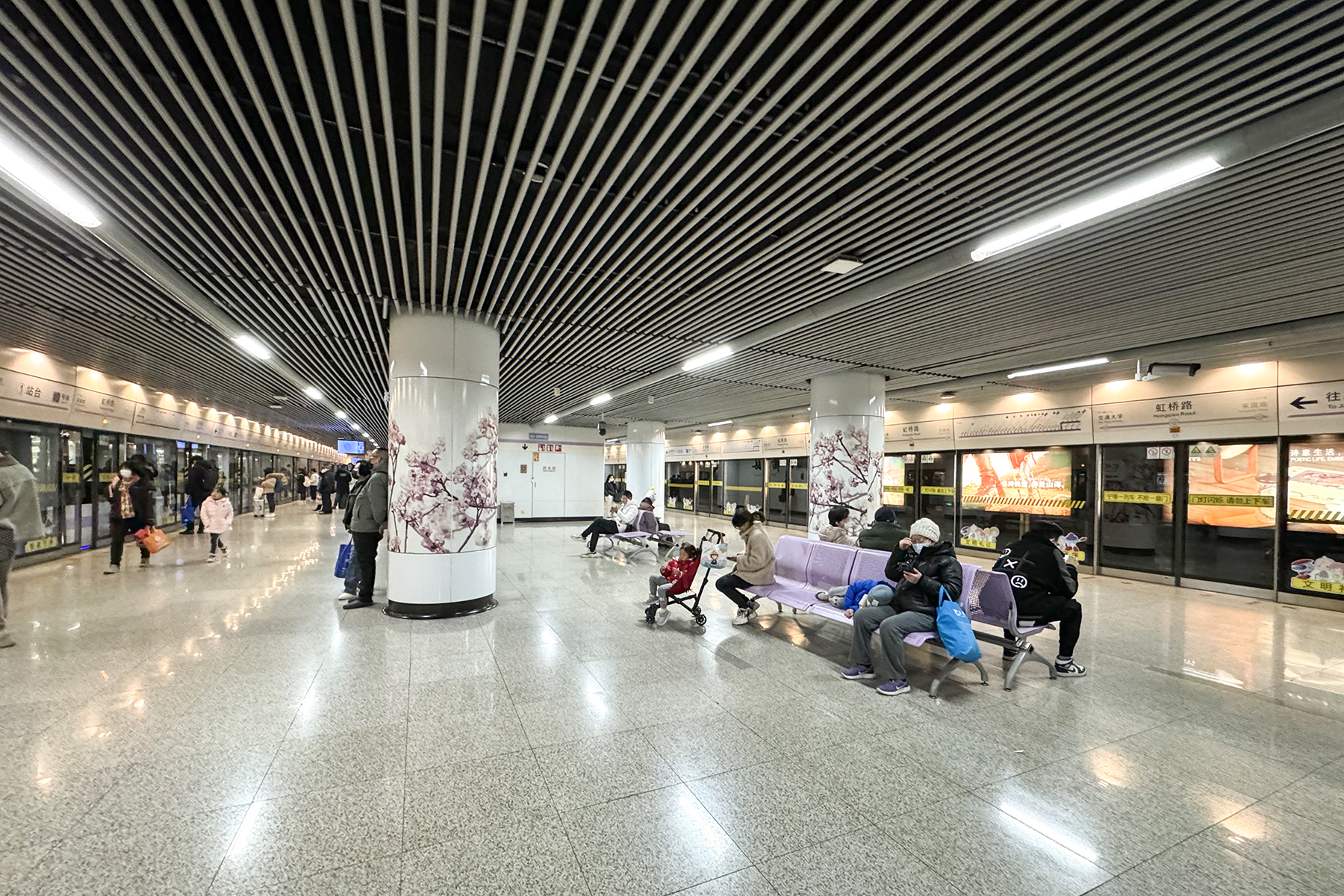
Platform of Line 10

=== Entrances/exits ===
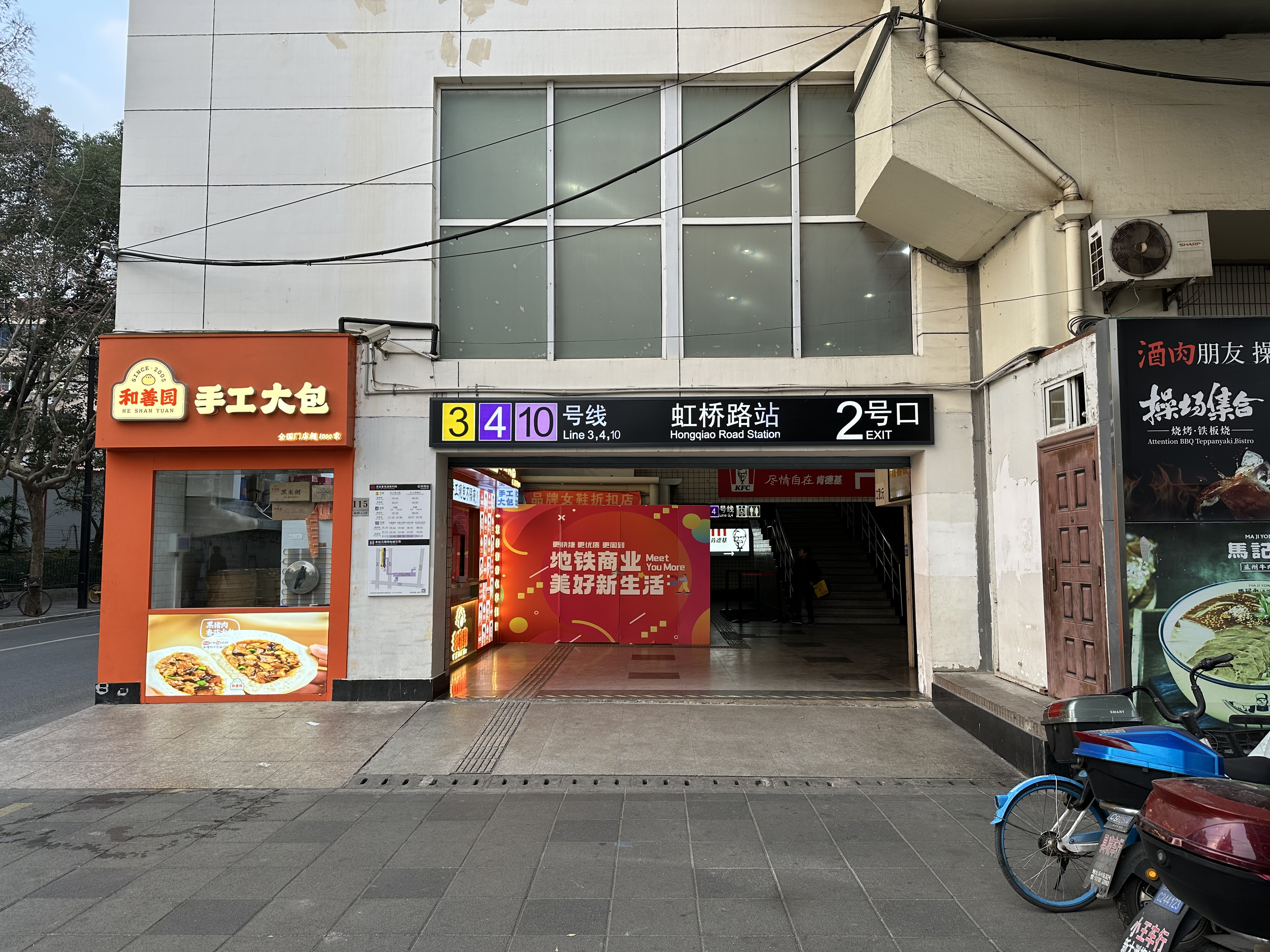
Exit 2

Hongqiao Road has five exits. Exit 1-3 connect lines 3 and 4. Exits 4 and 6 connect line 10.

- 1: Kaixuan Road, Kaitian Road
- 2: Kaixuan Road, Hongqiao Road
- 3: Kaixuan Road
- 4: West Huaihai Road, Kaitian Road
- 6: Kaixuan Road, Hongqiao Road
