= Yishan Road station =

Shanghai Metro interchange station

Yishan Road 宜山路
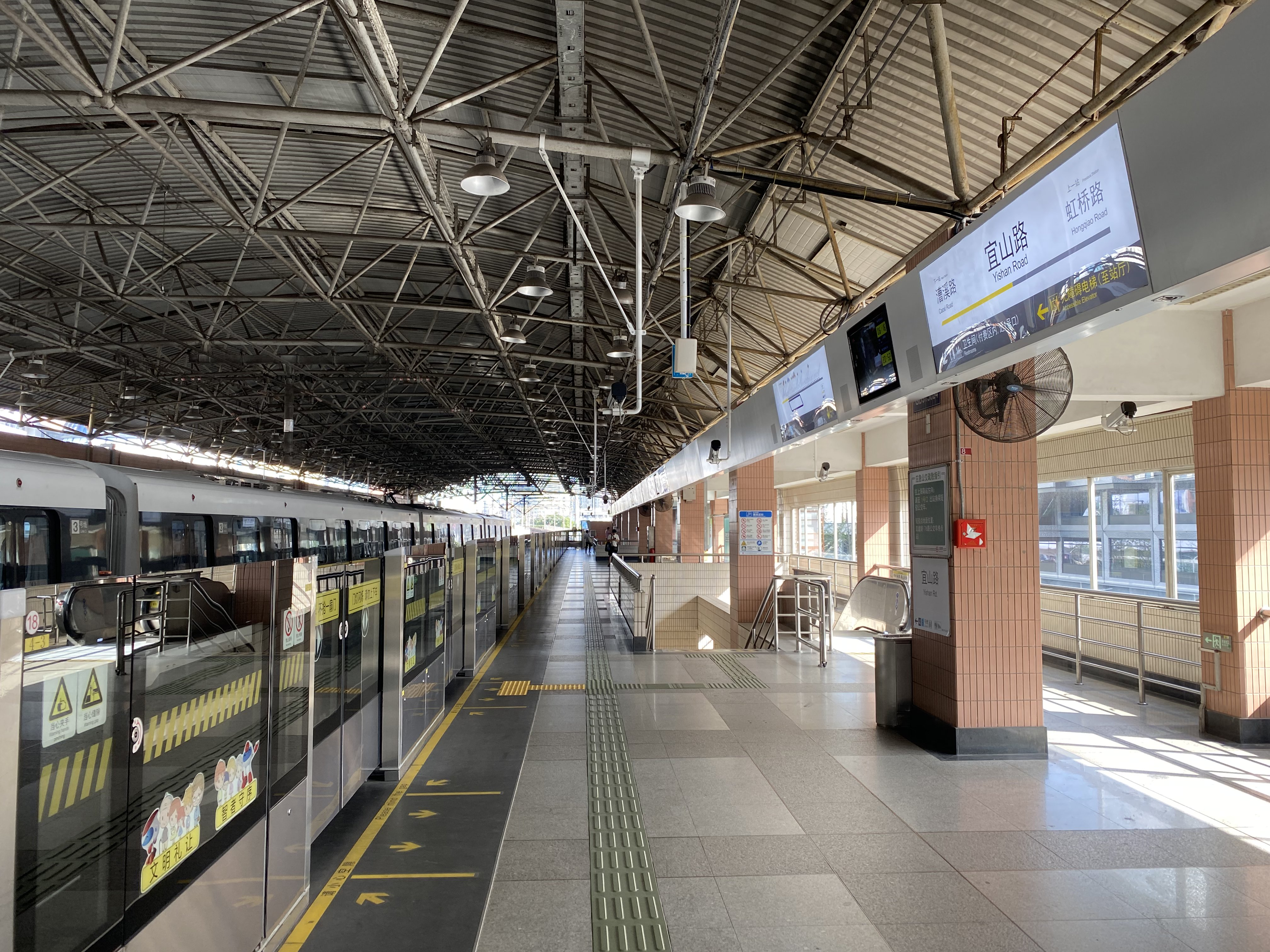
- Line 3 platform

General information
- Location: Kaixuan Road (凯旋路) and Yishan Road (宜山路); Xuhui District, Shanghai; China
- Coordinates: 31°11′11″N 121°25′39″E
- Operator: Shanghai No. 1/3 Metro Operation Co. Ltd.
- Lines: Line 3; Line 4; Line 9
- Platforms: 6 (2 island platforms for Lines 4 & 9 and 2 side platforms for Line 3)
- Tracks: 6

Construction
- Structure type: Underground (Lines 4 & 9); Elevated (Line 3)
- Accessible: Yes

History
- Opened: 26 December 2000; 25 years ago (Line 3); 31 December 2005; 20 years ago (Line 4); 31 December 2009; 16 years ago (Line 9)

Services
Preceding station	Shanghai Metro	Following station
Hongqiao Road towards North Jiangyang Road	Line 3	Caoxi Road towards Shanghai South Railway Station
Hongqiao Road Clockwise	Line 4	Shanghai Indoor Stadium Counter-clockwise
Guilin Road towards Shanghai Songjiang Railway Station	Line 9	Xujiahui towards Caolu
Location
- Location within Shanghai

Yishan Road (Chinese: 宜山路; pinyin: Yíshān Lù) is an interchange station between Lines 3, 4 and 9 on the Shanghai Metro. It is the southernmost station shared by Line 3 and Line 4, although the two lines do not share tracks (the Line 4 station is underground).

The station opened on 26 December 2000 as part of the initial section of Line 3, from Shanghai South Railway Station to Jiangwan Town. The interchange with Line 4 opened on the final day of 2005, and the interchange with Line 9 opened on the final day of 2009 as part of that line's downtown section from Yishan Road to Century Avenue.

While the Line 4 platform was formerly in a separate area from the platforms of Lines 3 and 9, the three platforms of all three lines are now connected via an underground passageway.

== Station layout ==
3F	Side platform, doors open on the right
3F		← Line 3 towards North Jiangyang Road (Hongqiao Road)
3F		Line 3 towards Shanghai South Railway Station (Caoxi Road) →
3F	Side platform, doors open on the right
2F	Line 3 concourse	Tickets, Service Center
1F	Exit 1 concourse	Exit 1, Tickets, Service Center, Restrooms
1F	Ground level	Exitx 2-11
B1	Line 4 concourse	Tickets, Service Center
B2	Platform 2	← Line 4 clockwise (Hongqiao Road)
B2	Island platform, doors open on the left
B2	Platform 1	Line 4 counter-clockwise (Shanghai Indoor Stadium) →
B2	Line 9 upper concourse	Restrooms
B3	Line 9 lower concourse	Tickets, Service Center, interchange to lines 3 and 4
B4	Platform 1	← Line 9 towards Shanghai Songjiang Railway Station (Guilin Road)
B4	Island platform, doors open on the left
B4	Platform 2	Line 9 towards Caolu (Xujiahui) →

=== Entrances/exits ===
- 1: Yishan Road, Xuhong Road (N), Kaixuan Road, Shiziwan Road
- 2: Yishan Road
- 3: Kaixuan Road, Yishan Road
- 4: Kaixuan Road
- 5: Kaixuan Road, Xuhong Road (N)
- 6: Kaixuan Road
- 7: Yishan Road, Kaijin Road, Kaixuan Road
- 8: Yishan Road, Zhongshan Road (W)
- 9: Yishan Road, Zhongshan Road (W)
- 10: Yishan Road, Guyi Road
- 11: Guyi Road

== Gallery ==
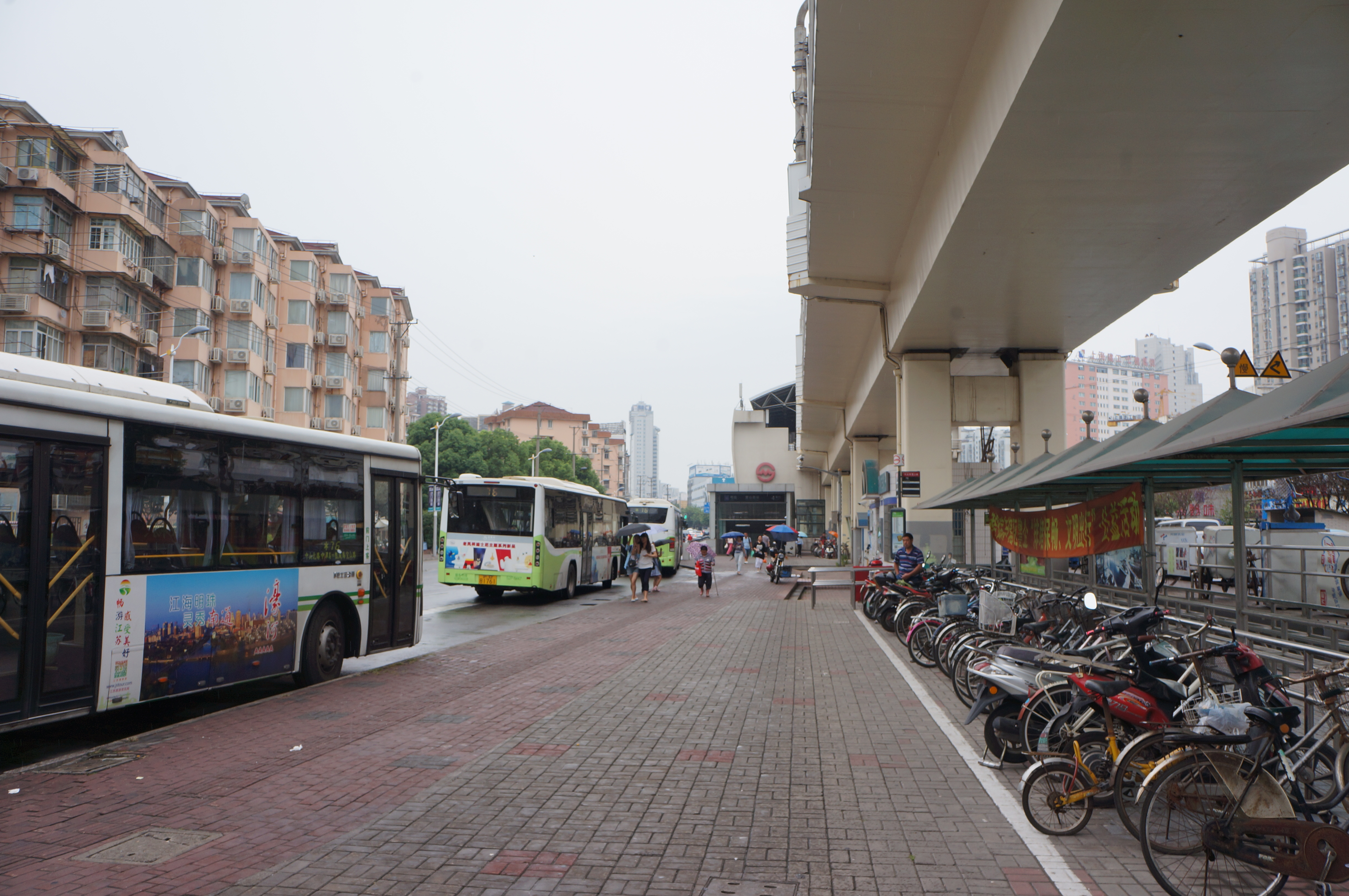
Bus Stop near Yishan Road station

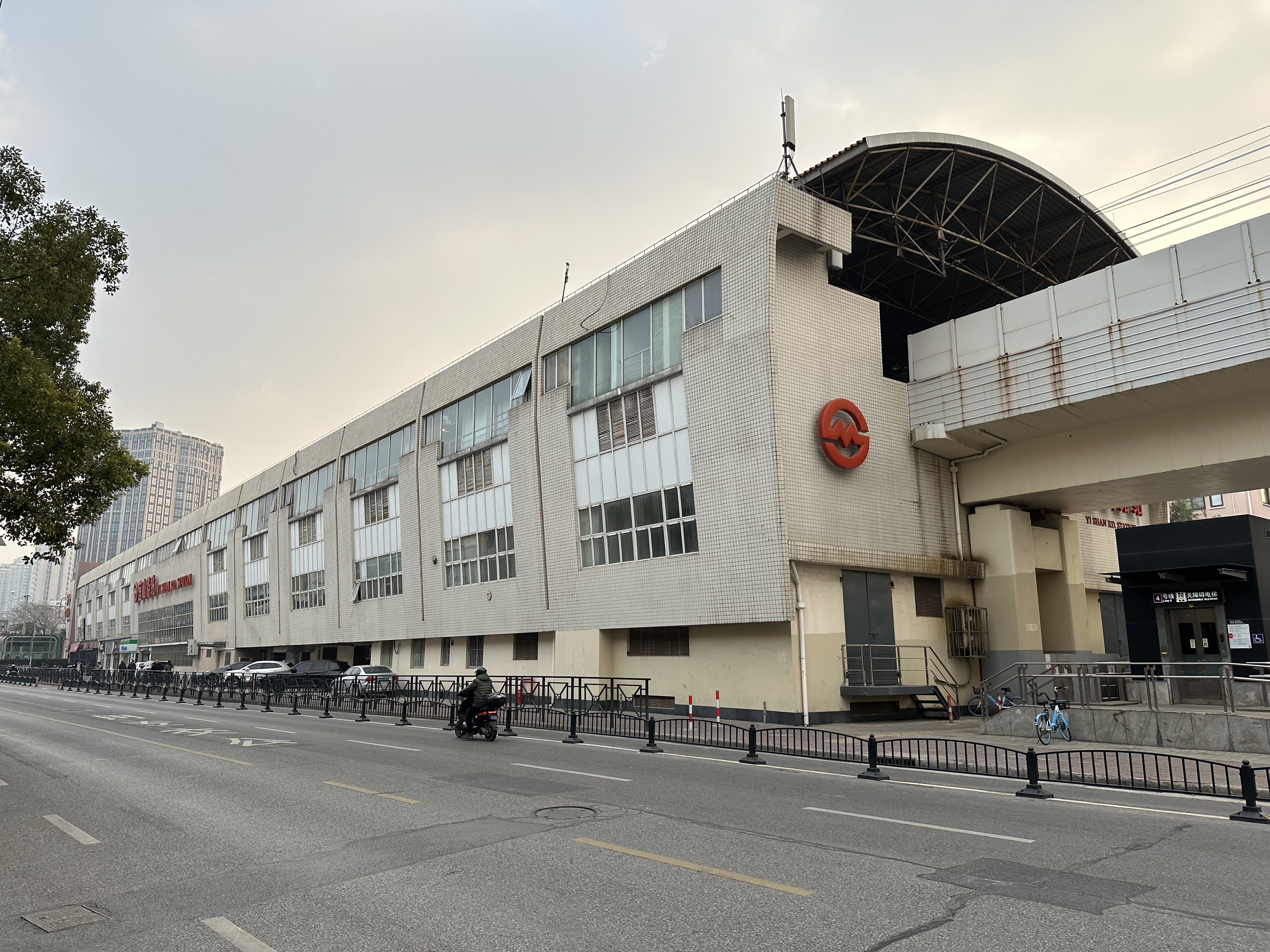
The exterior of the elevated Line 3 platform

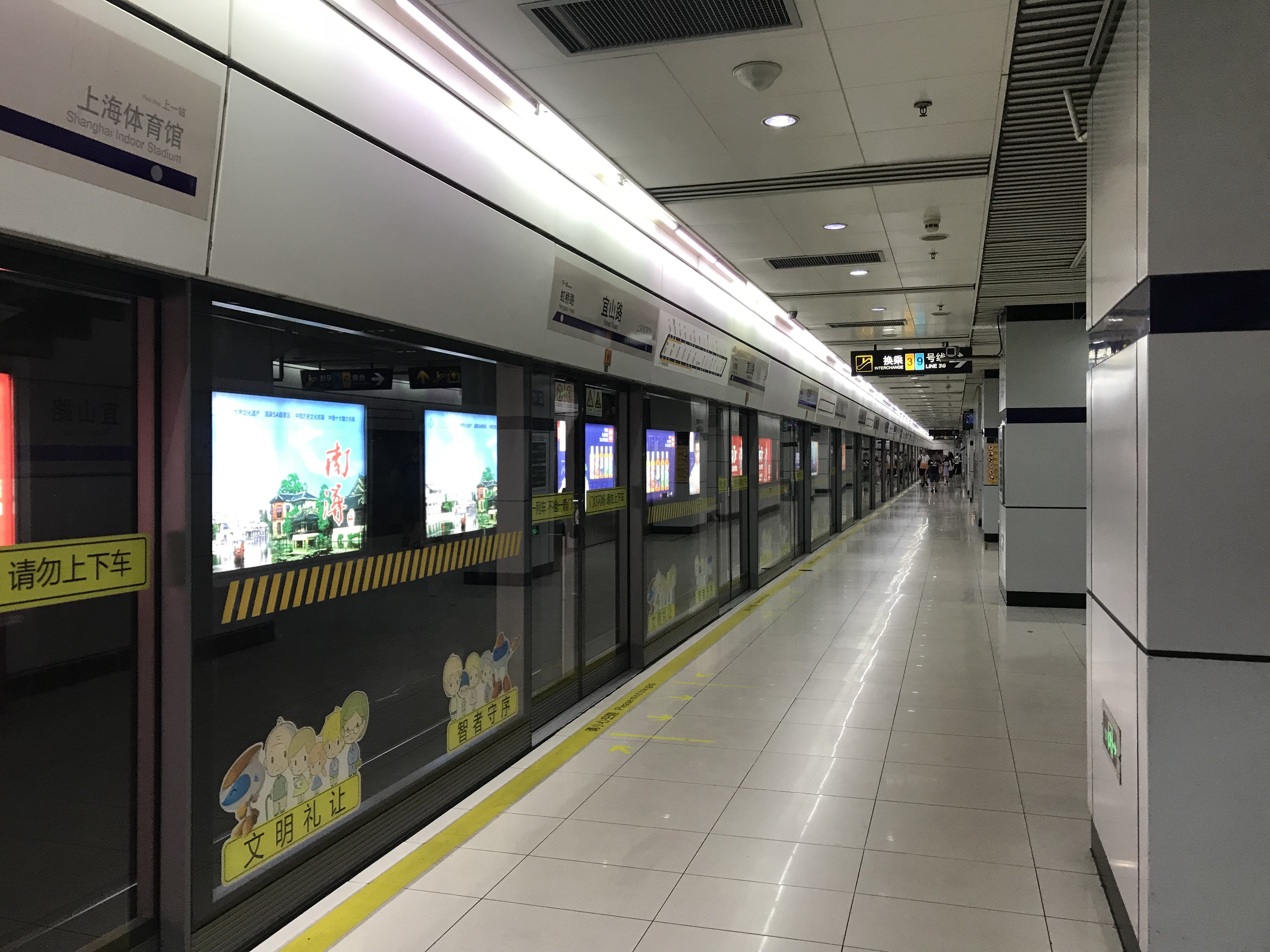
Line 4 platform

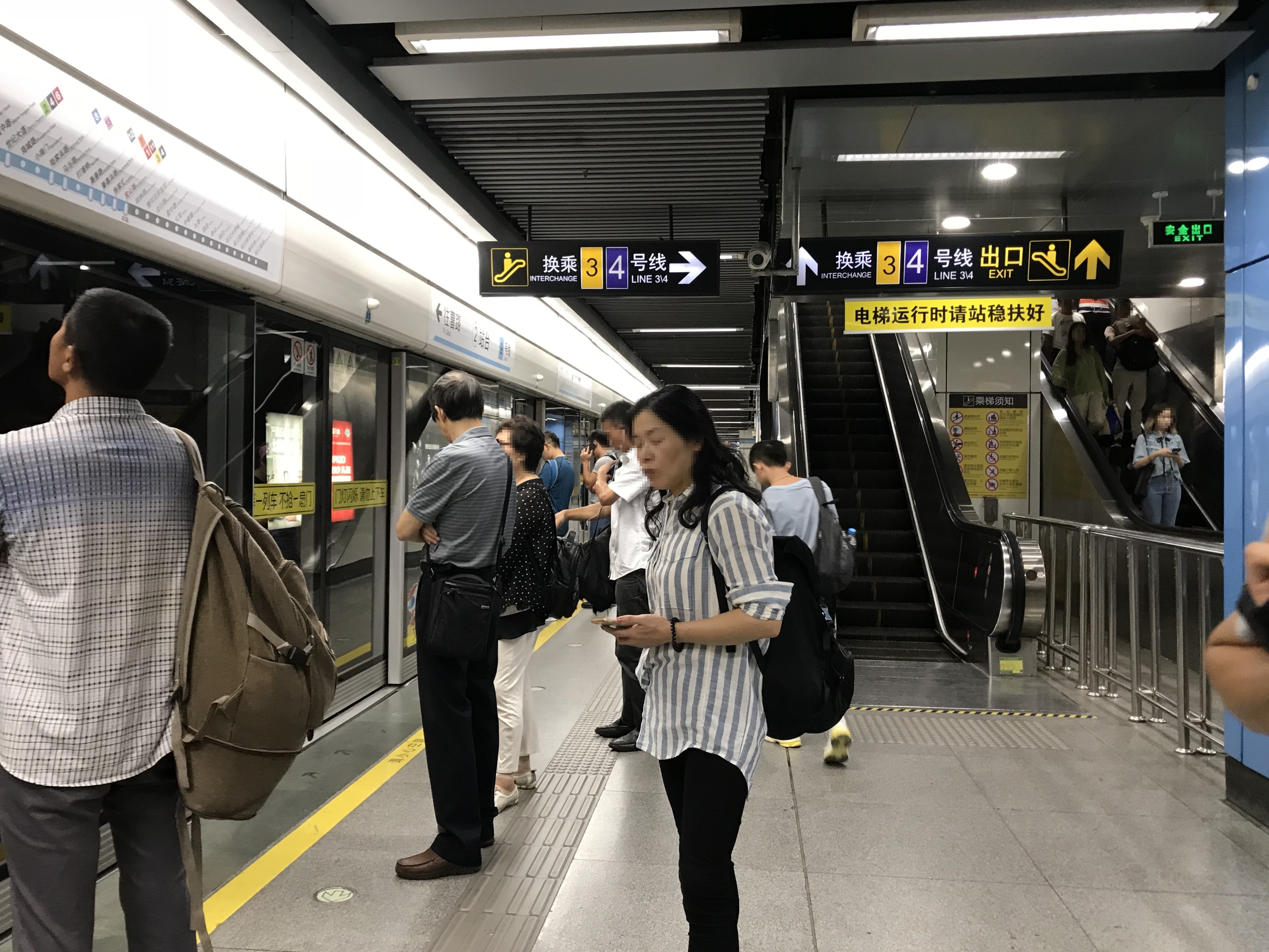
Line 9 platform

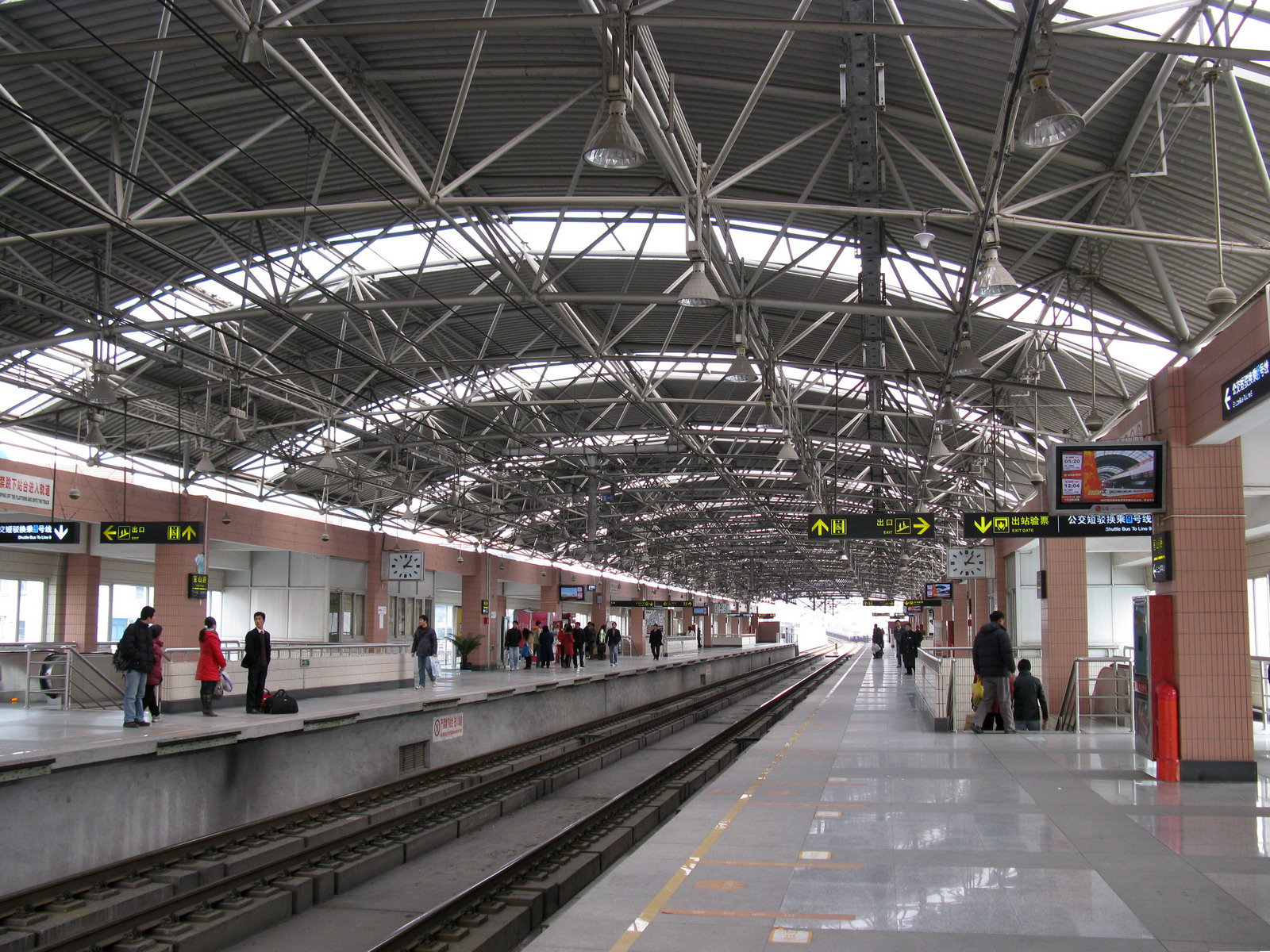
Line 3 platform in 2008
