= Jiao Tong University station =

Shanghai Metro interchange station

Jiao Tong University 交通大学
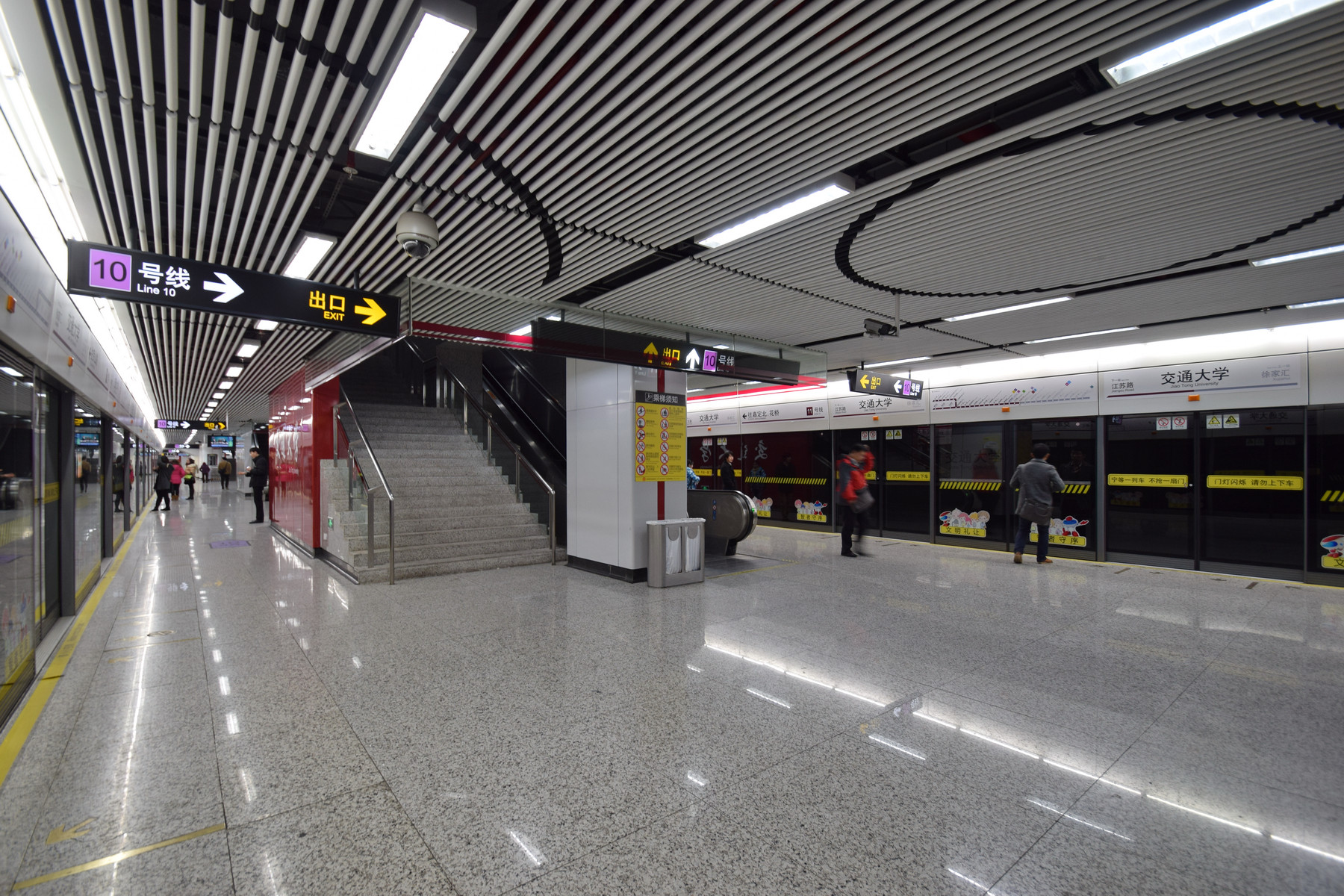
- Platform of Line 11

General information
- Location: West Huaihai Road and Huashan Road; Xuhui District and Changning District boundary, Shanghai; China
- Coordinates: 31.2039°N 121.43°E
- Operator: Shanghai No. 1/2 Metro Operation Co. Ltd.
- Lines: Line 10; Line 11
- Platforms: 4 (2 island platforms)
- Tracks: 4

Construction
- Structure type: Underground
- Accessible: Yes

Other information
- Station code: L10/10 (Line 10)

History
- Opened: 10 April 2010 (Line 10); 31 August 2013 (Line 11)

Services
Preceding station	Shanghai Metro	Following station
Hongqiao Road towards Hongqiao Railway Station or Hangzhong Road	Line 10	Shanghai Library towards Jilong Road
Jiangsu Road towards North Jiading or Huaqiao	Line 11	Xujiahui towards Disney Resort
Location
- Location within Shanghai

Jiao Tong University (simplified Chinese: 交通大学; traditional Chinese: 交通大學; pinyin: Jiāotōng Dàxué) is an interchange station between Line 10 and Line 11 of the Shanghai Metro. The station entered operation on 10 April 2010 with the operations of Line 10. It became an interchange station with Line 11 on 31 August 2013.

The famous Shanghai Jiao Tong University is located near the station, thus giving the station its name.

== Station layout ==
1F	Ground level	Exits
B1	Concourse	Tickets, Service Center
B2	Platform 1	← Line 10 towards Hongqiao Railway Station or Hangzhong Road (Hongqiao Road)
B2	Island platform, doors open on the left
B2	Platform 2	Line 10 towards Jilong Road (Shanghai Library) →
B3	Platform 3	← Line 11 towards North Jiading or Huaqiao (Jiangsu Road)
B3	Island platform, doors open on the left
B3	Platform 4	Line 11 towards Disney Resort (Xujiahui) →

=== Entrances/exits ===
- 1: Huashan Road, Huaihai Road (M)
- 2: Huashan Road
- 3: Huaihai Road (W)
- 4: Huahai Road (W)
- 5: Huaihai Road (W), Fahuazhen Road
- 6: Huashan Road, Huahai Road (W)
- 7: Huashan Road, Huaihai Road (M)

== Places nearby ==
- Shanghai Jiao Tong University

== Gallery ==
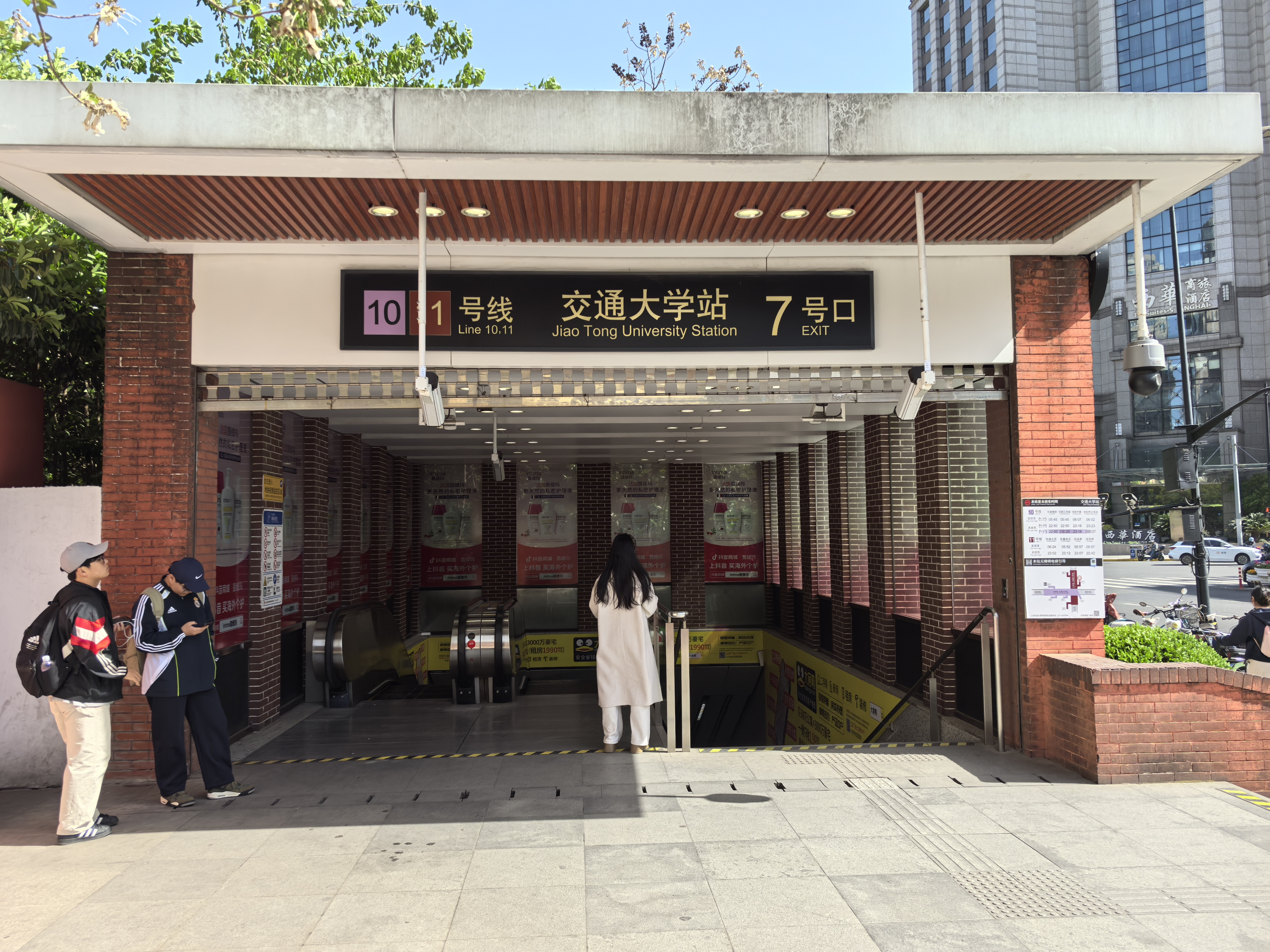
Exit 7

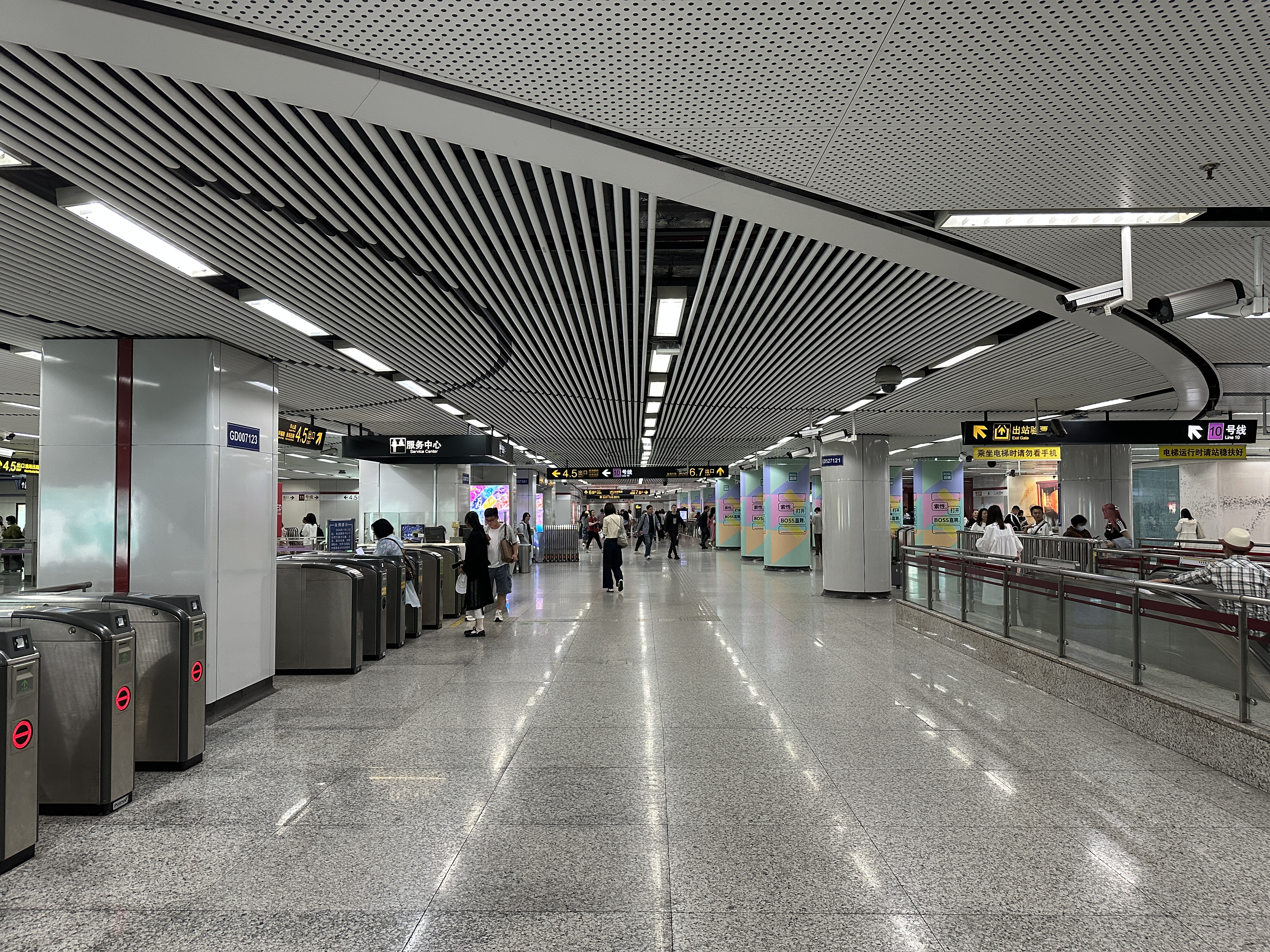
Concourse

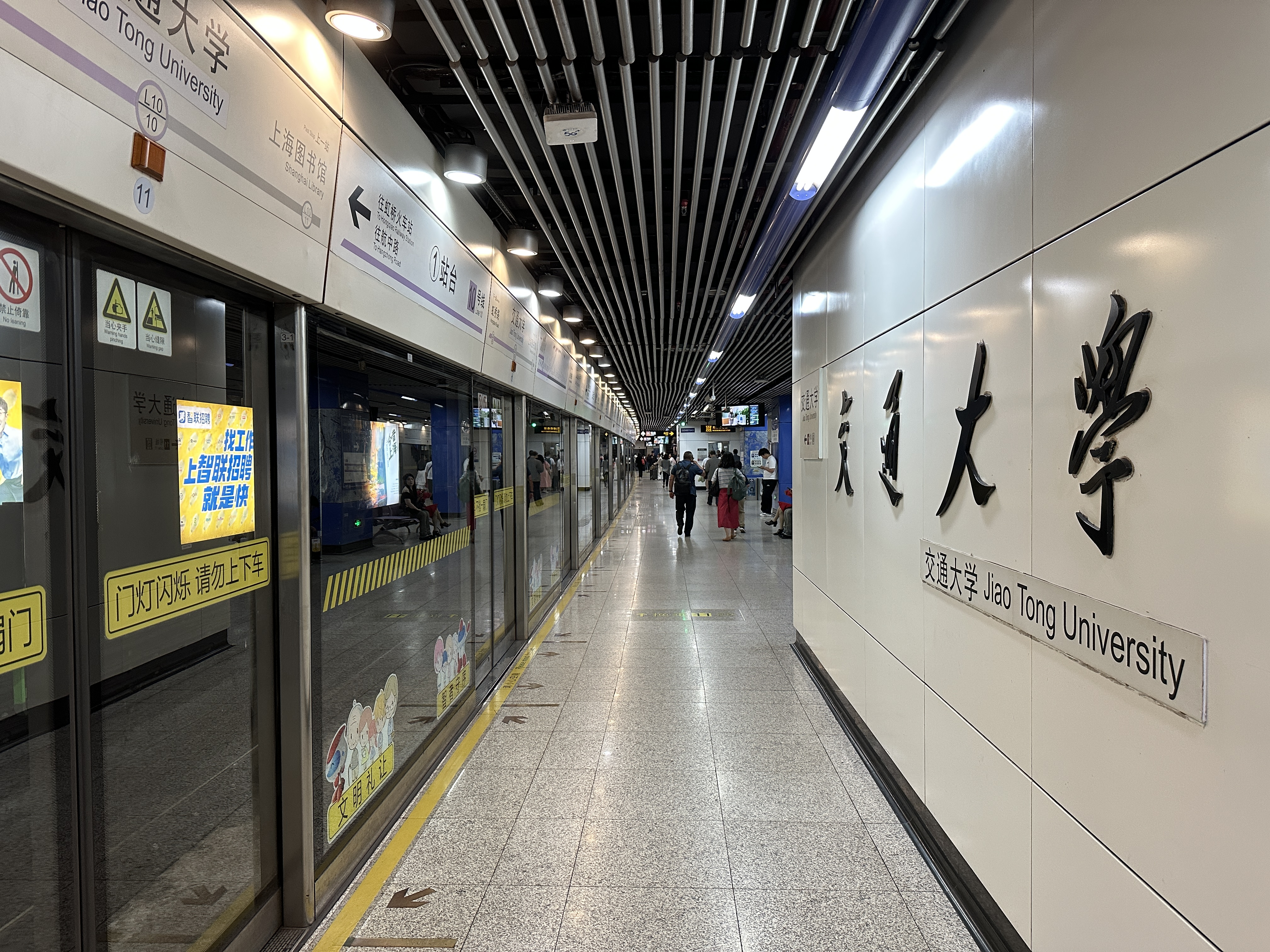
Line 10 platform

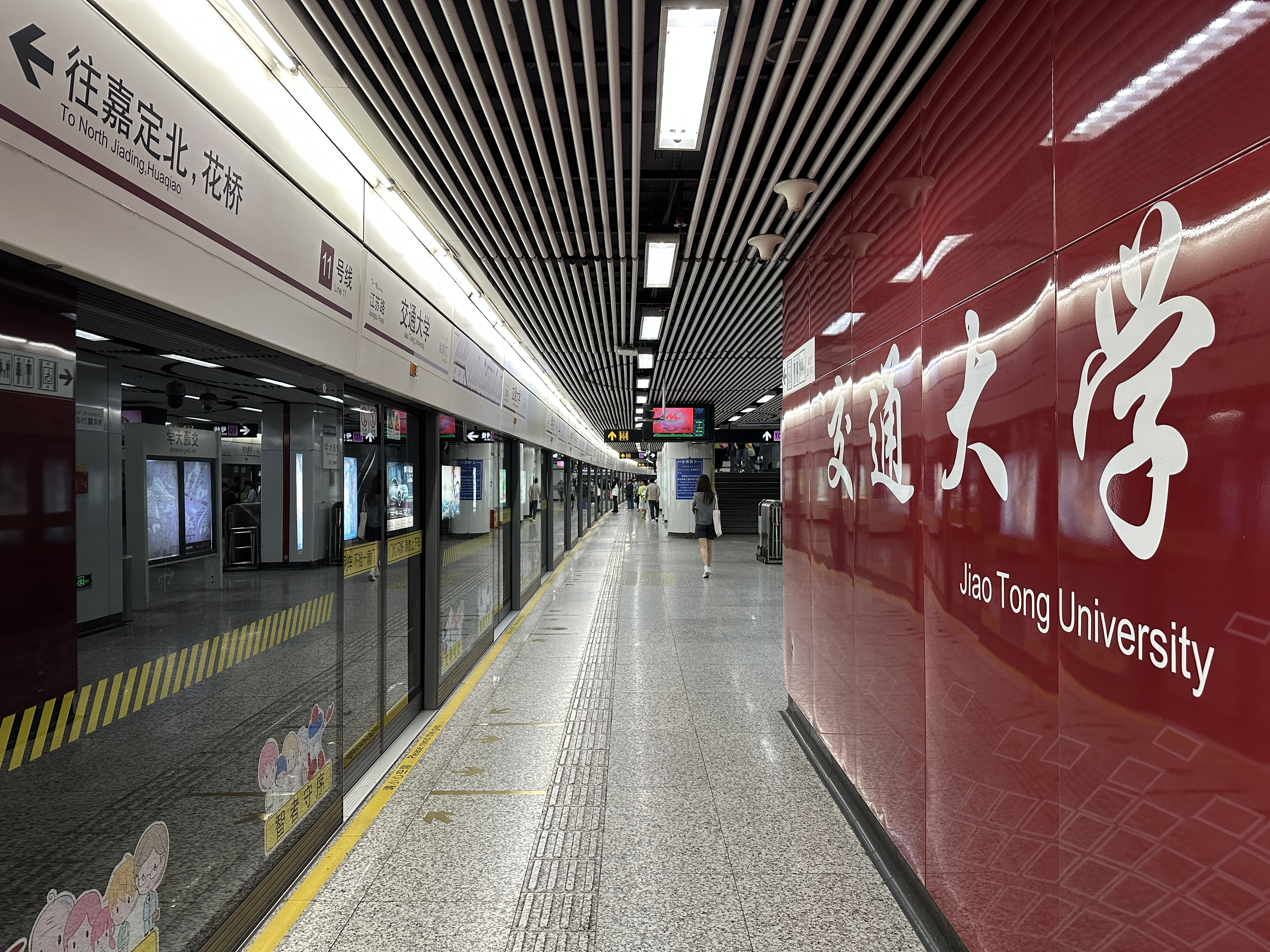
Line 11 platform
