= Caoxi Road station =

Shanghai Metro station

Caoxi Road 漕溪路
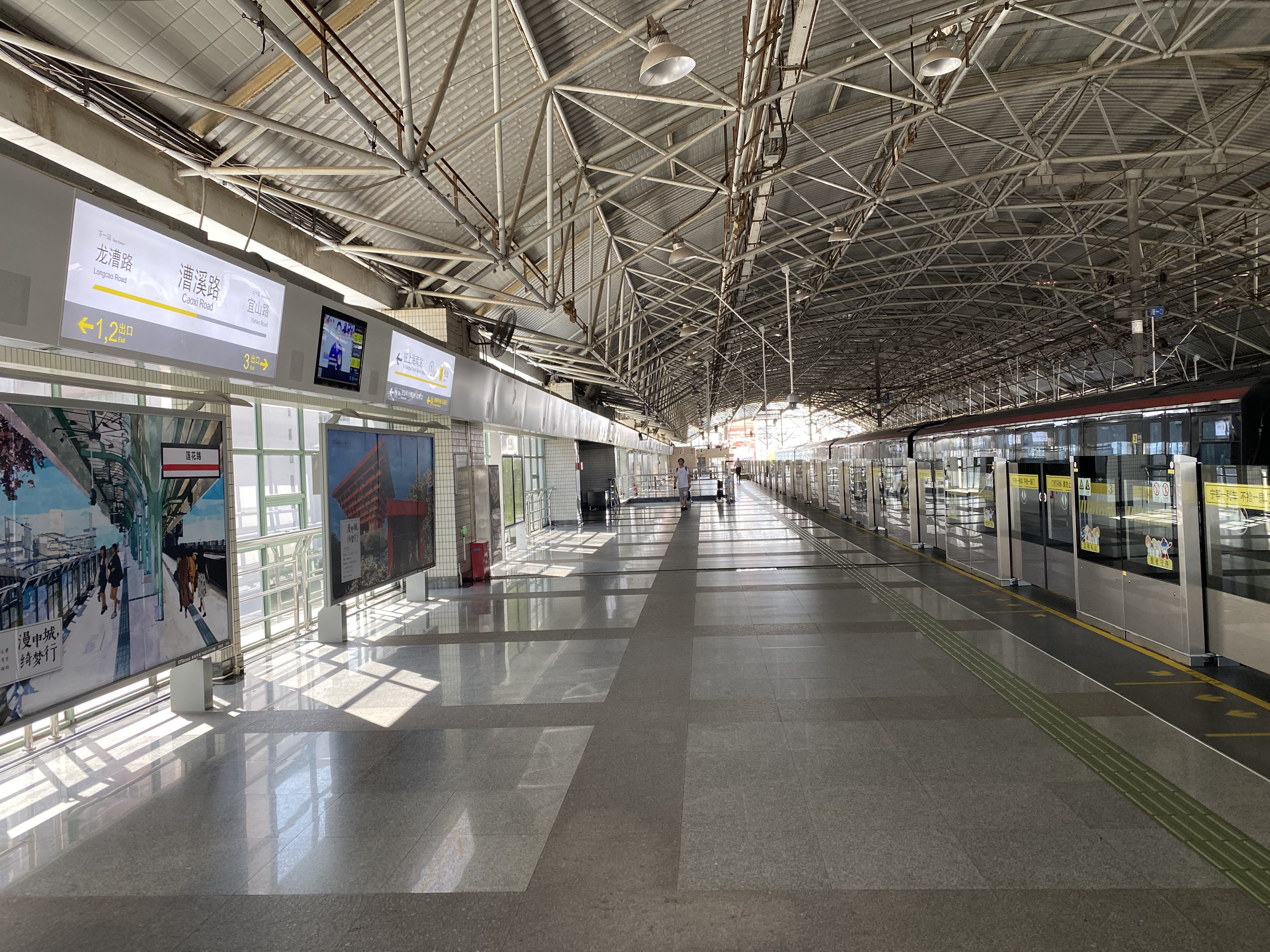
- Station platform in 2025

General information
- Location: Xuhui District, Shanghai; China
- Coordinates: 31°10′38″N 121°26′16″E
- Operator: Shanghai No. 3 Metro Operation Co. Ltd.
- Line: Line 3
- Platforms: 2 (2 side platforms)
- Tracks: 2

Construction
- Structure type: Elevated
- Accessible: Yes

History
- Opened: 26 December 2003

Services
Preceding station	Shanghai Metro	Following station
Yishan Road towards North Jiangyang Road	Line 3	Longcao Road towards Shanghai South Railway Station
Location
- Location within Shanghai

Caoxi Road (Chinese: 漕溪路; pinyin: Cáoxī Lù) is a station on Shanghai Metro Line 3. The station opened on 26 December 2000 as part of the initial section of Line 3 from Shanghai South Railway Station to Jiangwan Town. It is within walking distance of Shanghai's first IKEA store.

== Gallery ==
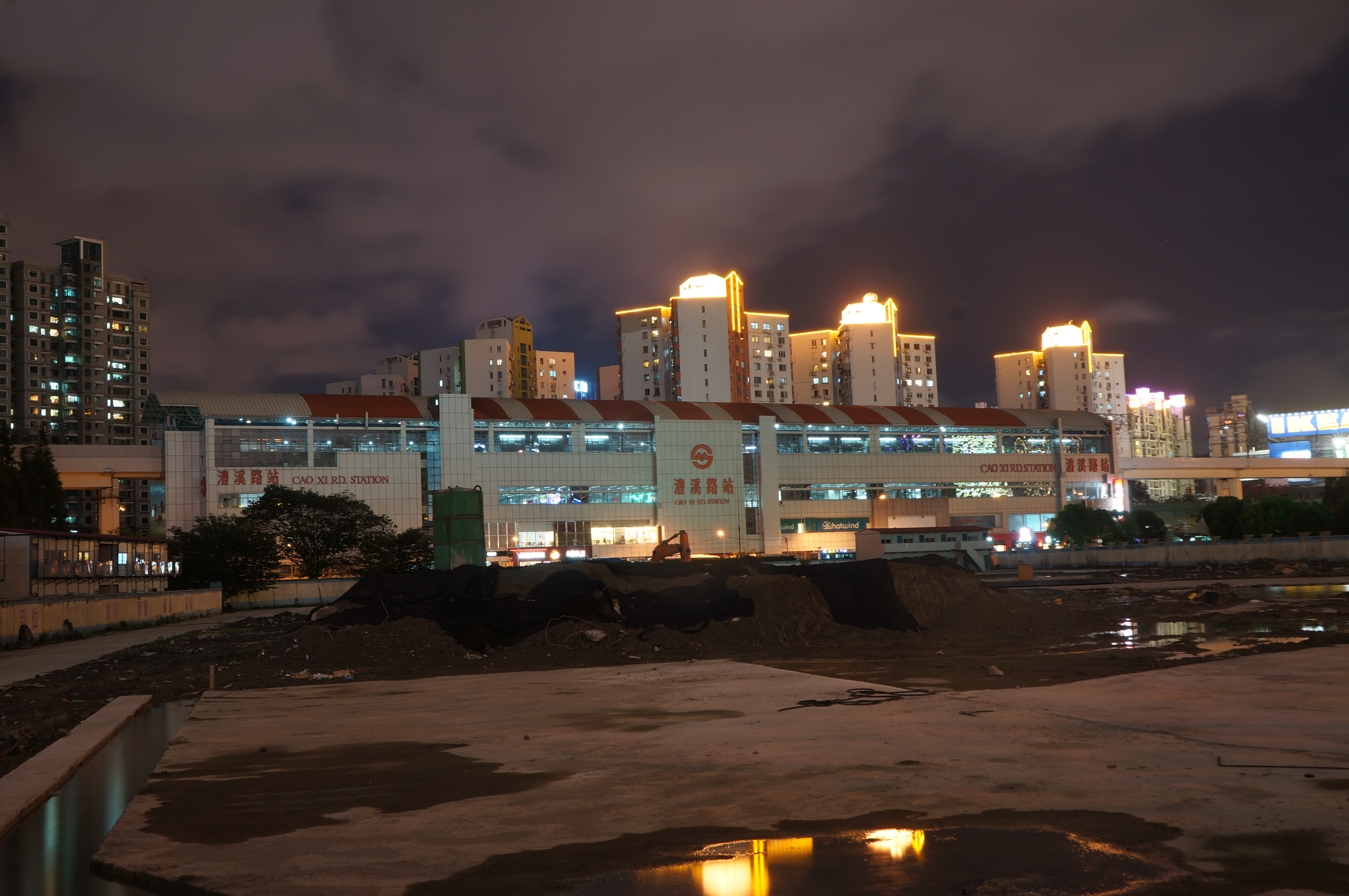
Station exterior (2016)

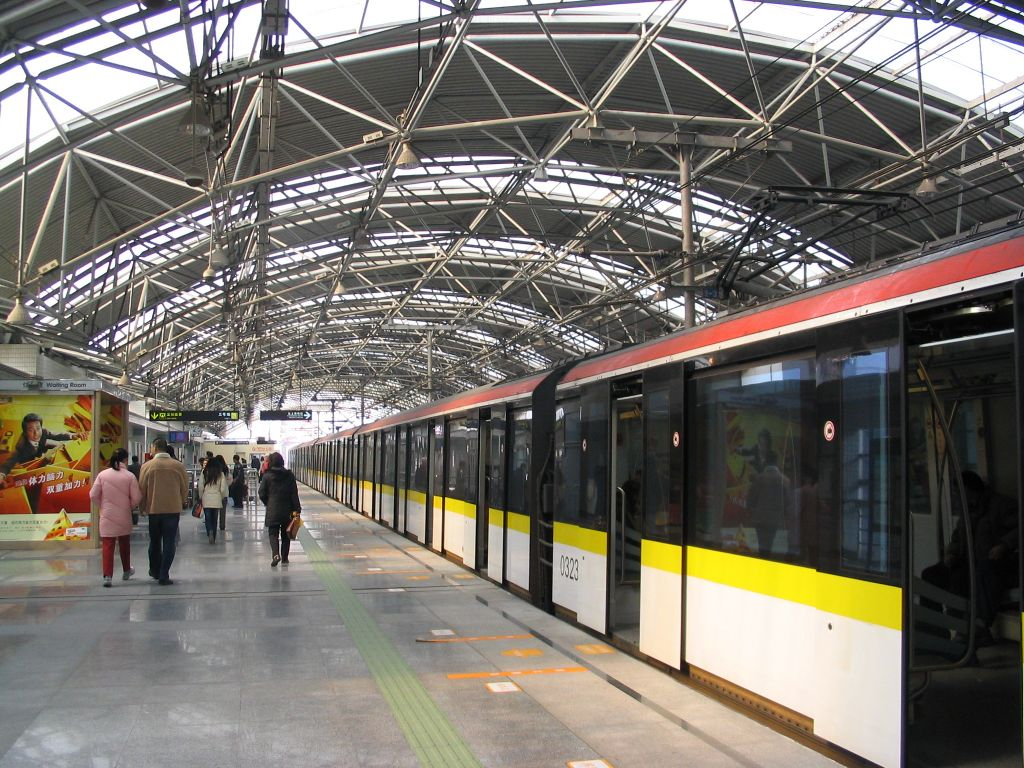
03A01 train at Caoxi Road station (2006)
