= Shanghai Indoor Stadium station =

Shanghai Metro interchange station

Shanghai Indoor Stadium 上海体育馆
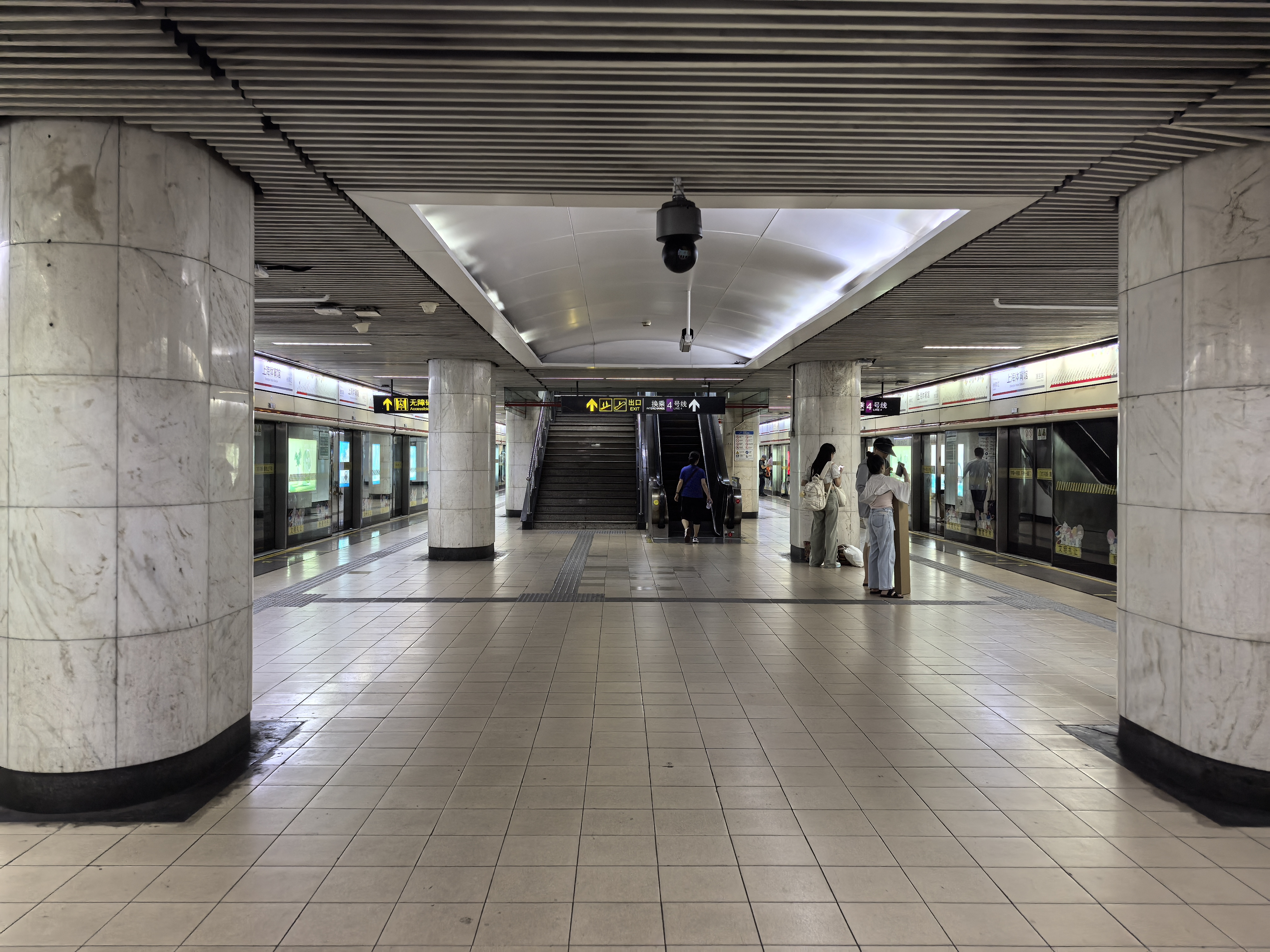
- Line 1 platform

General information
- Location: North Caoxi Road and Lingling Road (零陵路); Xuhui District, Shanghai; China
- Coordinates: 31°10′58″N 121°26′15″E
- Operator: Shanghai No. 1/3 Metro Operation Co. Ltd.
- Lines: Line 1; Line 4
- Platforms: 4 (2 island platforms)
- Tracks: 4

Construction
- Structure type: Underground
- Accessible: Yes

Other information
- Station code: L01/07 (Line 1/Fujin Line)

History
- Opened: 28 May 1993; 33 years ago (Line 1); 31 December 2005; 20 years ago (Line 4)

Services
Preceding station	Shanghai Metro	Following station
Xujiahui towards Fujin Road	Line 1	Caobao Road towards Xinzhuang
Yishan Road Clockwise	Line 4	Shanghai Stadium Counter-clockwise
Location
- Location within Shanghai

Shanghai Indoor Stadium (Chinese: 上海体育馆; pinyin: Shànghǎi Tǐyùguǎn) is an interchange station between lines 1 and 4 of the Shanghai Metro. This station is part of the initial southern section of the line that opened on 28 May 1993 and is located in Xuhui District; the interchange with Line 4 opened on 31 December 2005.

== Name ==
The Chinese name of this station (上海体育馆, literally Shanghai Sports Hall) refers to the nearby Shanghai Indoor Stadium. However, the station used to bear the English name Shanghai Stadium, referring to the adjacent outdoor stadium called Shanghai Stadium instead of the indoor stadium. After the opening of the nearby Shanghai Stadium Station (上海体育场站) specifically for the outdoor stadium, that station took the English name Shanghai Stadium, while this station was renamed Shanghai Indoor Stadium, now better reflecting the Chinese name.

== Station Layout ==
G	Entrances and Exits	Exits 1-8
B1	Line 1 Concourse	Faregates, Station Agent
B1	Line 4 Concourse	Faregates, Station Agent
B2	Northbound	← Line 1 towards Fujin Road (Xujiahui)
B2	Island platform, doors open on the left
B2	Southbound	Line 1 towards Xinzhuang (Caobao Road) →
B3	Clockwise	← Line 4 to Yishan Road
B3	Island platform, doors open on the left
B3	Counterclockwise	Line 4 to Shanghai Stadium →

== Nearby locations ==
- Shanghai Indoor Stadium
- Shanghai Stadium
- Sightseeing bus station, with shuttle buses to Sheshan Forest Park and other destinations

== Accidents ==
In 2007, a man tried to board a crowded train but was unable to. He died when the automatic glass sliding doors closed in on him and he was dragged underneath the train.
