= Shanghai Stadium station =

Shanghai Metro station

Shanghai Stadium 上海体育场
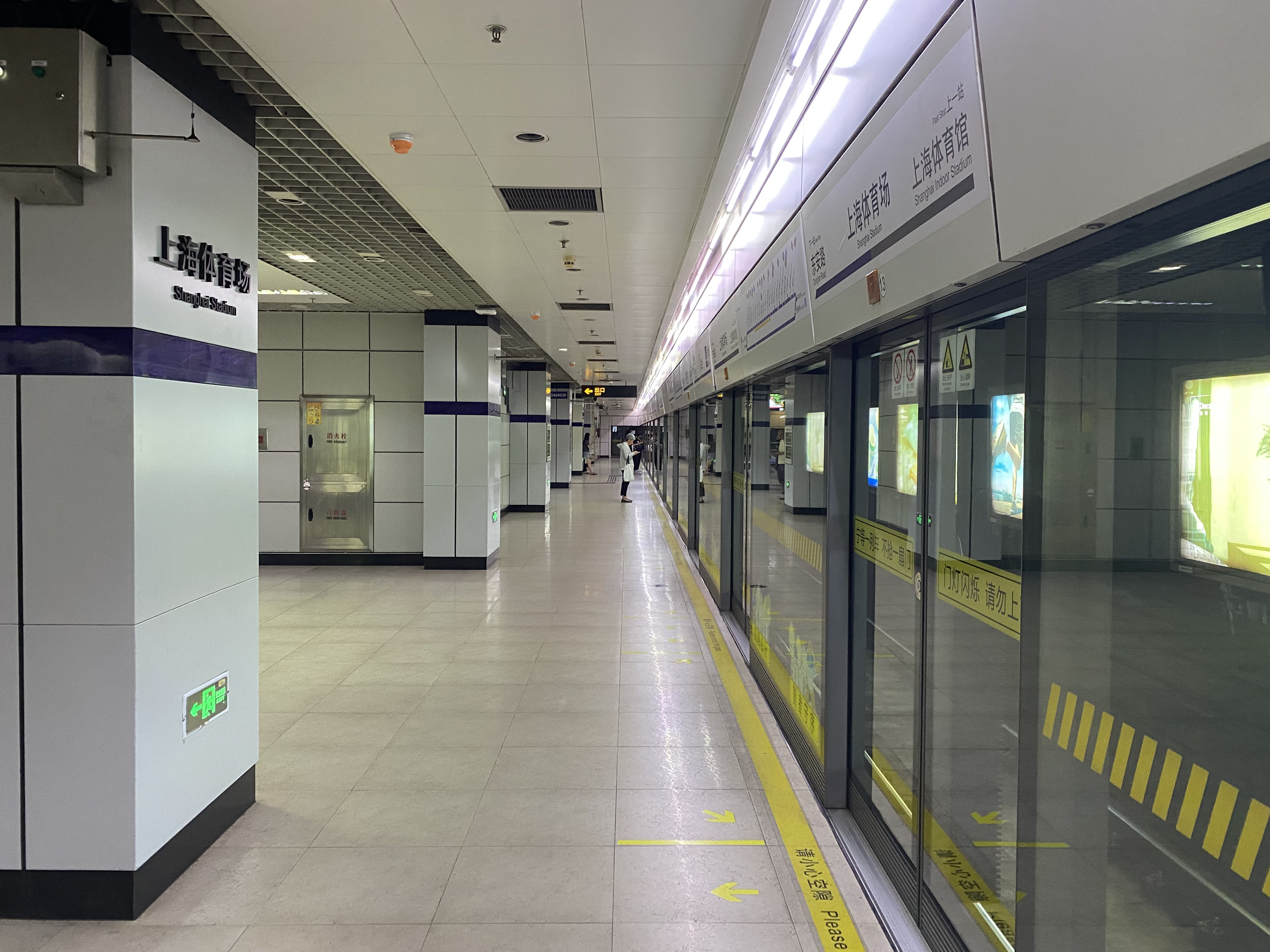
- Station platform

General information
- Location: Lingling Road (零陵路) and Tianyaoqiao Road (天钥桥路); Xuhui District, Shanghai; China
- Coordinates: 31°11′08″N 121°26′37″E
- Operator: Shanghai No. 3 Metro Operation Co. Ltd.
- Line: Line 4
- Platforms: 2 (1 island platform)
- Tracks: 2

Construction
- Structure type: Underground
- Accessible: Yes

History
- Opened: 31 December 2005; 20 years ago

Services
Preceding station	Shanghai Metro	Following station
Shanghai Indoor Stadium Clockwise	Line 4	Dong'an Road Counter-clockwise
Location
- Location within Shanghai

Shanghai Stadium (simplified Chinese: 上海体育场; traditional Chinese: 上海體育場; pinyin: Shànghǎi Tǐyùchǎng) is a station on Line 4 of the Shanghai Metro. Service began at this station on 31 December 2005.

== Name ==
The name of the station "上海体育场" (literally Shanghai Sports Field) refers to nearby Shanghai Stadium. As the adjacent Line 1/Line 4 transfer station previously used this English name, that station is now translated as Shanghai Indoor Stadium. Still, confusion remains due to the similarity of the names in both English and Chinese, only differing by one word/character, and referring to facilities located in close vicinity.

== Nearby locations ==
- Shanghai Stadium
- Shanghai Indoor Stadium
- Sightseeing bus station, with shuttle buses to Sheshan Forest Park and other destinations
- Longhua Hospital
- Shanghai Mental Health Center
