= Xujiahui Park =

Park in Shanghai, China

Coordinates: 31°11′57″N 121°26′17″E

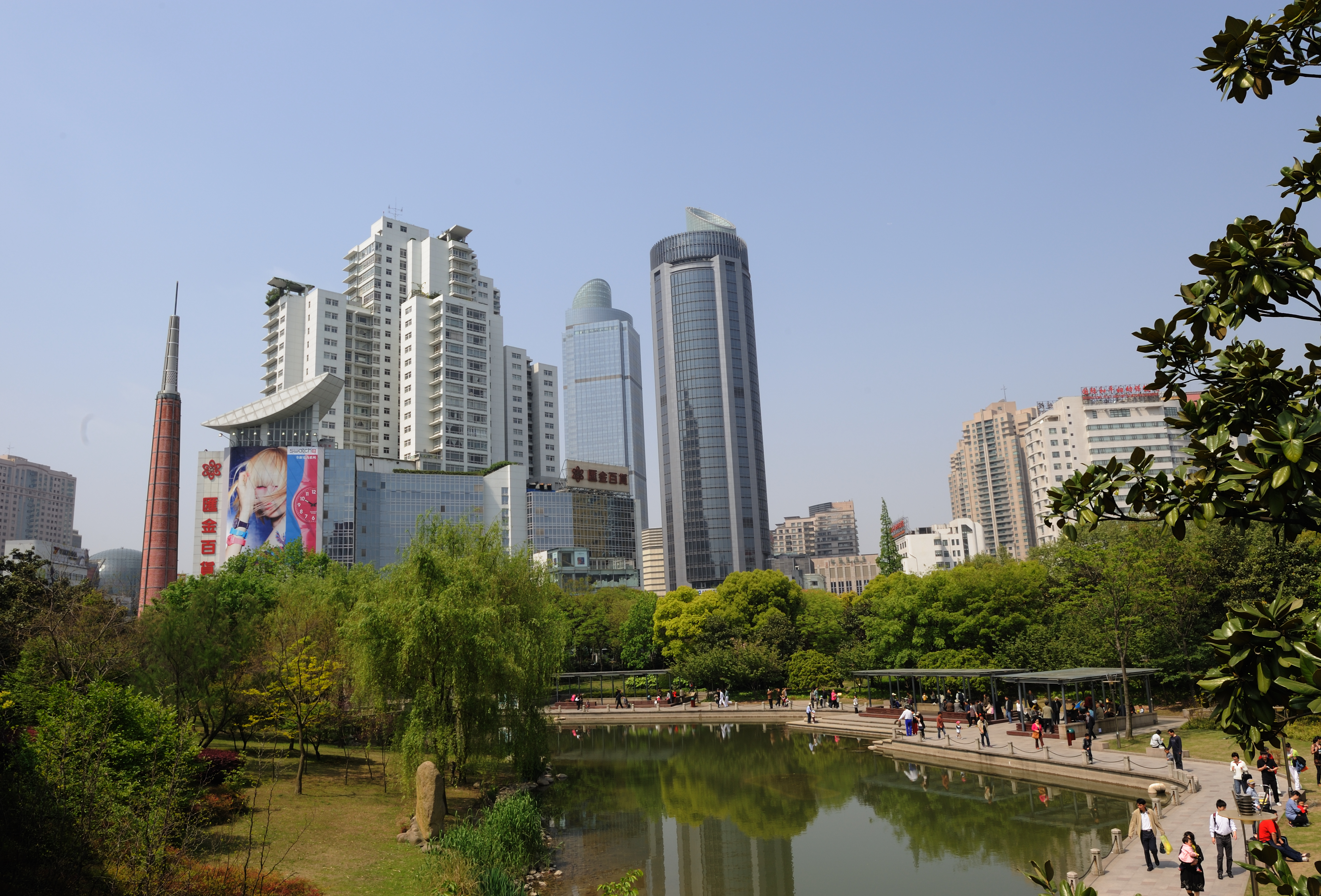
- Interactive map of Xujiahui Park
- Location: Shanghai

Xujiahui Park
- Simplified Chinese: 徐家汇公园
- Traditional Chinese: 徐家彙公園
Transcriptions
Standard Mandarin
- Hanyu Pinyin: Xújiāhuì Gōngyuán

Xujiahui Park is a park in Xuhui District, Shanghai. It was built in 1999, on the former grounds of the Great Chinese Rubber Works Factory and the EMI Recording Studio (now La Villa Rouge restaurant). The park has an artificial lake with a sky bridge running across the park.

The layout of the paths, bridges and pond in the park roughly depict the layout of nearby Shanghai streets and the Pu river. In this way, the park is somewhat recursive as the paths at the south-west entrance of the park match the streets near the south-west entrance of the park.
