= Shanghai Guangming High School =

High school in Shanghai, China

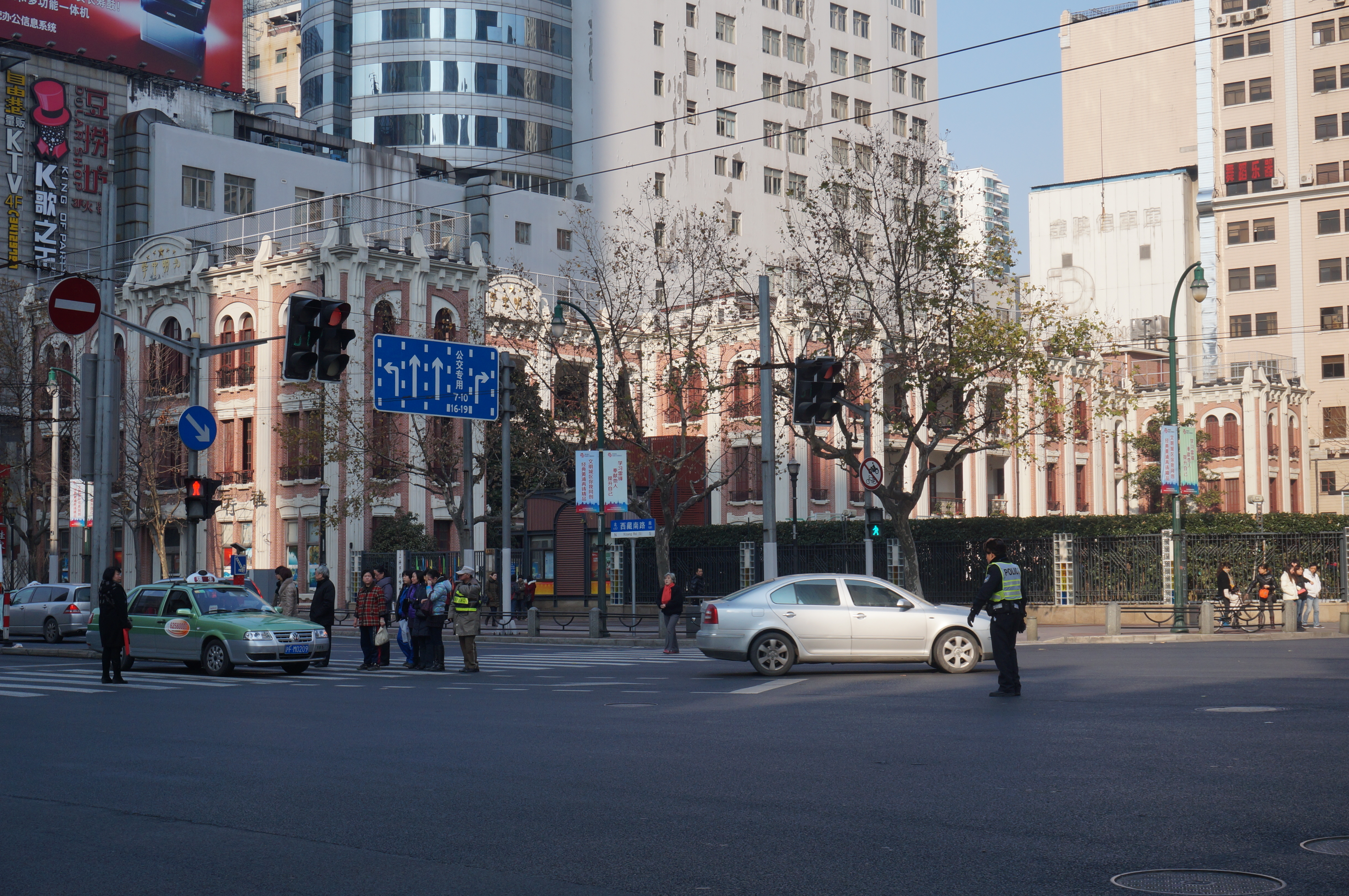
- 181, South Xizang Road, Shanghai, China

Information
- Established: 1886
- School district: Huangpu District, Shanghai, China
- Principal: Mu Xiaojiong
- Website: gm.hpe.cn

Shanghai Guangming High School is a school on Xizangnan Road in the Huangpu District and the city centre of Shanghai, China. Founded by the French in 1886, it has been notable for over a century.

Until 1946, when French forces left Shanghai, the school was known as the Sino-French Municipal School (Ecole municipale Sino-française), then as the Sino-French School (Ecole Sino-française), and took its present name in 1951. It was designated as a "demonstrative high school" in 2005.

== History ==
The school was founded on its present site, then part of the former Luwan district, by the Municipal Council of the Shanghai French Concession, with places for one hundred students, who were taught only in French. In the evenings, there was also a class to teach French to officers serving in the French Concession. There were no school fees, and books were also paid for by the Municipal Council. In 1911, the school adopted the French school system, with four teaching levels: early childhood education, followed by primary school (école primaire), then middle school (collège), and finally high school (lycée). In the primary and middle schools, children were taught in French and Chinese for three hours each. In the high school, teaching was in French for five hours a day, and for one hour in Chinese.

After the May Fourth Movement rose up in 1919, some students from this school and others, including the Zhen Dan College and the Xu Jia Hui Catholic School, took part in three-phase anti-imperialist strikes – walkouts from workplaces, schools, and markets.

By the Sino-French Accord of February 1946, signed by Chiang Kai-shek's Kuomintang (a party which had originated in the Shanghai French Concession), Chinese troops pulled out of the northern half of French Indochina, in exchange for France giving up all of its territorial concessions in China, and the French forces left Shanghai. In the same year the school was taken over and renamed by the new local authority.

The school is one of three in Shanghai to establish experimental bilingual classes taught in both French and Chinese, with native French-speaking teachers. It has visits and exchanges with high schools in France, Canada, the United States, Japan, Korea, Singapore, Taiwan, and Hong Kong. In 2017, it gained the French "LabelFrancÉducation" status, becoming the first school in China to be so accredited, and as of 2018 one of only 205 such schools worldwide.

On 19 April 2018, President Emmanuel Macron mentioned the school in a speech on the Francophonie:

Even outside our institutions, French-speaking bilingual programs are in high demand overseas, from the Lafayette Academy in New York to the Guangming High School in Shanghai and the 18th High School in Zagreb.

== Buildings ==
In 1913, a three-story school building on Xizangnan Street was built in the shape of the Roman numerals "II". In 1923, a three-story building in the shape of a radical 46 (山), in a mixture of the Art Nouveau and Romanesque styles, was added on its east side, and this is now the Guangming Middle School. A large playground, enclosed within walls, has enough space for a small football ground, and with an athletics track around it. The three-story building still stands and has a floor area of 6,725 square metres. There is also a new teaching centre building, equipped with modern science laboratories and a gym, which was opened by the Chinese mathematician Su Buqing.
