= Shanghai Science Hall =

Building in Shanghai, China

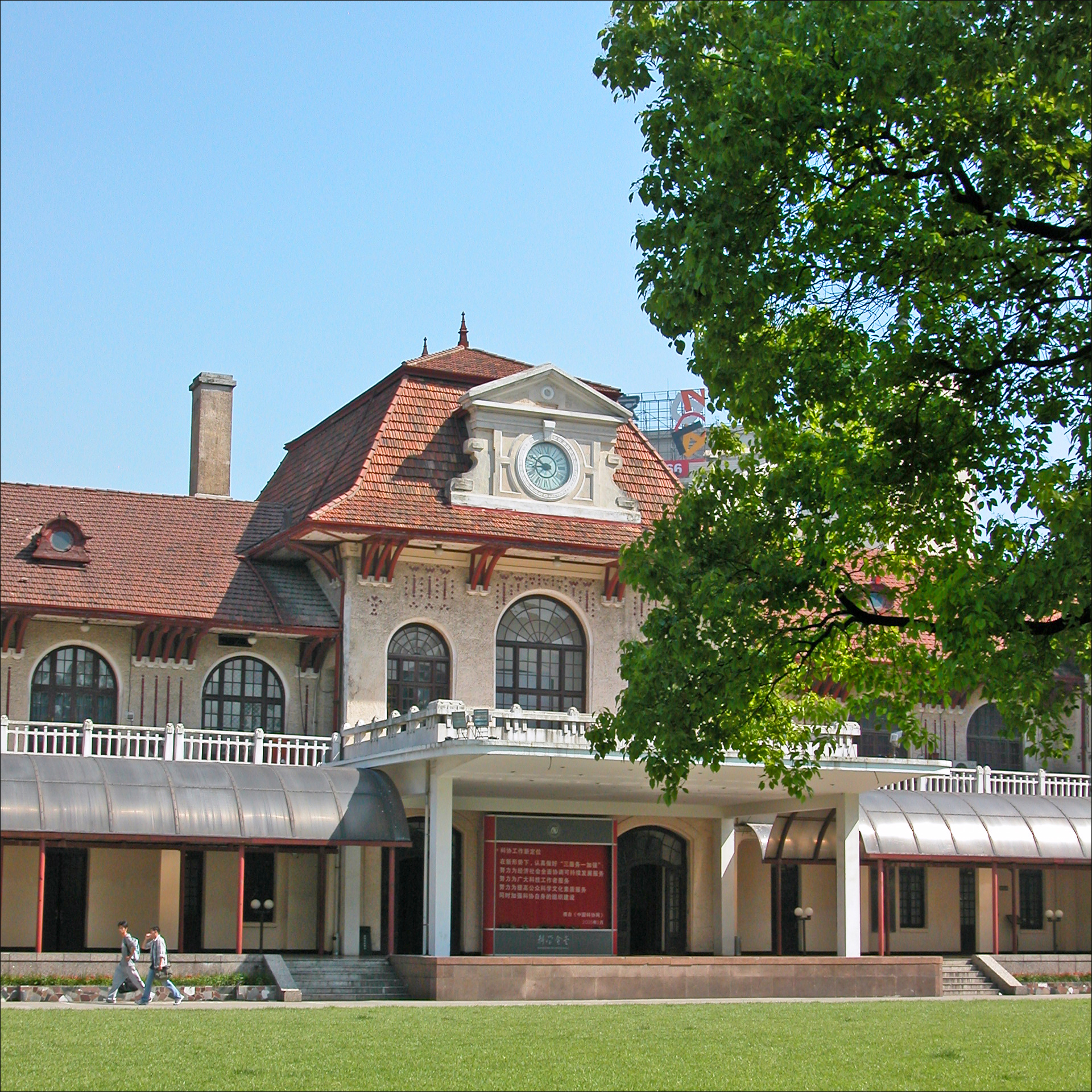
- Facade of the Shanghai Science Hall from the garden
- Interactive map of the Shanghai Science Hall area

General information
- Architectural style: French classical
- Location: 47 Nanchang Road, Luwan District, Shanghai, China 200020
- Coordinates: 31.21900°N 121.46863°E
- Year built: 1917
- Owner: Shanghai Association for Science and Technology

Technical details
- Material: Concrete and wood
- Floor count: 2

Website
- sciencehall.org

The Shanghai Science Hall (Chinese: 科學會堂) is a building in the Luwan District of central Shanghai, China, within the French Concession area.

== History ==
The original building of the Science Hall is both Chinese and Western in style. The main building is located at No. 47 Nanchang Road. Built in 1917 during the Art Deco period, it is a French classical two-storey building with a concrete and wooden frame structure. It was initially used by the French community in Shanghai, including as a school, an orphanage, and a sports club.

== Shanghai Association for Science and Technology ==
The Science Hall is now a public institution for people from the field of science and technology under the Shanghai Association for Science and Technology (SAST) and was established in this role on 18 January 1958. An inscription of "Science Hall" was carved above the front gate.

== Facilities ==
The Sinan Building of the Science Hall is at No. 59 Nanchang Road on the west side and was completed in 2001. It is 16 stories high with a total construction area of 17,800 m^{2}. The Science Hall at No. 57 Nanchang Road is also connected.

There is a garden of 6,000 m^{2} in the courtyard of the main building, lined with trees. The original building is one of the earliest "Excellent Historic Buildings" to receive a nameplate in Shanghai due to its architectural importance.

The Science Hall now has several buildings, including a very modern highrise building, which allows the accommodation of students and researchers, the organization of scientific conferences, seminars, training, exhibitions, and various meetings on scientific and technical subjects. It can also be visited as a tourist and has a restaurant.

== See also ==
- List of historic buildings in Shanghai
- Shanghai Science and Technology Museum

== Gallery ==
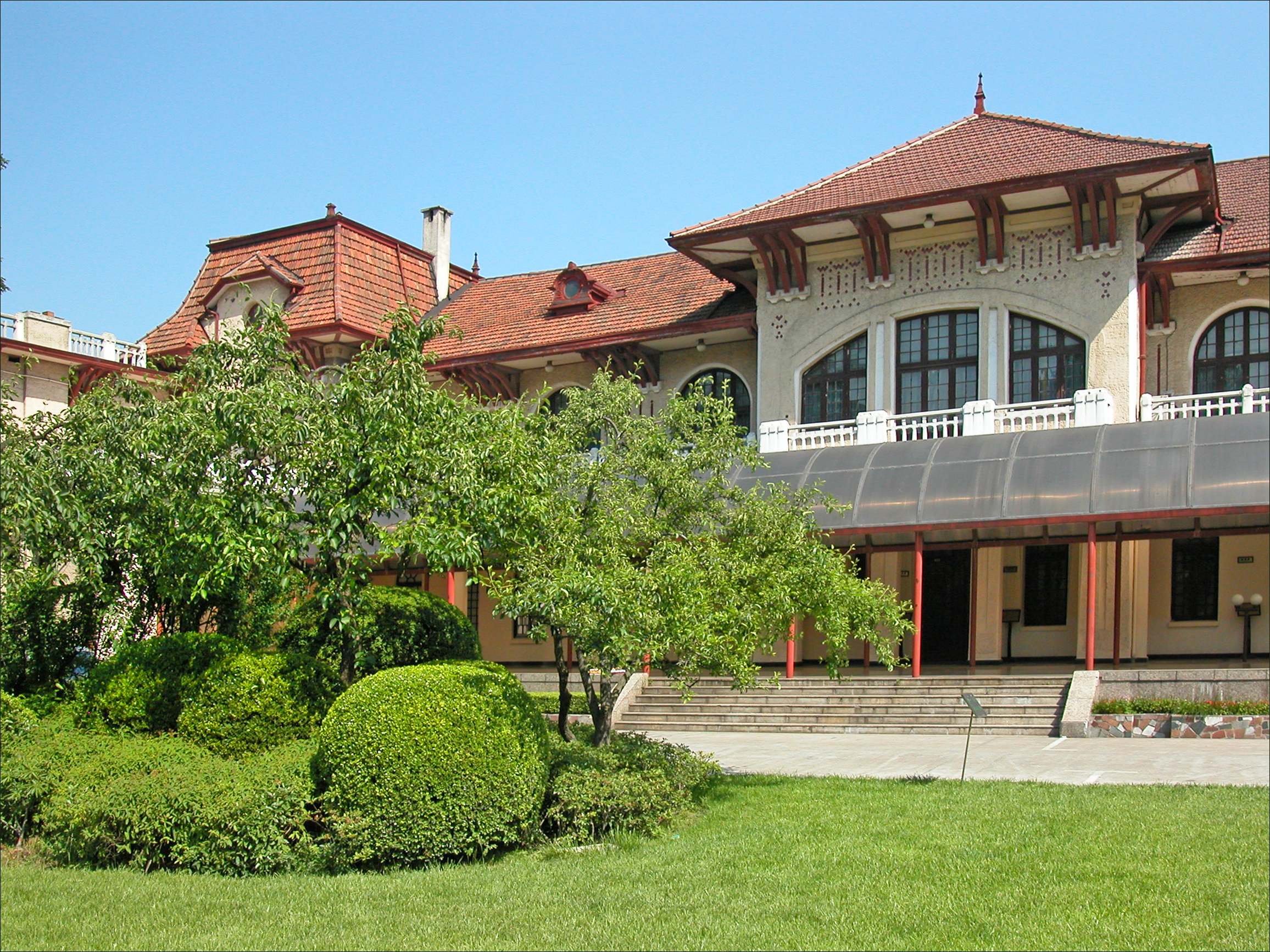
Alternative exterior view of the building

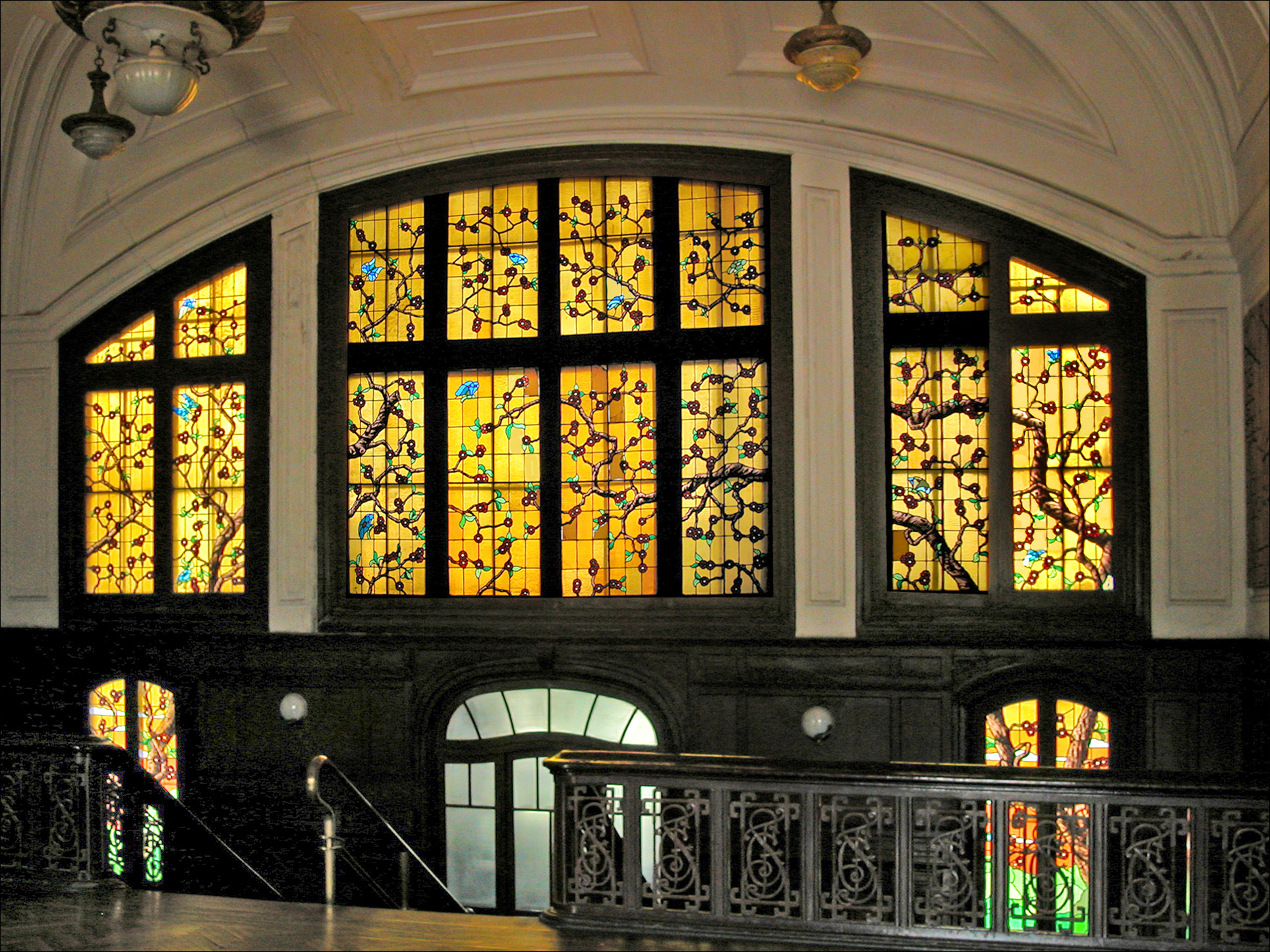
Interior view in the Shanghai Science Hall
