= Hengshan Road =

Street in Shanghai, China

Coordinates: 31°12′06″N 121°26′39″E

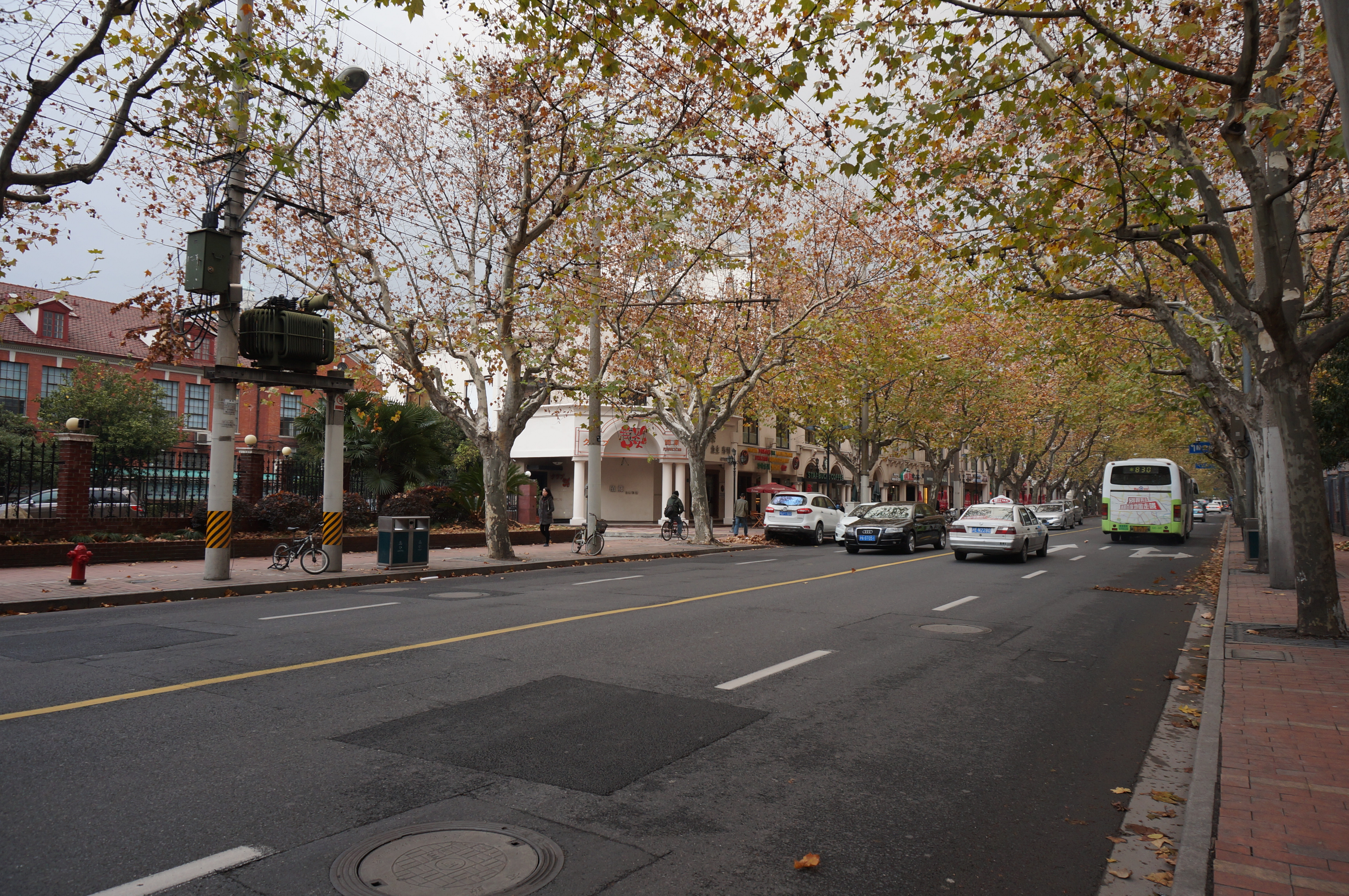
Hengshan Road

Hengshan Road (Chinese: 衡山路; pinyin: Héngshān Lù), formerly Avenue Pétain, is a street in the former French Concession of Shanghai, China. A major thoroughfare that connected the heart of the French Concession with the Catholic district of Zikawei (Xujiahui), the boulevard was for much of the 20th century the centre of Shanghai's premier residential district. Since the 1990s, many of the mansions along the road have been converted into bars, night clubs, and restaurants. From 2016 onward, many of the bars on Hengshan Road have been closed down or moved away to other new and more popular entertainment districts in the city.

== History ==
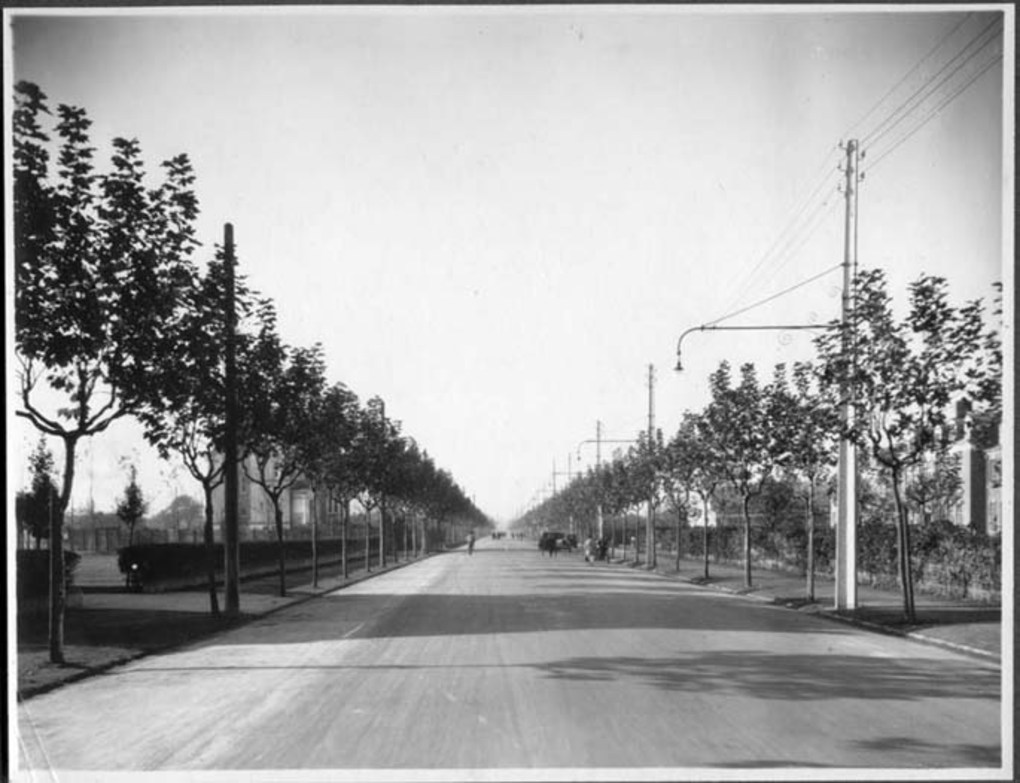
Avenue Pétain in the 1920s

Named after Philippe Pétain, Marshal of France, the boulevarde was constructed in 1922 to link the heart of the French Concession with Zikawei, now Xujiahui, the centre of Catholicism in Shanghai. It stretched from Rue Pottier and Rue Henri-Rivière in the east, to the intersection of Avenue Haig and Rue de Zikawei in the west.

The newly developed boulevard soon attracted an American presence, as American expatriates who worked in the Shanghai International Settlement built more spacious residences in the newly developed area. This American presence can still be seen in the form of the former American College (No. 10), and the Community Church (No. 53). A large number of mansions were built along the road in the 1920s, with some high-end apartment blocks built in the 1930s as land value soared in the area. The Chinese headquarters of Pathé Records was also located on Avenue Petain.

The French Concession was handed over by Vichy France to the Wang Jingwei government in 1943, which renamed the boulevard as "Hengshan Road", after Mount Heng, a sacred mountain in Hunan province.

In the 1990s, many of the former mansions were converted into bars, night clubs and restaurants, making the street an important centre of night entertainment in Shanghai. Many of the restaurants and bars are located in side streets off Hengshan Road, particularly, Dongping Road and Taojiang Road.

The Community Church, also known as the International church or Union Church, was built in 1925 (at the corner of Wulumuqi (Ürümqi) Road) is open to foreigners and has services on Sundays.

Just off Hengshan Road near the Hengshan Road Metro station, on Gao'an Road, are some of the few remaining manhole entrances mark "CMF" (Conseil Municipal Français). The man hole covers have been replaced, but the metal structures around the outside are original.

== Present day ==
There are numerous bars, nightclubs and a bowling alley located towards the center of the street. Next to the subway station is Yong Ping Li, an ANKEN urban regeneration project consisting of a 6,000 sqm compound stretching from Heng Shan Rd through to Yonjia Rd

== Transportation ==
The central part of Hengshan Road can be reached by taking Shanghai Metro Line 1 to Hengshan Road station. It is also a short ride by taxi from central Shanghai.
