= Hengshan Road station =

Shanghai Metro station

Hengshan Road 衡山路
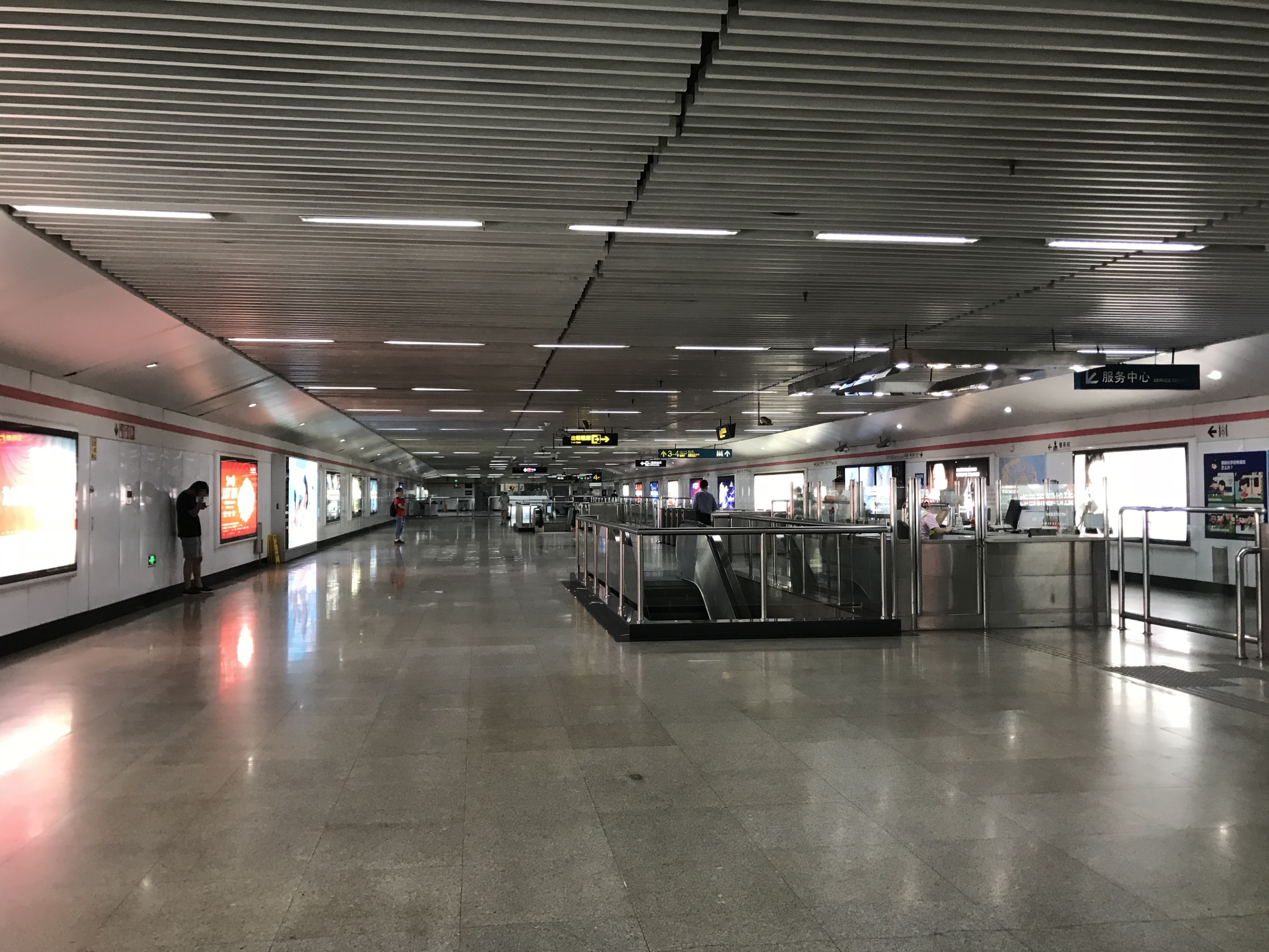
- Station concourse

General information
- Location: Hengshan Road and Gao'an Road; Xuhui District, Shanghai; China
- Coordinates: 31°12′17″N 121°26′47″E
- Operator: Shanghai No. 1 Metro Operation Co. Ltd.
- Line: Line 1
- Platforms: 2 (1 island platform)
- Tracks: 2

Construction
- Structure type: Underground
- Accessible: Yes

Other information
- Station code: L01/09

History
- Opened: 10 April 1995

Services
Preceding station	Shanghai Metro	Following station
Changshu Road towards Fujin Road	Line 1	Xujiahui towards Xinzhuang
Location
- Location within Shanghai

Hengshan Road (Chinese: 衡山路; pinyin: Héngshān Lù) is a station on Line 1 of the Shanghai Metro, located along Hengshan Road in Xuhui District. It opened on 10 April 1995 as part of the section between Jinjiang Park and Shanghai Railway Station.

== Places nearby ==
- Hengshan Road nightlife district
