= Ambelie Gallery =

Private gallery in Shanghai, China

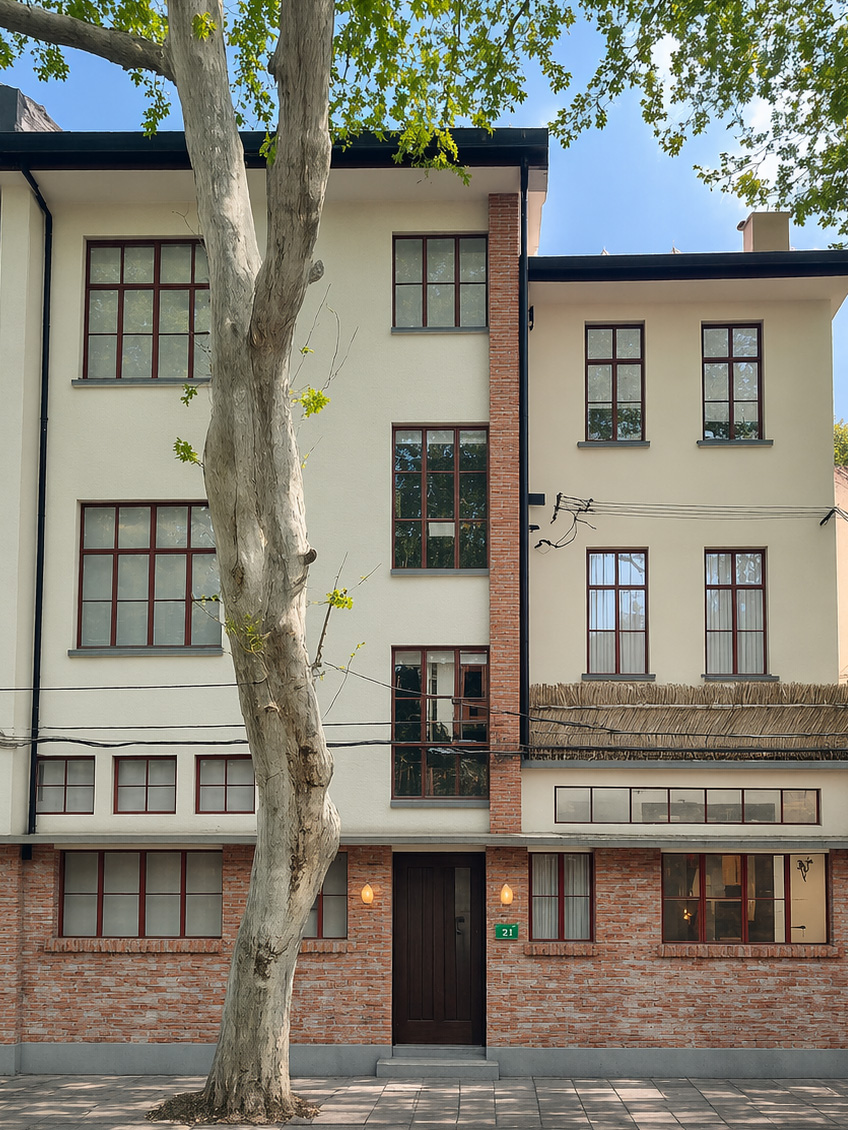
- Shanghai branch

- Location within Shanghai
- Location: No. 21 Kangping Road, Xuhui District, Shanghai, China
- Coordinates: 31.2043°N 121.4438°E
- Type: Private gallery
- Collections: oriental arts, antique furniture, mid-century modern design, decorative arts, fashion
- Founder: Amber Lyu
- Website: www.ambelie.com

Ambelie Gallery is a privately operated gallery and retail design space based in Shanghai, China, with a second location in Hangzhou.

The Shanghai location is at No. 21 Kangping Road in the Xuhui District. The gallery occupies a three-storey building was constructed in 1945, originally situated in the former French Concession. A second location operates in Hangzhou, Zhejiang.

== Collections ==
The gallery focuses on oriental arts, antique furniture, and contemporary design, as well as decorative arts and fashion collectibles.

It maintains an inventory of Asian antique furniture sourced from international markets alongside contemporary design objects.

== Exhibitions ==
The gallery has hosted thematic exhibitions, including one centred on antique oriental coromandel screens and works of eastern classical calligraphy mounted in brocade from the Ming and Qing dynasties presented under the title Yunqi Kaisui.

== See also ==
- Shanghai French Concession
- Mid-century modern
