= Luwan, Shanghai =

Former district of Shanghai, China

Luwan District, Shanghai Municipality 上海市卢湾区
- District of China
- 1945–2011
- Location of Luwan District in Shanghai Municipality
- Area
  - Coordinates: 31°07′N 121°28′E
- History
  - Established: 1945
  - Disestablished: 2011
Succeeded by
Huangpu District, Shanghai
- Today part of: Huangpu District, Shanghai

Luwan, Shanghai
- Traditional Chinese: 盧灣區
- Simplified Chinese: 卢湾区
- Wugniu: lu^{2} uae^{1} chiu^{1}
- Postal: Lokawei
Transcriptions
Standard Mandarin
- Hanyu Pinyin: Lúwān Qū
Wu
- Wugniu: lu^{2} uae^{1} chiu^{1}
Yue: Cantonese
- Jyutping: lou^{4} waan^{1} keoi^{1}

Lujiawan
- Traditional Chinese: 盧家灣
- Simplified Chinese: 卢家湾
- Wugniu: lu^{2} ka^{1} uae^{1}
Transcriptions
Standard Mandarin
- Hanyu Pinyin: Lújiāwān
Wu
- Wugniu: lu^{2} ka^{1} uae^{1}
Yue: Cantonese
- Jyutping: lou^{4} gaa^{1} waan^{1}

Luwan District (formerly romanized as Lokawei) was a district located in central Shanghai, until its merger with Huangpu District in June 2011. It had an area of 8.05 km^{2} (3.11 sq mi) and population of 350,000 as of 2001.

== Location ==
Luwan district was located directly south of People's Square. The northern part of Luwan included one of the best sections of Huaihai Road, famous for its international fashion shops and high-class restaurants.

== History ==
Luwan was a part of the old French Concession area, one of the most prestigious sections of the city. It was famous for its boulevards. The plane trees lining the main streets were imported from France over 100 years ago. The district included the historical residences of Sun Yat-sen, Mao Zedong, Zhou Enlai, Agnes Smedley and Mei Lanfang, among others. It was announced on June 8, 2011, that the proposed plan of merging Luwan and Huangpu districts had been approved by the State Council. Since the new district would still maintain the name Huangpu, Luwan as a district ceased to exist.

The present-day Shanghai Guangming High School in South Xizang Road was founded in 1886 as the "Sino-French Municipal School".

== Name origin ==
The district was named after Lujiawan (lit. 'Lu Family's Bay'), formerly a bend in a local river which had since been covered up. The name survived in bus stops located near the former location of the bay. Known as Lukawei during the French Concession period, this was the location of the main police depot and prison of the French Concession.

== See also ==
- Huangpu District, Shanghai
- Shanghai French Concession
  - Xuhui District
- Shanghai Science Hall
- Lupu Bridge
- Lippo Plaza, Shanghai
