= Lippo Plaza =

Coordinates: 31.226294°N 121.470992°E

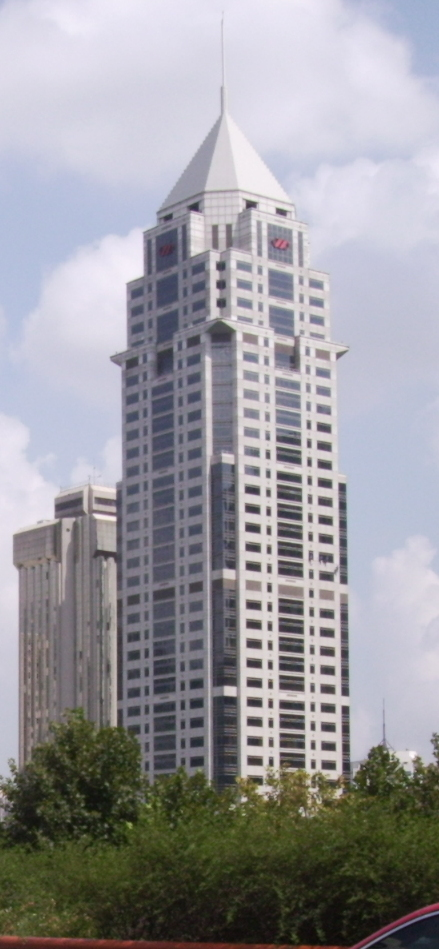
- Lippo Plaza in 2008

- Location within Shanghai

General information
- Type: Office & Retail
- Location: No.222 Huai Hai Road Middle, Luwan District, Shanghai, China
- Completed: 1998

Height
- Antenna spire: 655 feet (200 m)
- Roof: 585 feet (178 m)

Technical details
- Floor count: 40
- Floor area: 62,000 m²

Design and construction
- Architects: Frank C Y Feng Design Architect = Kevin Vatche Aslanian, New York, USA Design Principal = Mike Suzuki, New York, USA

Lippo Plaza is a 38-floor tower in the Luwan District of Shanghai, China and was completed in 1998. It was built by architect Frank C Y Feng and Associates Limited.

== See also ==
- List of tallest buildings in Shanghai
