= French concession of Shanghai =

Foreign concession in China (1849–1943)

Shanghai French Concession Concession française de Changhaï 上海法租界
- Foreign concession of France
- 1849–1943
- Flag Seal

- \
- Population
  - 1932: 478,552
- History
  - Established: 1849
  - Disestablished: 1943
Preceded by	Succeeded by
Shanghai County	Shanghai Special Municipality
- Today part of: Huangpu District and Xuhui District, Shanghai Municipality

The Shanghai French Concession (Note: French: Concession française de Changhaï; Chinese: 上海法租界; pinyin: Shànghǎi Fǎ Zūjiè; Shanghainese pronunciation: Zånhae Fah Tsuka) was a foreign concession in Shanghai, China, from 1849 until 1943. For much of the 20th century, the area covered by the former French Concession remained the premier residential and retail district of Shanghai. It was also one of the centers of Catholicism in China. Despite re-development over the last few decades, the area retains a distinct character and is a popular tourist destination.

== History ==
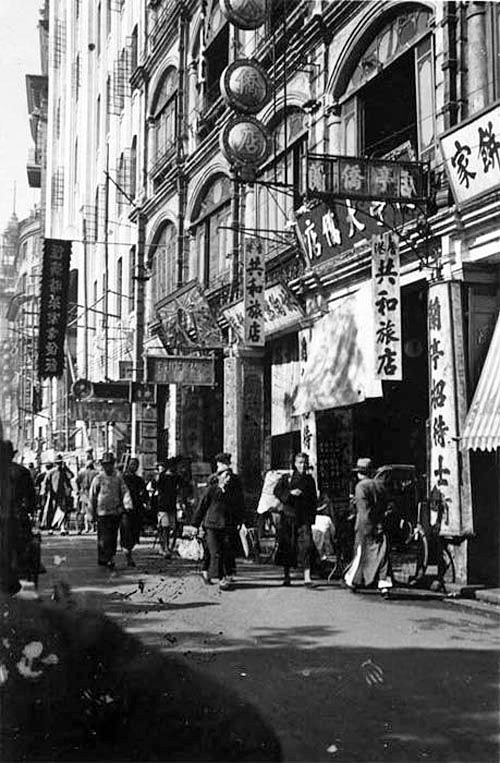
Rue du Consulat (East Jinling Road), the rue principale or "high street" of the original French Concession, pictured in the 1930s.

=== Establishment ===
After the British victory in the First Opium War, foreign powers, including France, obtained concessions in China through the unequal treaties.

The French Concession was established on 6 April 1849. The French consul in Shanghai, Charles de Montigny, obtained a proclamation from Lin Kouei (麟桂, Lin Gui), the circuit intendant (tao-tai/daotai, effectively governor) of Shanghai, which conceded certain territory for a French settlement.

The extent of the French Concession at the time of establishment extended south to the Old City's moat, north to the Yangjingbang canal (Yang-king-pang, now Yan'an Road), west to the Temple of Guan Yu (Koan-ti-miao, 关帝庙) and the Zhujia Bridge (Tchou-kia-kiao, 褚家桥), and east to the banks of the Huangpu River between the Guangdong-Chaozhou Union (Koang'tong-Tchao-tcheou kong-hoan) and the mouth of the Yangjingbang canal.

The French Concession effectively occupied a narrow "collar" of land around the northern end of the Old City, south of the British settlement. At an area of 66 hectares (986 mu), the French Concession was about a third of the size of the British settlement at that time.

=== Development ===
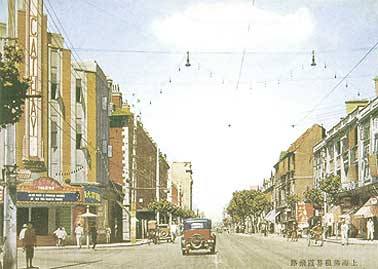
Avenue Joffre in the 1930s: one of the major commercial streets in the French Concession

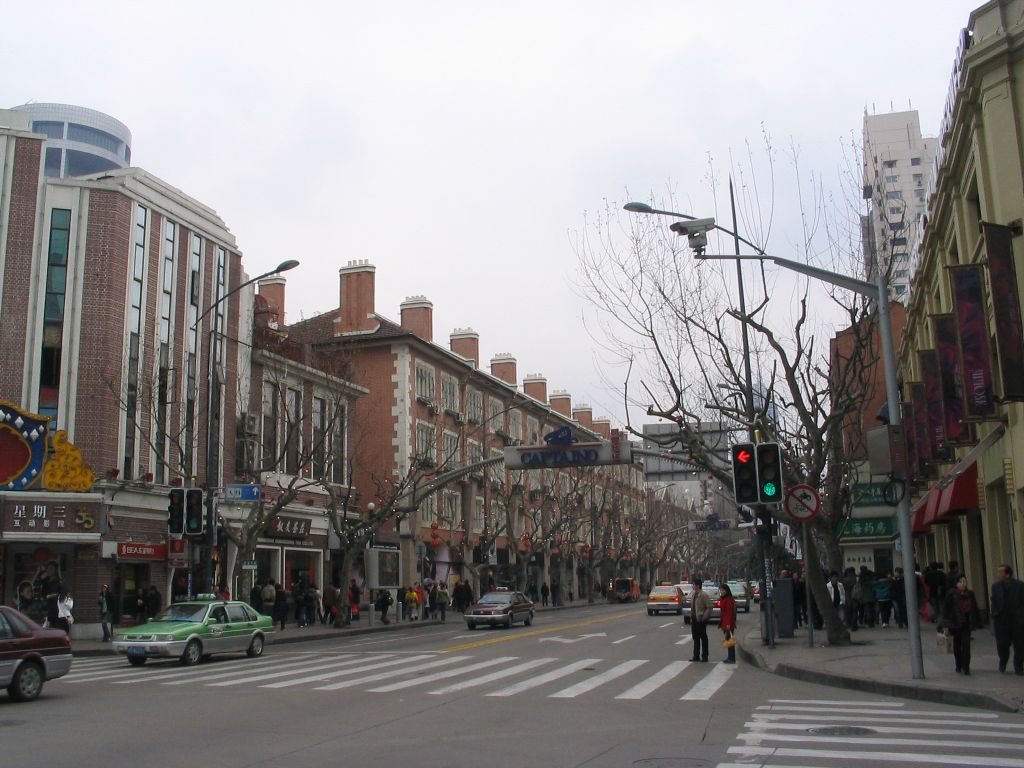
The same location (now Huaihai Road) in 2007: many street front buildings have been preserved, and highrises also line the street

A small strip of riverside land to the east of the Old City was added in 1861, to allow the construction of the quai de France, which would service shipping between China and France. A further expansion, agreed to in 1899 and proclaimed in 1900, allowed the French Concession to double in size. The area newly added to the concession sat immediately to the west of the original grant.

Meanwhile, from the 1860s, the French Concession authorities (like the other concession authorities) had begun constructing "extra-settlement roads" outside the concession. The first such road was built to connect the west gate of the Old City to the Catholic stronghold at Zi-ka-wei (Xujiahui), to allow French troops to quickly move between the concession and the Catholic Church land located in the area. Controlled by concession authorities, extra-settlement roads effectively gave France and the other treaty powers a form of control over land extending outside their formal concessions.

In 1913, France requested police powers over its extra-settlement roads, effectively meaning a further expansion to the concession. The government of Yuan Shikai agreed, giving France police and taxation powers over the so-called extra-settlement roads area, in return for France agreeing to evict revolutionaries from the area under its jurisdiction. This agreement proclaimed in 1914, gave the French Concession control over a significantly larger area between the Old City and Xujiahui, 15 times the size of the original grant. As a nod to the more numerous Chinese residents in the new territory, two seats were given to Chinese members on the Administration Council. Encouraged by the successful expansion by the French, the Shanghai International Settlement also requested the grant of administrative powers over its own extra-settlement roads area in 1914, but this was refused.

In 1902, the French introduced from France London planes (le platane commun) as a roadside tree on Avenue Joffre (present-day Huaihai Road). Now popular as a roadside tree throughout China, because of its history it is known in Chinese as the "French plane".

By the 1920s, the French Concession was developed into the premier residential area of Shanghai. In particular, the expansive and initially sparsely populated "New French Concession" obtained under the second expansion of 1914 became popular for foreign nationals of all nationalities, and later well-to-do Chinese residents as well, to build houses on larger plots of land than they could obtain in the more crowded original concessions. As demand grew, numerous apartment buildings at varying levels of luxury were built, as well as some shikumen residences to meet demand from the increasing number of Chinese residents. Vibrant commercial areas also developed, helped by the influx of White Russians after the Russian Revolution.

=== World War II era ===
In 1937, during the Battle of Shanghai, the Chinese bombed the concession twice by mistake and killed several hundred people. When the Japanese took Shanghai in battle, their troops crossed the International Settlement unopposed. However, at the entrance of the French Concession, Vice Admiral Jules Le Bigot, then commanding the Naval Forces in the Far East, sat on a folding chair in the middle of the street in front of their vehicles. He forced them to negotiate, finally letting only an unarmed supply convoy pass. On 4 December 1937, Japanese unarmed convoys were allowed to cross the concession.

As early as 1941, the occupation of Shanghai by the troops of the Japanese Empire forced tens of thousands of Chinese to take refuge in the concessions. The Bataillon mixte d'Infanterie coloniale de Chine (BMICC), many of whose troops were Annamese (Vietnamese), provided security.

In 1943, during World War II, the government of Vichy France announced that it would give up its concessions in Tianjin, Hankou and Guangzhou. These were handed over to the pro-Japanese Wang Jingwei government on 5 June 1943, with the Shanghai Concession following on 30 July.

=== After World War II ===
After the war, neither Vichy France nor Wang's Nationalist Government were universally recognised as legitimate. The Sino-French Accord of February 1946, signed by Chiang Kai-shek's ruling Kuomintang, led to Chinese troops pulling out of the northern half of French Indochina in exchange for France relinquishing all its foreign concessions in China.

The former French Concession remained largely unchanged during the early decades of Communist rule in China. In the late 1980s and the early 1990s, however, largely unregulated re-development of the area tore apart many old neighbourhoods. For example, the London plane trees on the former Avenue Joffre were removed in the 1990s, only to be later replaced after public outcry. The old French Club building and its gardens, which used to be a sports field in the early days, were removed and became the base of the high-rise Okura Garden Hotel.

=== After the 2000s ===
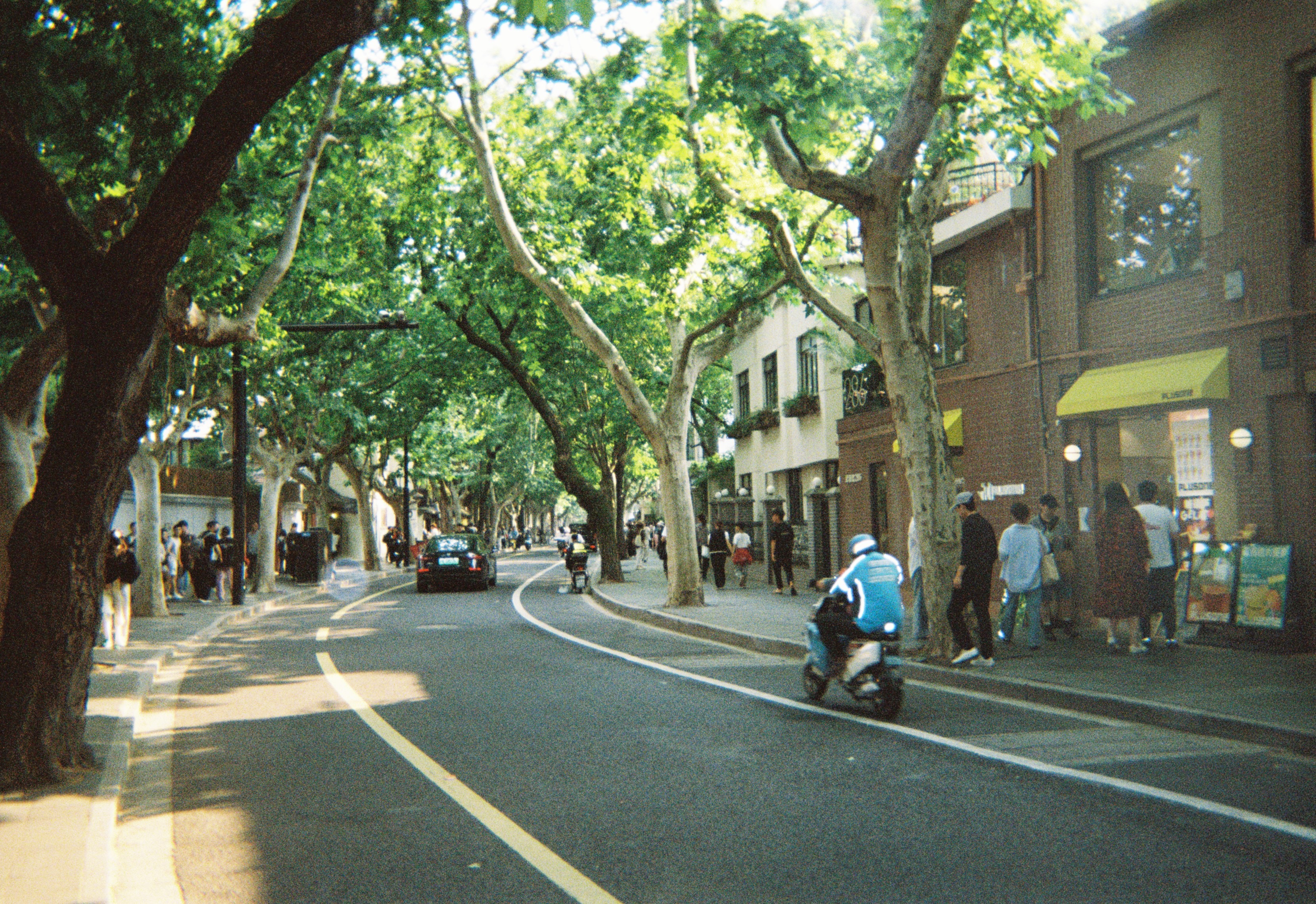
Wukang Road in 2025

After the 2000s, the government enforced more stringent development and planning controls in this area. The municipal government began to promote heritage protection alongside the city's rapid growth. Authorities designated large areas of the former French Concession as historical-cultural conservation zones, often branding it as "Hengfu (Hengshan Rd.–Fuxing Rd.) Historical and Cultural Area".

In 2007, the city launched its first renovation conservation plan for the district, with efforts including the protection of the original street patterns, plane-tree-lined avenues, iconic lilong neighborhoods, and other historically significant buildings. Wukang Road, among all historic roads, was first selected to be renovated, turning the historic but decayed-looking road into a delicate, attractive area with cafés and boutiques for tourists and high-income residents with diverse backgrounds. The project's success subsequently became a template for other redevelopment cases across the Hengfu area in the former French Concession.

== Redevelopment and gentrification ==
The former French Concession has experienced substantial gentrification since the 1990s. The formerly mostly residential area was turned into a commercial district with trendy cafes, restaurants, bars, art galleries, and boutique retail stores. High-end shopping malls, such as iAPM Mall (opened 2013), and luxury apartments emerge along Avenue Joffre, making the area among the most expensive in Shanghai.

The redevelopment was initially led by the government, which was later taken over by a property-led scheme carried out by developers worldwide. The best-known case is Xintiandi, where developers and the government cooperated to convert a previously old residential area into a space of dining, retail, and entertainment. The redevelopment kept the architecture of the existing Shikumen houses built by French developers while renovating their interiors to fit modern needs. Shanghai's unique redevelopment is marked by the return of capital and globalization that links to its cosmopolitan past during the colonial periods, despite wars and socialist periods that intervened.

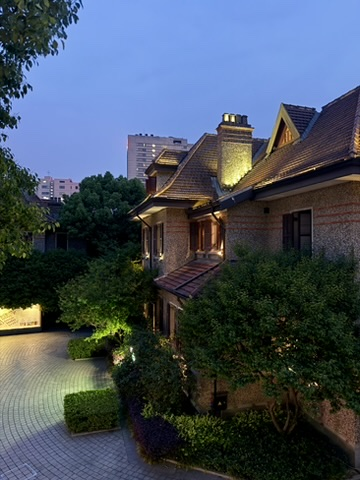
Renovated Western Architecture

That said, the gentrification also sparked debate about the use of public space. For example, during Xintiandi's renovation, 25,000 local families and 800 work units were displaced. Critics pointed out that the fake, nostalgic bourgeoisie aesthetic of the renovation can erase original communities and contribute to rising inequality.

== Cultural and Historical Significance ==
Throughout the 18th and 19th centuries, the French Concession also served a significant role in shaping China's political and cultural modernity. Its foreign extraterritoriality provided a relatively autonomous space from both Chinese administrations and foreign governments, allowing writers, artists, intellectuals, journalists, and revolutionaries to stay and establish networks, especially those who were persecuted by the Qing and later Nationalist surveillance.

=== Political Impact ===
The founding father of China's modern republic, Sun Yat-sen, and his wife, Soong Ching-ling, were associated with the district. They lived on Rue Molière (today's 7 Xiangshan Road) during the 1910s and 1920s, and Soong continued to live there until 1937 after Sun died. During Sun's time living there, he drafted famous works like “The International Development of China.” After his death, Soong continued to contribute to politics while living there, advocating for a united front across the Kuomintang and the CCP in countering Japan's invasion. The communists’ early underground networks also took place within the concession. The area's political tolerance, made possible by its extraterritorial status, allowed dissenting movements to survive.

=== Cultural Impact ===
By the 1930s, a new cultural phenomenon called “Haipai” had taken root in Shanghai, with the French Concession serving as its birthplace and backdrop. Haipai's hybrid aesthetics combined Shanghainese life with Western Urbanism, creating a uniquely Shanghainese awareness that later became iconic to the city's cultural identity. Among the most famous Haipai writers was Eileen Chang, who lived and studied in the district, drew heavily on its plane-tree boulevards, shikumen neighbourhoods, and ambiguous social intimacies — Works including "Love in a Fallen City" and "The Golden Cangue," both of which she finished during her time living at Changde Apartment, rendered the concession as a space of melancholy glamour, moral tension, and distinctly Shanghai modernity. Depictions of modern women, popular culture, and consumption habits have been common themes of Haipai Culture, marking a significant step towards cultural and economic modernity during republican China.

The concession also exhibited distinct architectural styles that merged both European aesthetics and local Shanghainese culture. Tree-lined boulevards such as Avenue Joffre and Avenue Pétain, rows of shikumen houses, and Art Deco apartment buildings like the Normandie Apartments (Wukang Mansion) created a unique mixture of French urbanism with local communities. Today, these architectures remain central to public discussions and popular culture, thanks to renovation efforts. Sites such as the Normandie Apartments became a viral tourist attraction through social media platforms like Xiaohongshu.

== Extent ==
From 1914 until its abolition, the French Concession covered the north-eastern part of today's Xuhui District and the western part of Huangpu District (the former Luwan District), occupying the centre, south, and west of urban Shanghai. A small strip extended eastward along the rue du Consulat, now the East Jinling Road, to the Quai de France, now East-2 Zhongshan Road, which runs along the Huangpu River to the south of the Bund.

To the southeast of the French Concession was the walled Chinese city. To the north was the British concession, later part of the Shanghai International Settlement. The British and French quarters were separated by several canals: in the east, this was "Yangjingbang", a creek flowing into the Huangpu River. These canals were later filled in and became Avenue Edward VII in the east and Avenue Foch in the west, both now part of Yan'an Road. To the south, the French Concession was bounded by the Zhaojiabang canal (now filled in as Zhaojiabang Road and Xujiahui Road).

== Governance ==
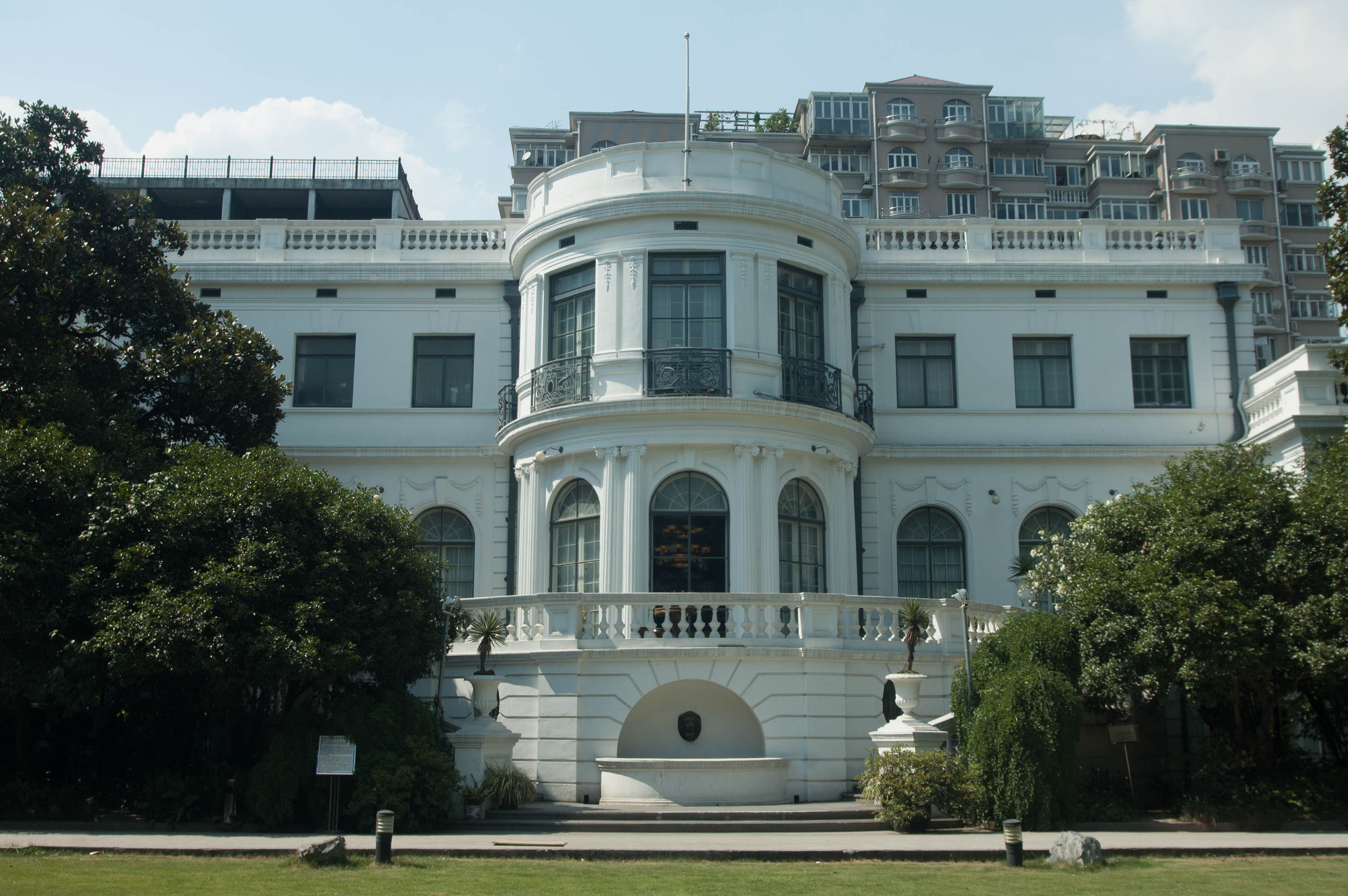
Official residence of the president of the Municipal Council

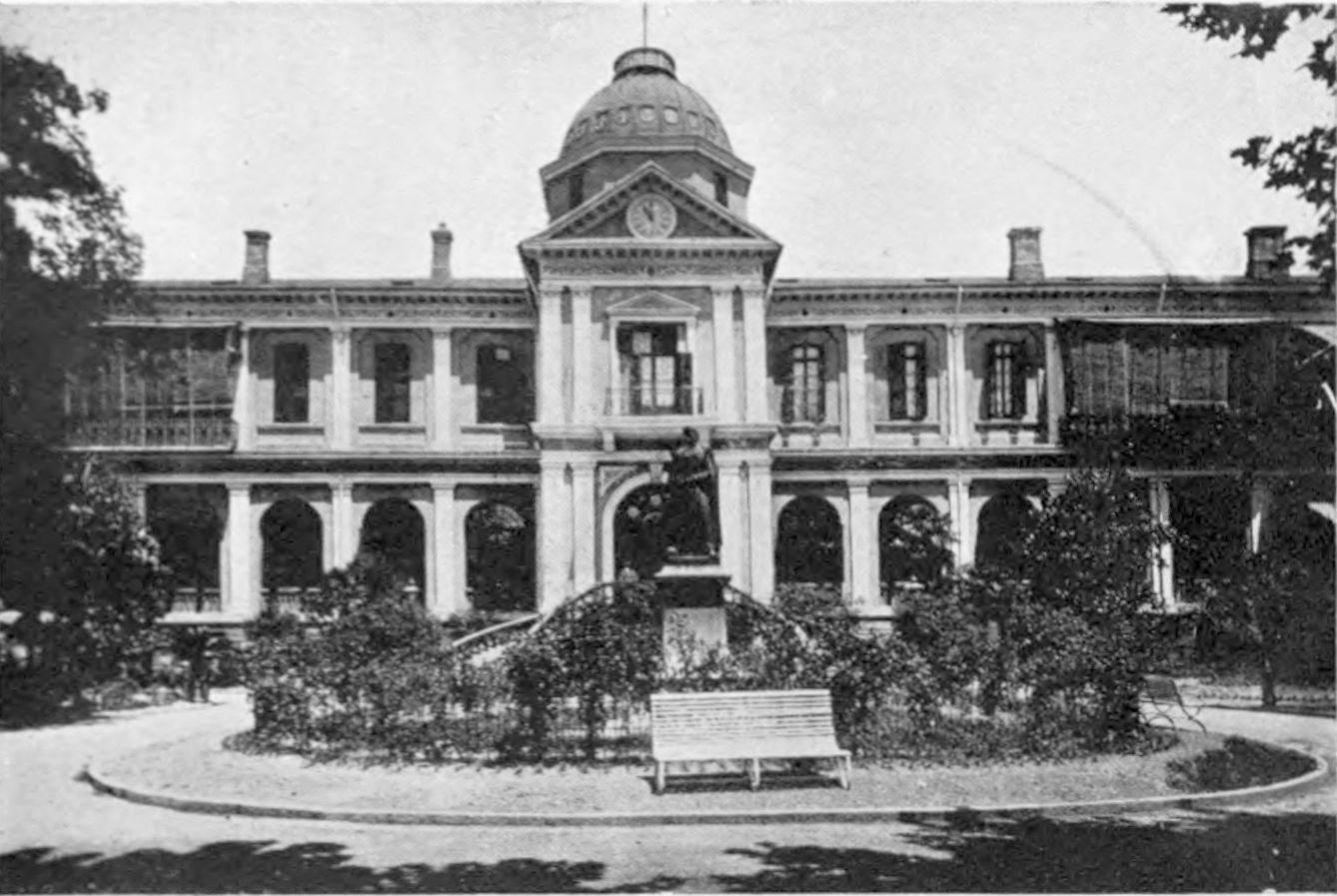
The first French Municipal Council building on rue du Consulat, c. 1908

The chief French official in charge of the French Concession was the consul-general of France in Shanghai. While the French initially participated in the Municipal Council of the International Settlement, in 1862 a decision was made to exit the Municipal Council to preserve the French Concession's independence. From then on, a day-to-day governance was carried out by the Municipal Administrative Council (conseil d'administration municipale). The council's offices were originally on rue du Consulat, the "high street" or rue principale of the original concession. In 1909, a new building was completed on Avenue Joffre. This building is now part of a shopping centre.

Security in the Concession was maintained by the Shanghai French Police. Just as the British employed many Indian police in the International Settlement, the French deployed many personnel from its nearby colony of Annam. A militia, the corps de volontaires, was first raised in the 1850s to protect the Concession during the Taiping Rebellion. From 1915 a battalion of Tirailleurs Tonkinese (colonial infantry) from French Indochina provided a military garrison for the French Concession.

As a treaty power which had been granted extraterritorial jurisdiction, France exercised consular jurisdiction in the French Concession. Cases involving French nationals were heard by the French consular court. Matters involving Chinese nationals, or nationals of non-treaty powers, were heard in the International Mixed Court for the French Concession, a court nominally headed by a Chinese official but "assisted" by French consular officials, and using an adapted version of Chinese procedural rules. The International Mixed Court was abolished in 1930 and replaced by Chinese courts under the judicial system of the Republic of China.

The Shanghai French Detachment was responsible for providing a military presence.

== Demography ==
While the French Concession began as a settlement for the French, it soon attracted residents of various nationalities.

In the 1920s, with the expansion of the French Concession, British and American merchants who worked in the International Settlement often chose to build more spacious houses in the newer part of the French Concession. One legacy of this Anglophone presence is the American College (now Shanghai American School) on Avenue Pétain (now Hengshan Road), and the nearby Community Church.

Shanghai saw a large influx of Russian émigrés in the wake of the 1917 Russian Revolution. This raised the Russian population in the French Concession from 41 in 1915 to 7,000. This number increased to 8,260 by 1934 after the Japanese occupation of northeast China, where many Russians worked on the Chinese Eastern Railway. Two Russian Orthodox churches can still be seen in the former French Concession. The Russian community had a large presence on commercial streets such as Avenue Joffre and contributed to the development of the music profession in Shanghai.

The Chinese population in the French Concession swelled during the Taiping Rebellion, reaching about 500,000 just before the start of the Second Sino-Japanese War. During World War II, Japanese forces initially occupied only the Chinese areas, leaving the foreign concessions alone. Residents of the Chinese areas moved into the French Concession in large numbers, reaching 825,342.

== Localities ==
- Lokawei (Chinese: 卢家湾; pinyin: Lújiāwān), "Lu's Bay", an area named after a bend on the Zhaojiabang creek. The main police depot and prison of the French concession was located here. Former Luwan District, today part of Huangpu District, was named after this locality. Since the 1990s, this area has seen high volume residential developments.
- Zikawei ("Xu's Confluence", or "Xujiahui" in Mandarin), an area named after the family of Xu Guangqi and the confluence of two local rivers. While Xujiahui was technically not part of the French Concession (lying immediately west of the boundary of the concession), it was the center of Catholic Shanghai, featuring St Ignatius Cathedral, the Observatory, the Library, and several colleges, all of which were French-dominated. Today, Xujiahui is a busy commercial district. Today's Xuhui District is named after this locality.
- Avenue Joffre, now Central Huaihai Road, was a boulevard stretching across the French Concession in an east–west direction. The road was renamed after Joseph Joffre in 1916, with the new name unveiled by the marshal himself in 1922. Avenue Joffre was a tram route. Its eastern section featured Shikumen residences. Its western part featured high-end residential developments, including standalone houses and apartment blocks. The central section was – and is – a popular shopping area, with many shops opened by the Russian community. The former Avenue Joffre remains a high-end retail district.
- Avenue Pétain, now Hengshan Road, was a major boulevard linking Xujiahui with the centre of the French Concession. It represented the centre of the French Concession's high-end residential district and featured many mansions and expensive apartment buildings. Beginning in the 1990s, some of the former houses had been converted into bars and nightclubs. Although some bars remain, recent years have seen the street become more residential.

=== Historical buildings in the French Concession ===
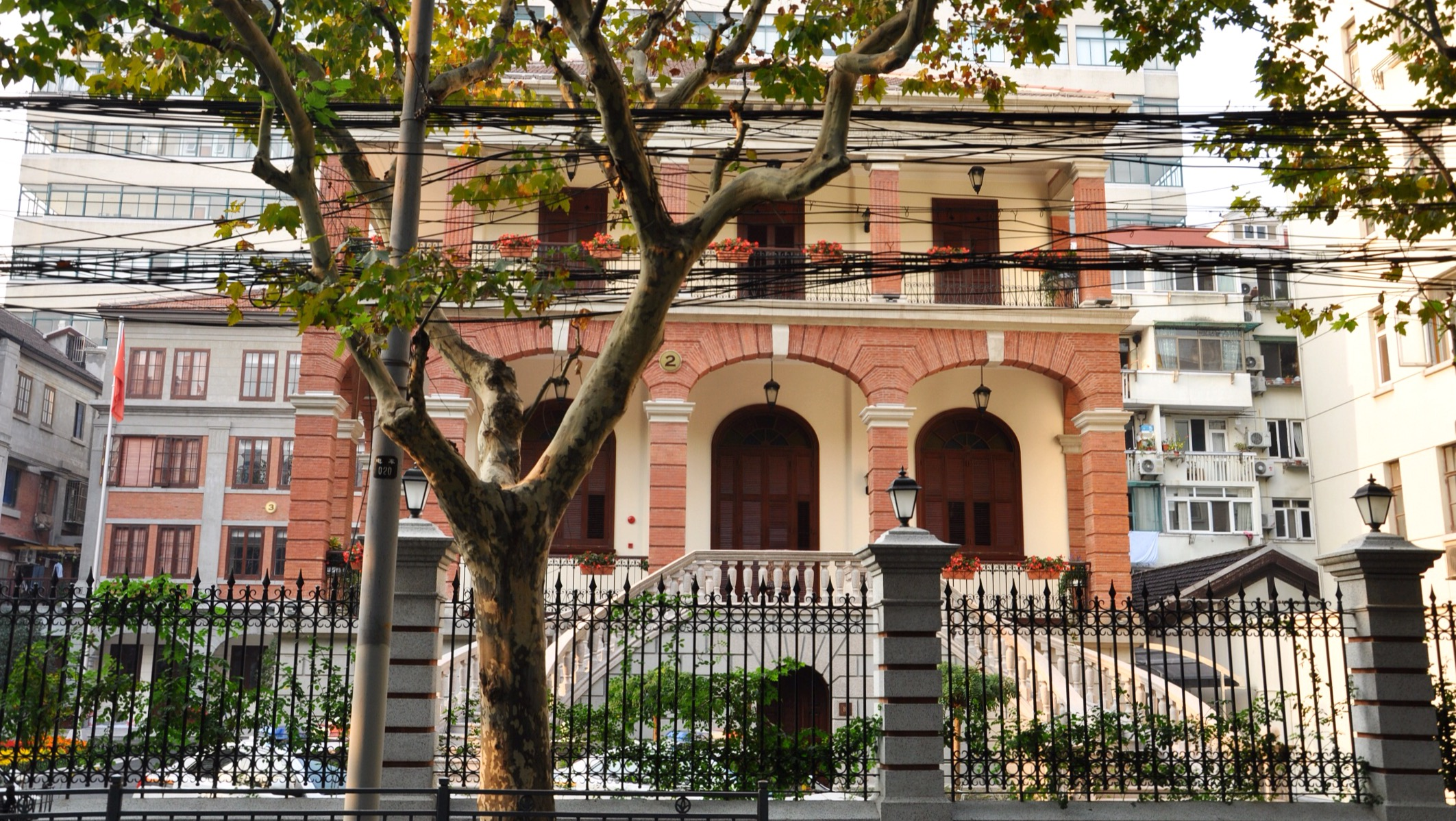
Former site of the International Mixed Court for the French Concession

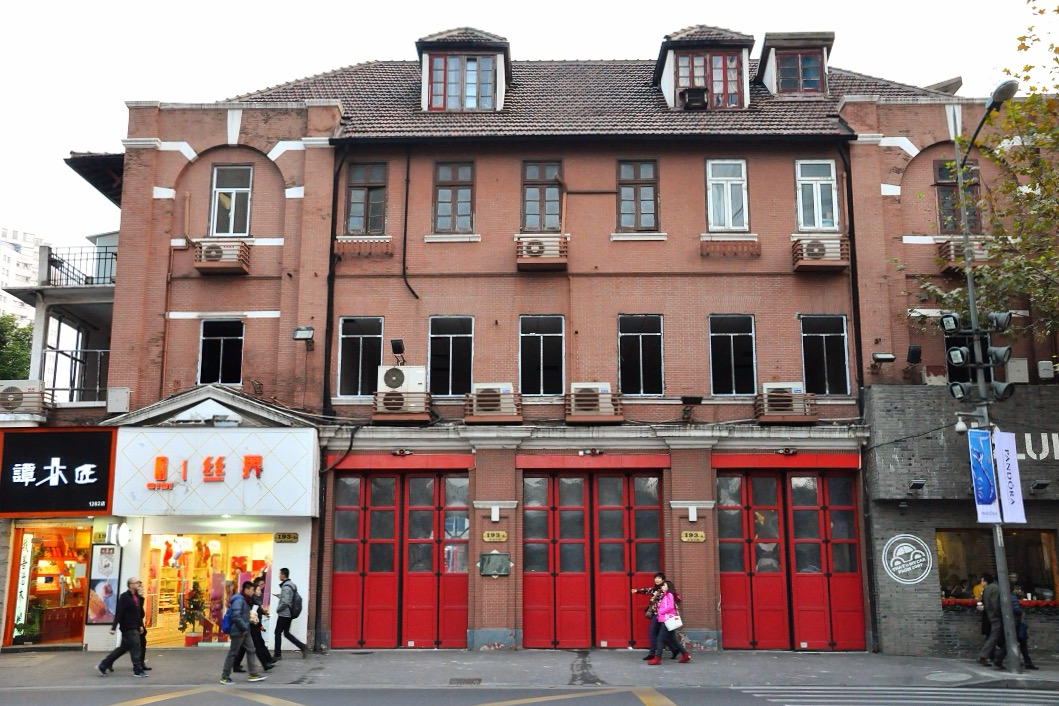
Former Route Paul Brunat fire station

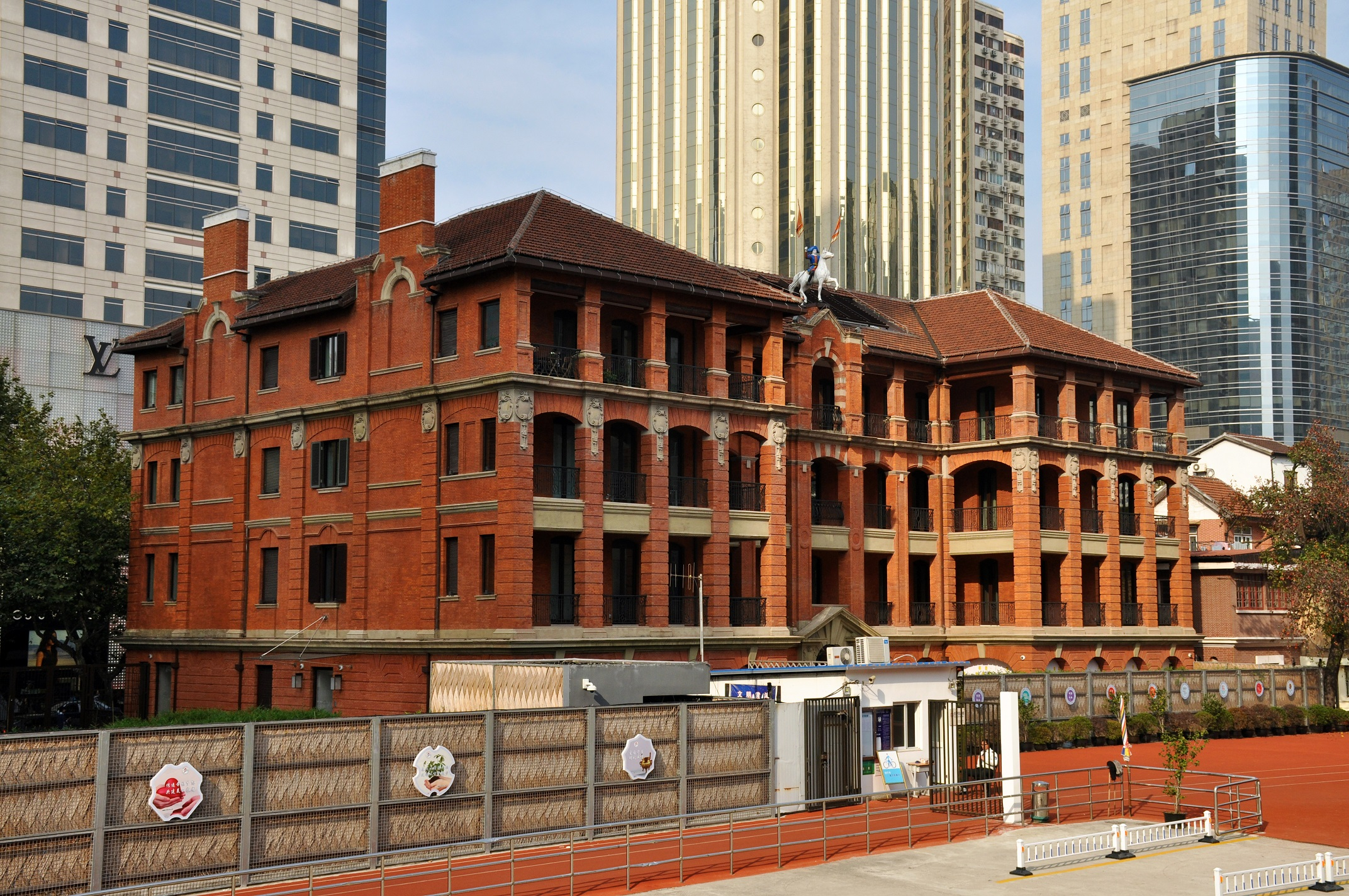
Former Avenue Joffre police station

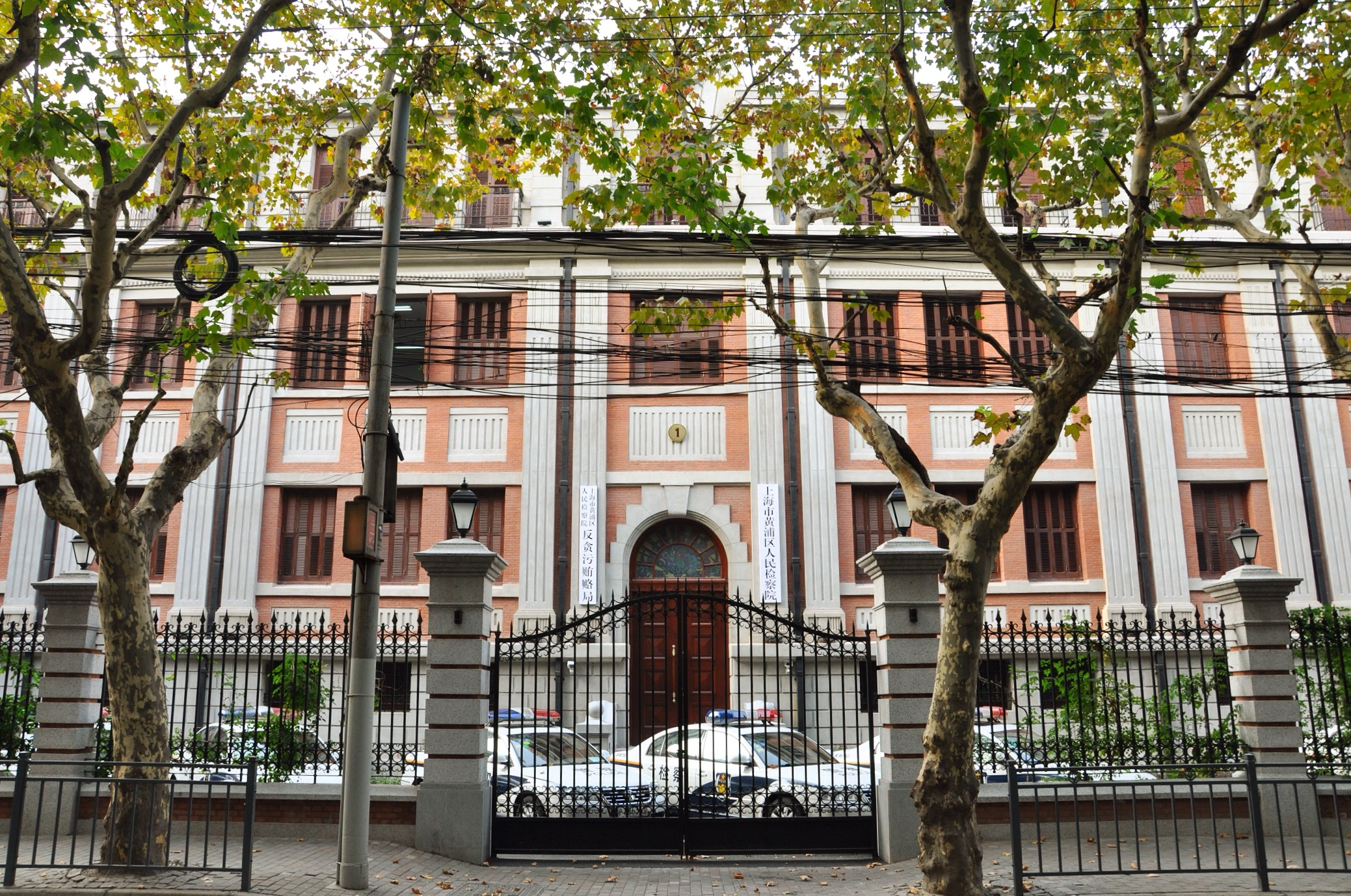
Former Garde Municipale headquarters

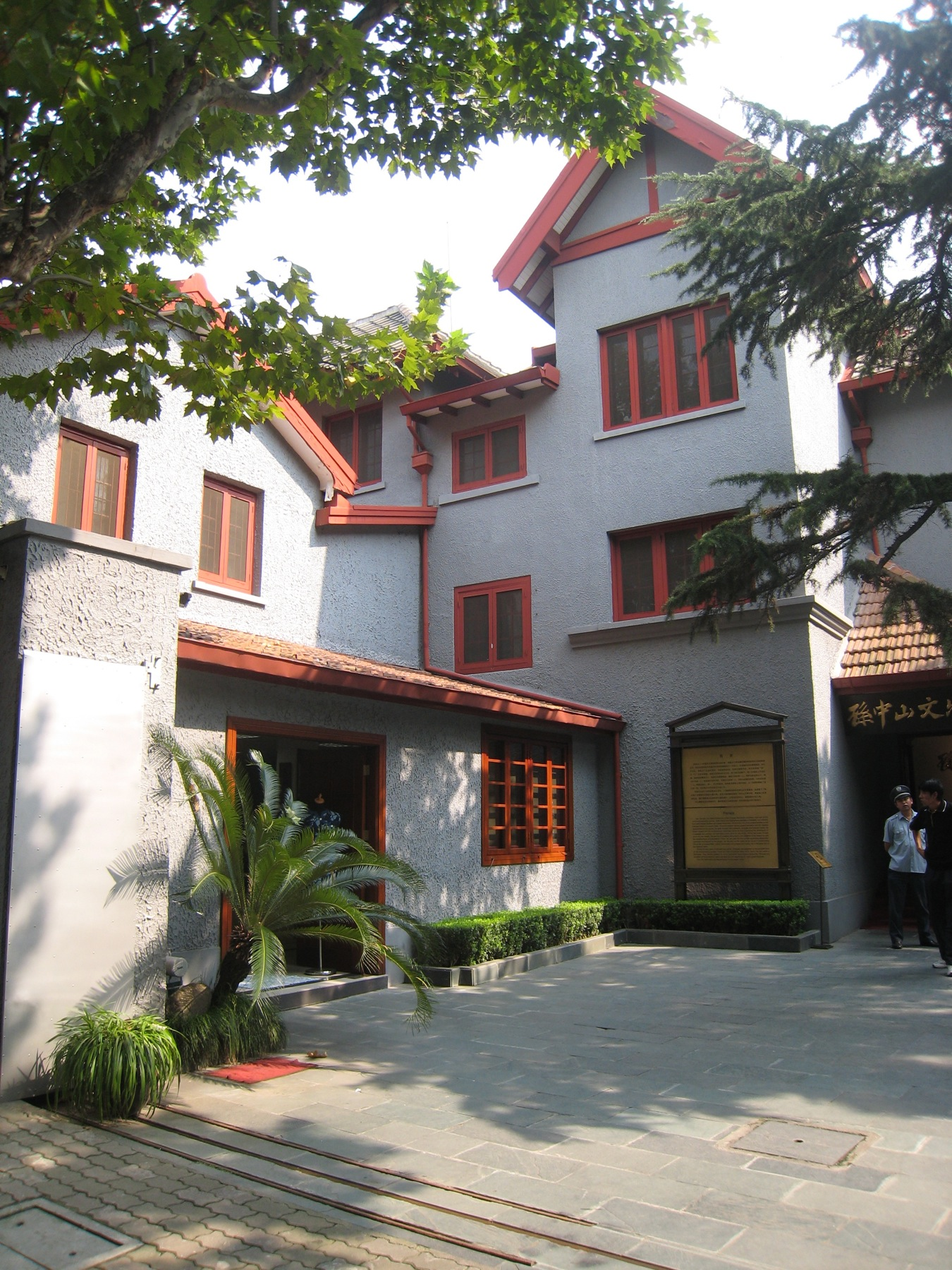
Former residence of Sun Yat-sen

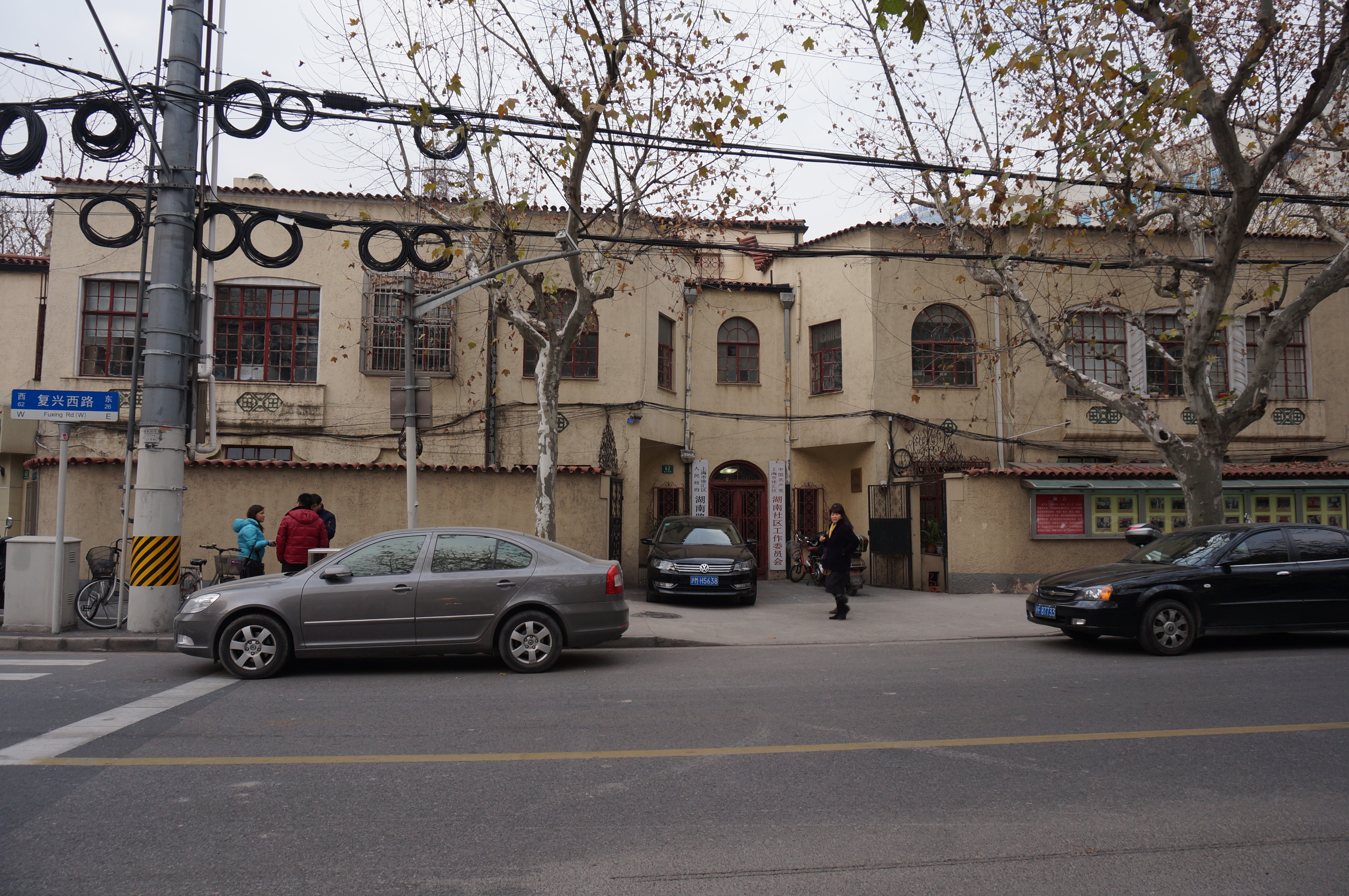
The Cloisters, a residential building

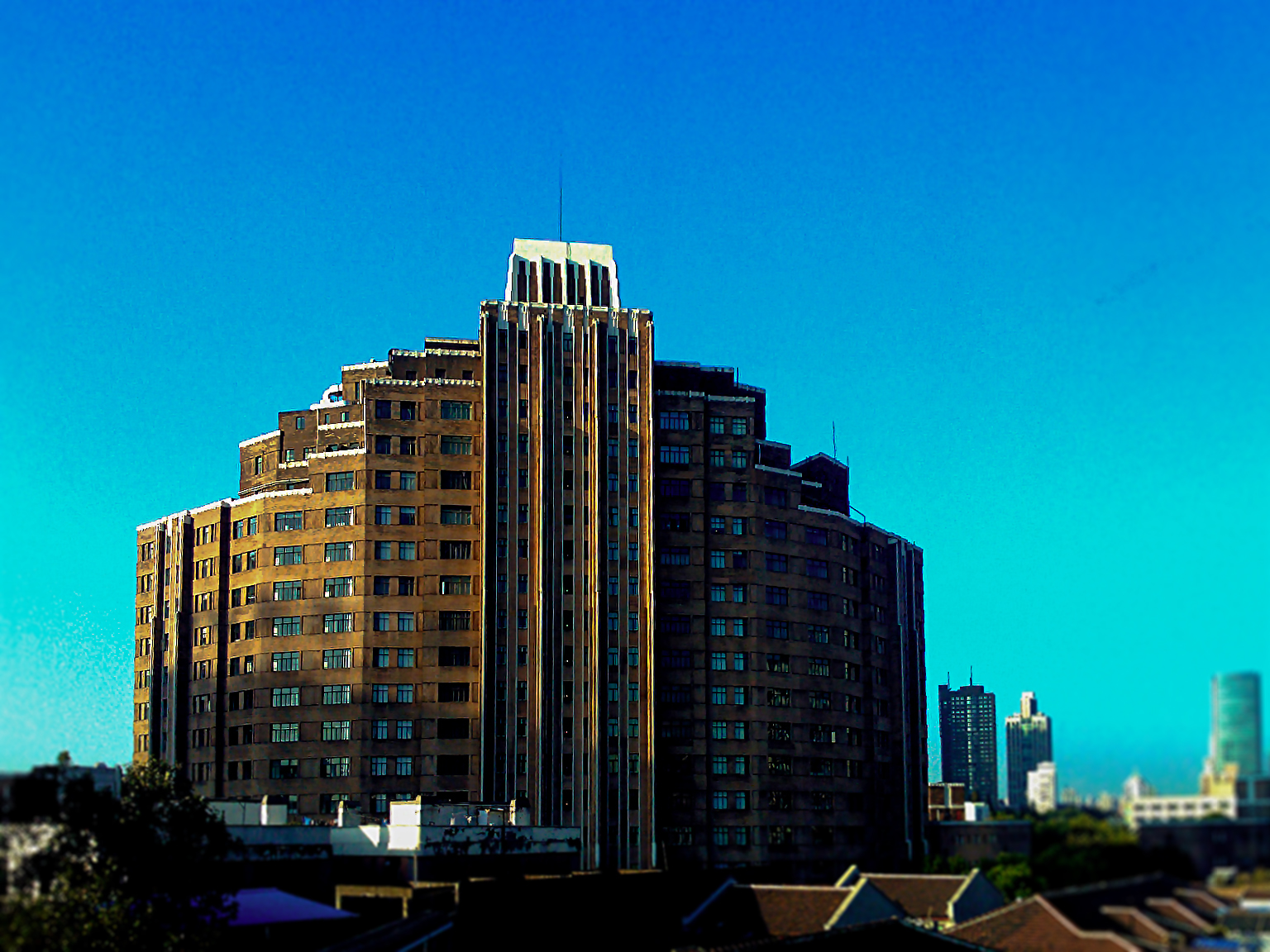
Grosvenor House, an apartment building, now part of a hotel

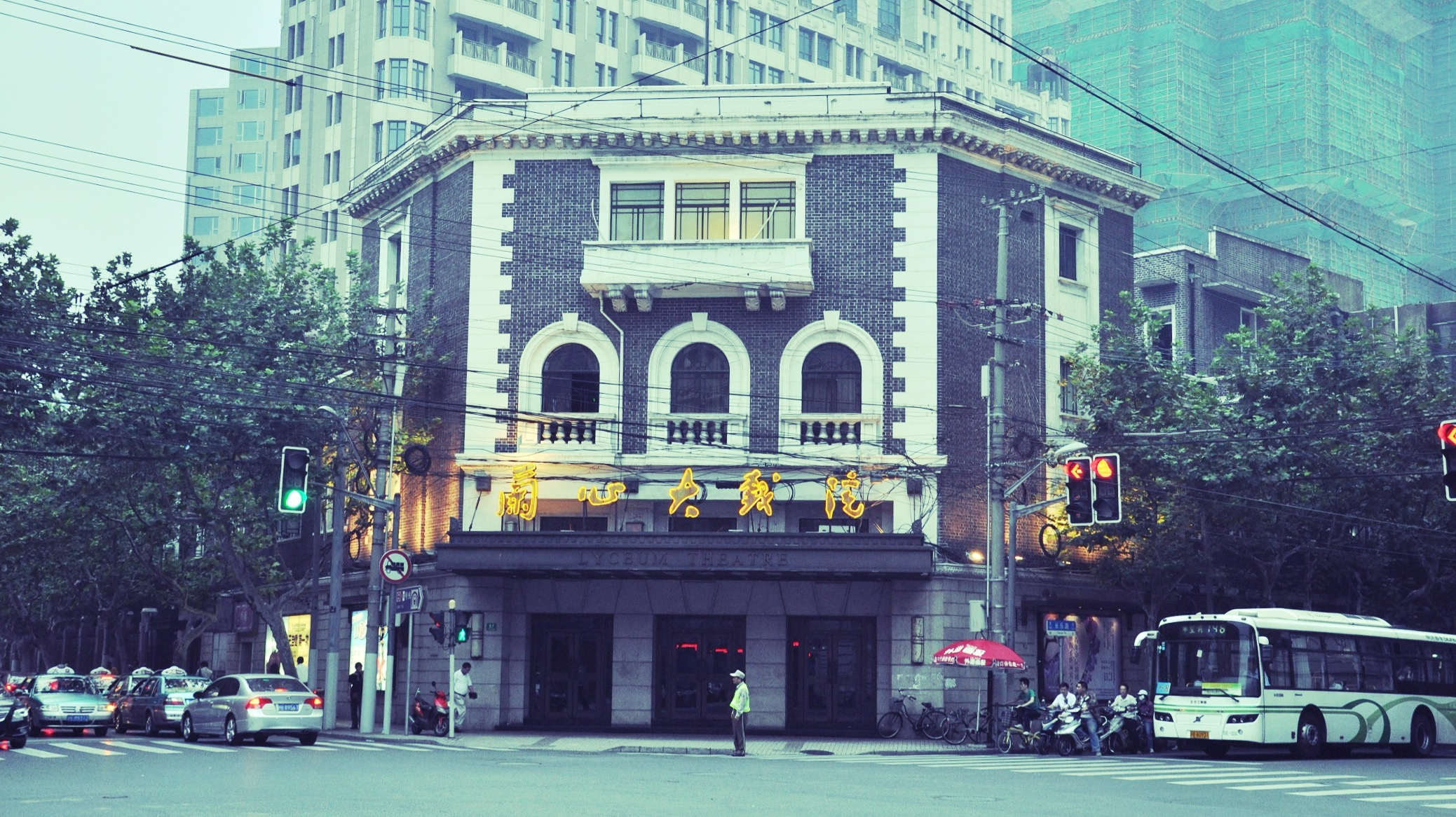
Lyceum Theatre, mainly used by British residents

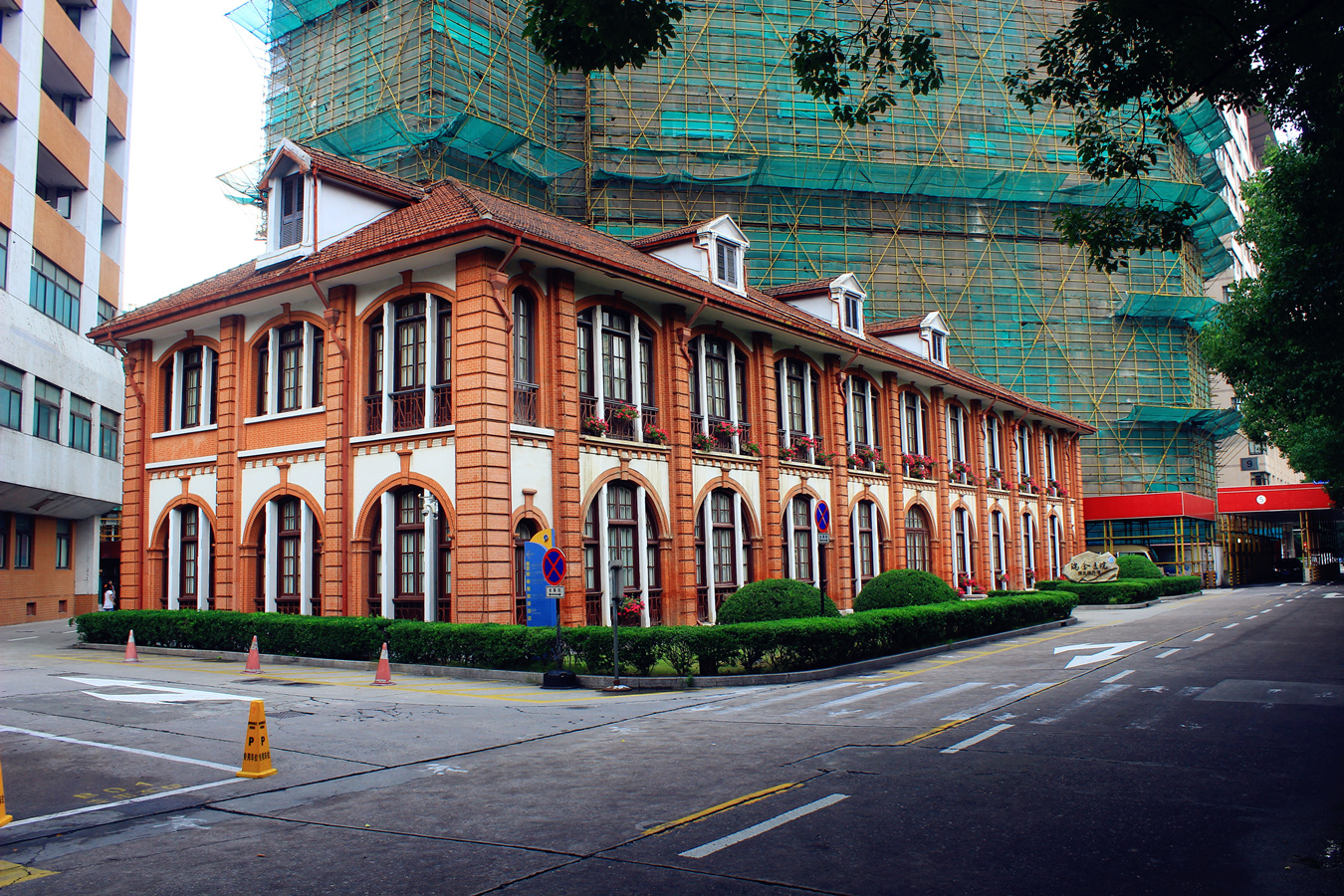
Former Hôpital Sainte-Marie

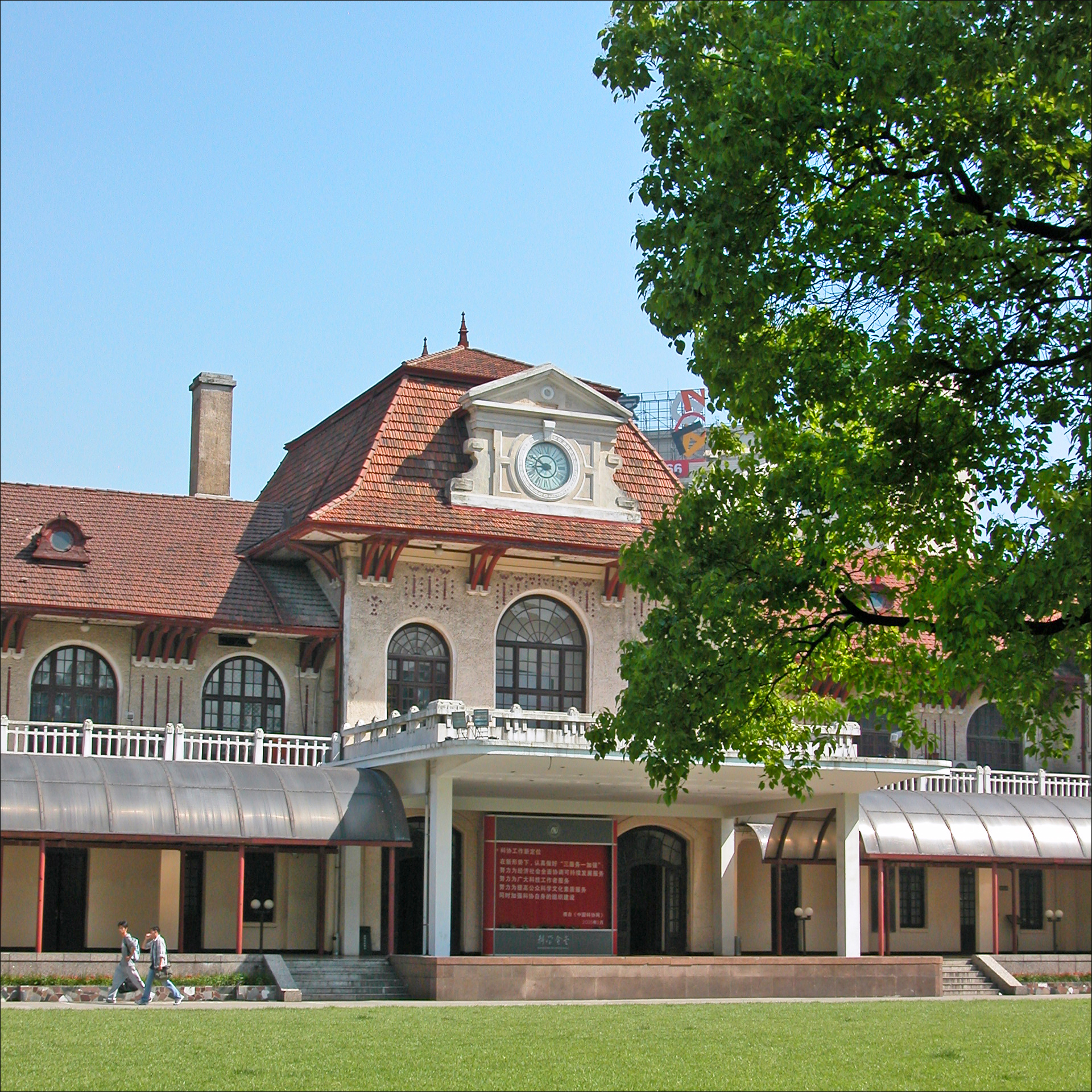
The Shanghai Science Hall, built in 1917, formerly a French school

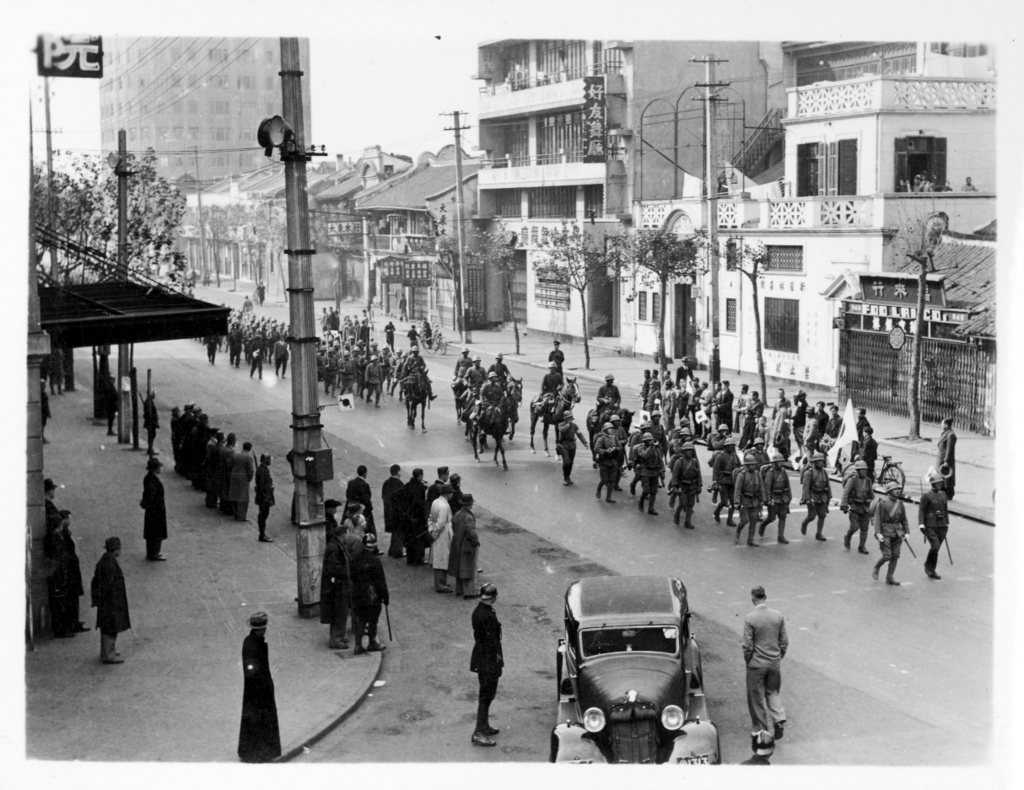
1937 photograph of Japanese troops entering inside the French Concession

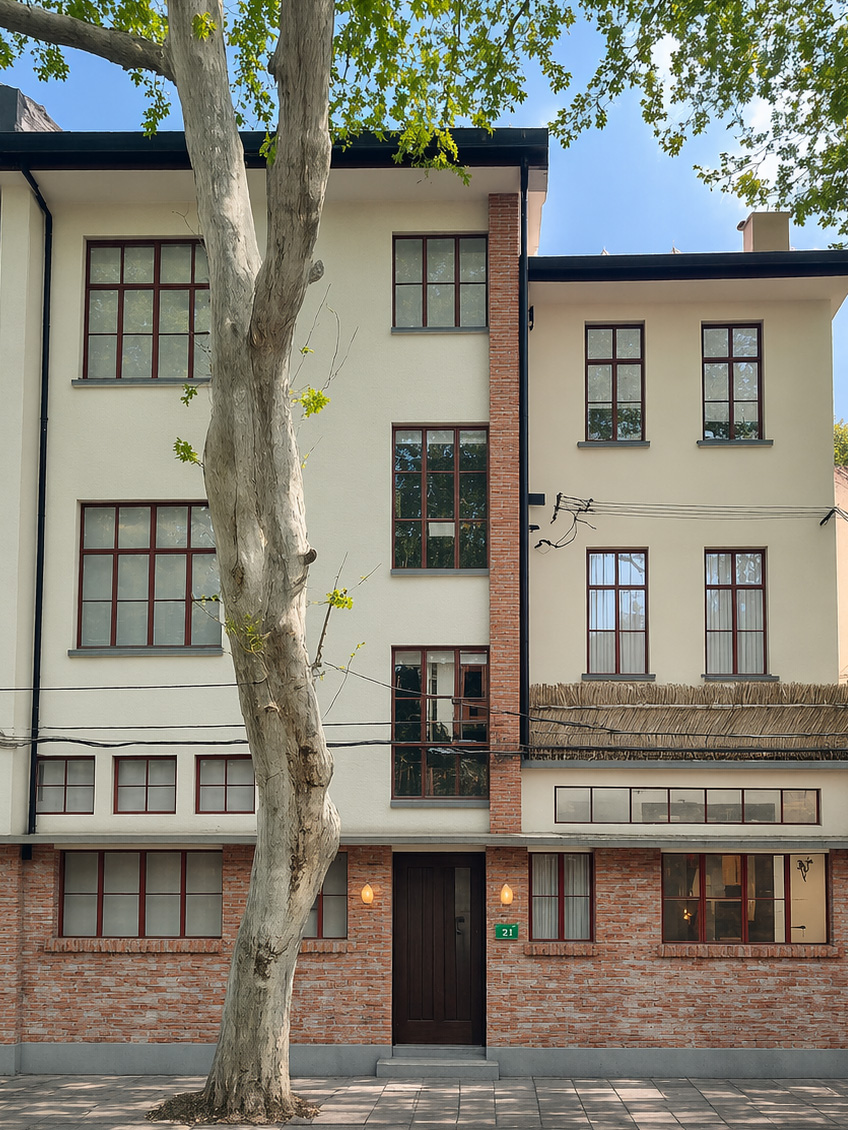
Ambelie Gallery, built in 1945

== See also ==
- Concessions in China
- French colonial empire
- List of French possessions and colonies
- Old City of Shanghai
- Shanghai International Settlement
- American Concession in Shanghai
