= Xujiahui =

Locality in Shanghai

Coordinates: 31°11′N 121°26′E

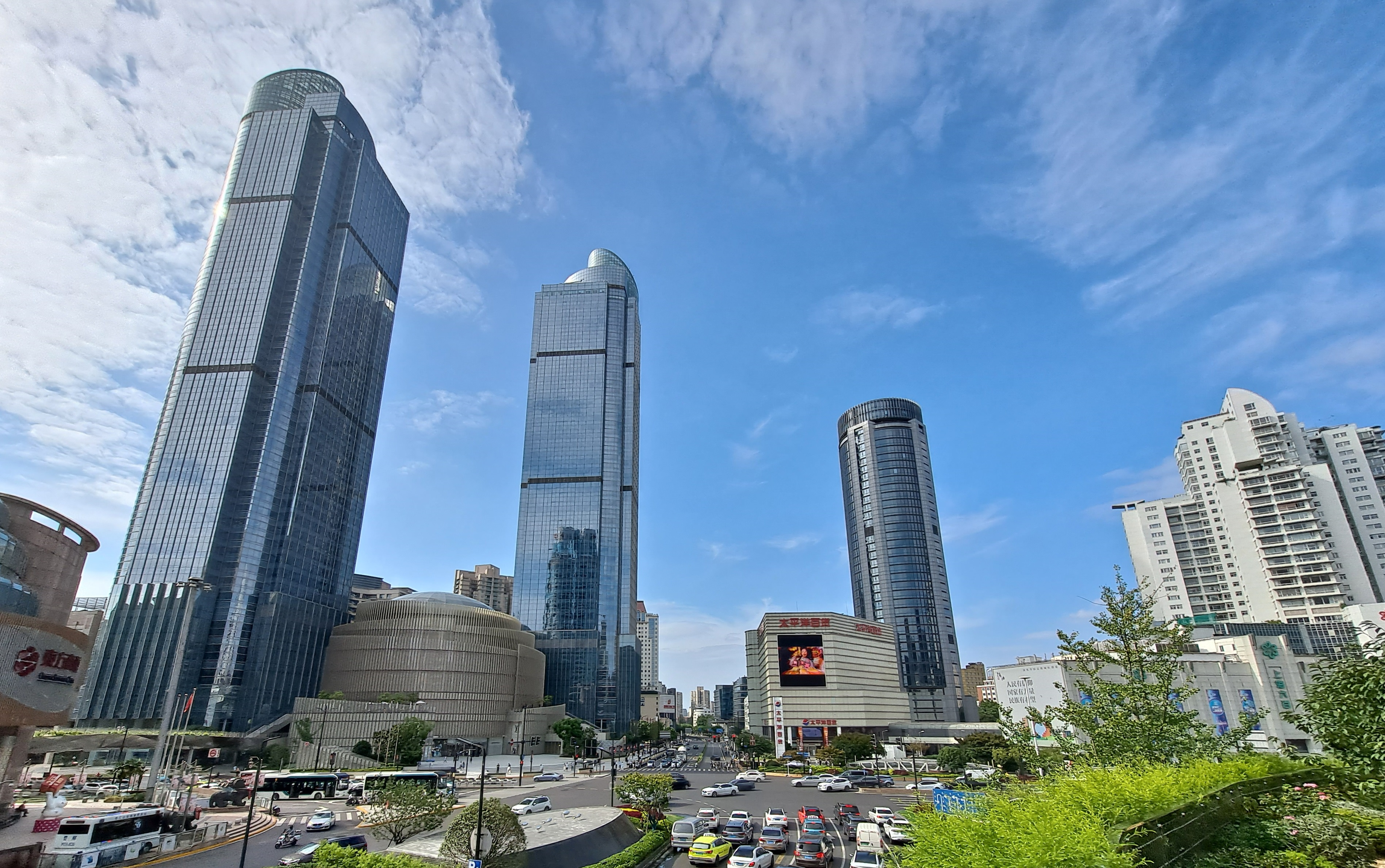
- Central shopping district of Xujiahui
- Simplified Chinese: 徐家汇
- Traditional Chinese: 徐家匯
- Literal meaning: Xu family junction
Transcriptions
Standard Mandarin
- Hanyu Pinyin: Xújiāhuì
Wu
- Wugniu: ^{6}zhi-ka_{1}-we_{6}

Xujiahui (simplified Chinese: 徐家汇; traditional Chinese: 徐家匯, Wu Chinese pronunciation: [ʑ̥i˨ ka̠˥ ɦɯe̞˨˩], romanized as: Zikawei, Ziccawei, or Siccawei) is a locality in Shanghai. It is a historic area of commerce and culture administratively within Xuhui District, which is named after the locality. The area is a well-known precinct for shopping and entertainment in Shanghai. It is served by the Xujiahui Station of the Shanghai Metro.

== Name ==
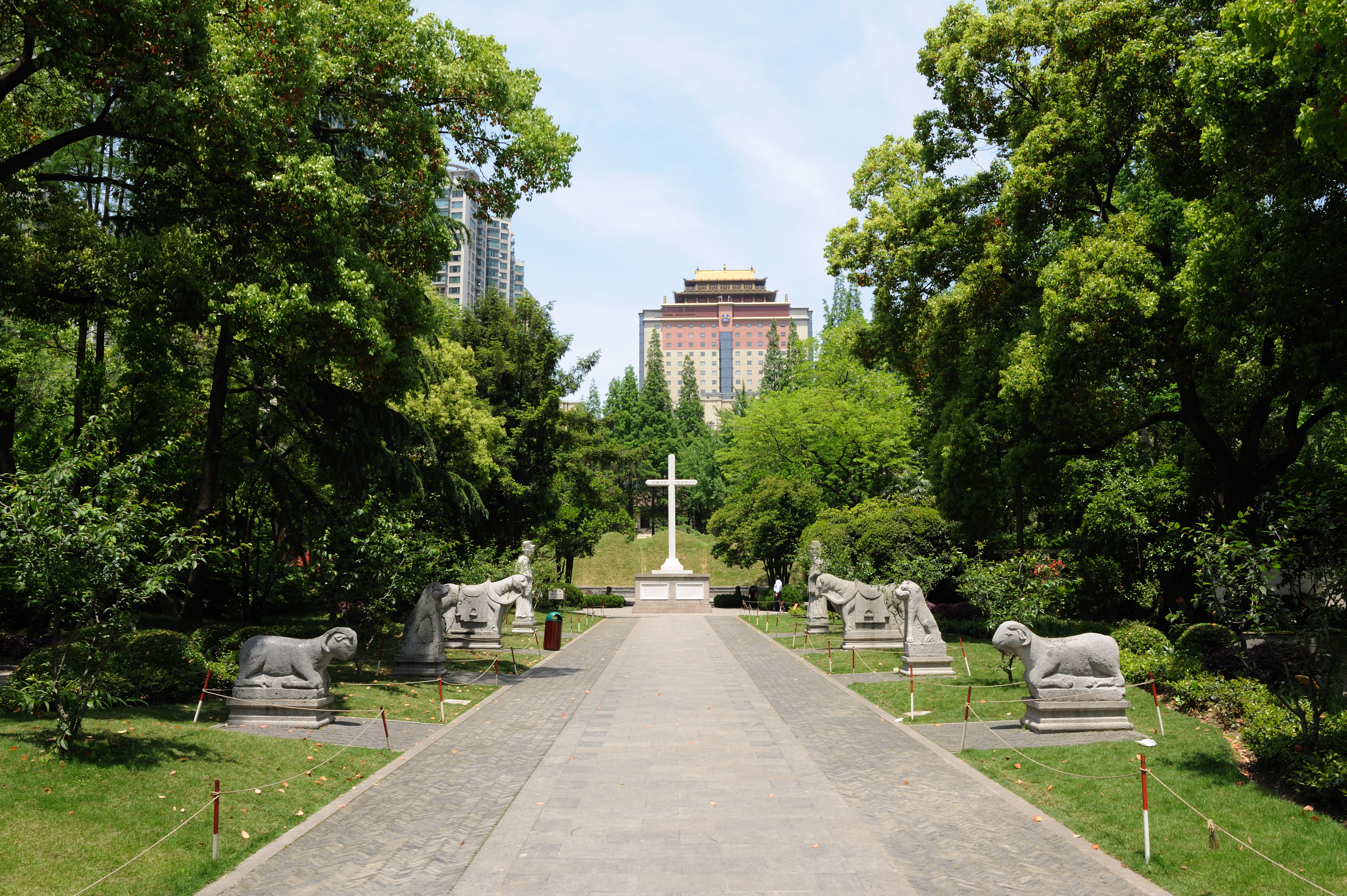
The tomb of Xu Guangqi in Xujiahui, Shanghai.

Xujiahui means "Xu family junction" - more precisely, "property of Xu family at the junction of two rivers". The "Xu family" refers to the family of Xu Guangqi (Hsü Kuang-ch'i; 1562–1633), China's most notable Catholic convert. Most of what is now Xujiahui was once the ancestral home of the Xu family. Baptized by famed Italian Jesuit, Matteo Ricci, Xu Guangqi and his descendants donated large plots of land to the Catholic Church, including the site of the St. Ignatius Cathedral.

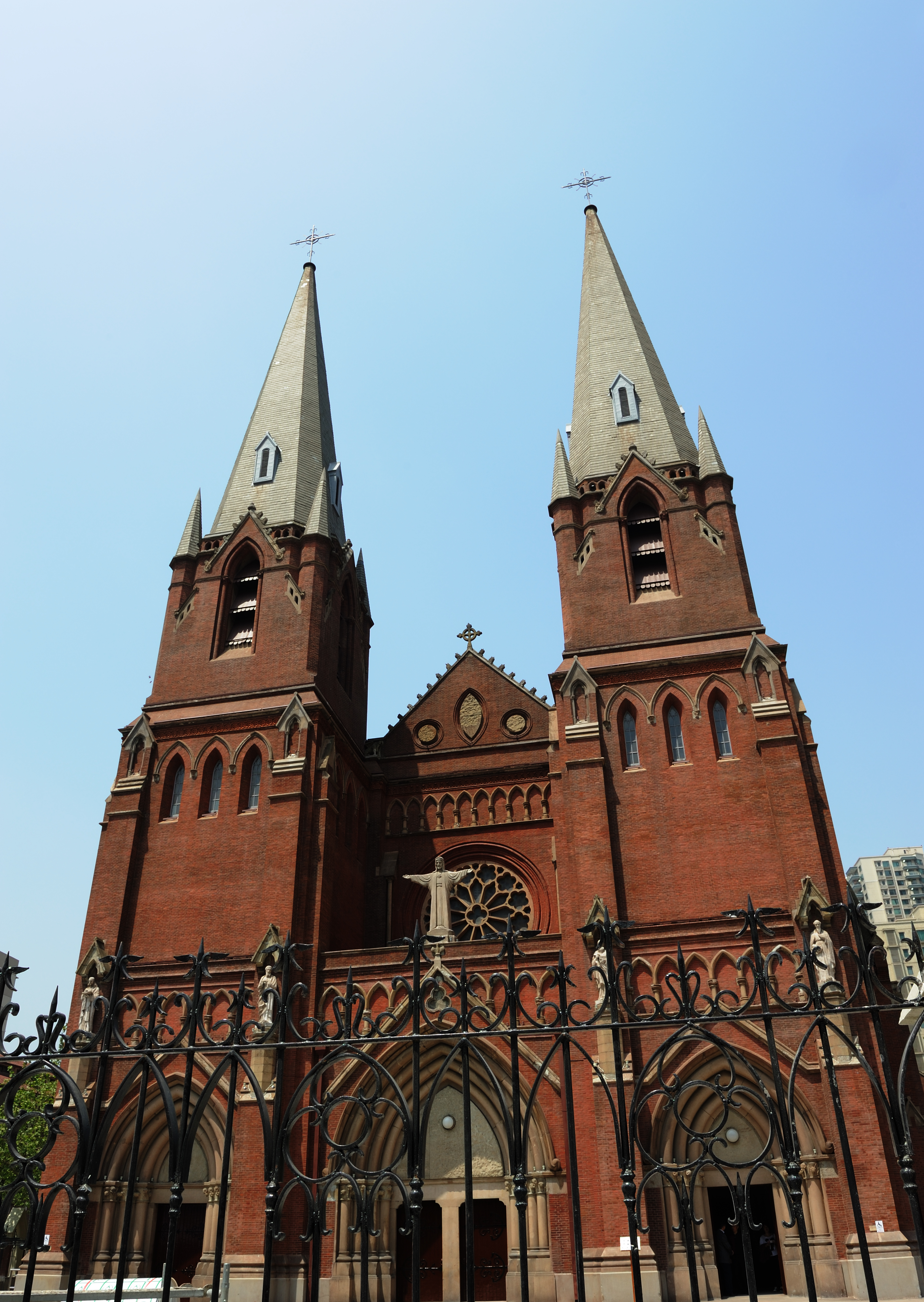
St. Ignatius Cathedral, Xujiahui, Shanghai.

During the 18th century it was known by Shanghai's western residents as "Ziccawei" or "Siccawei" in English, and "Zikawei" or "Zi-ka-wei" in French, from the pronunciation of its name in Shanghainese. These names survive in the names of some institutions, such as the Bibliotheca Zi-Ka-Wei, and the area is still listed in a number of contemporary guidebooks and literature as "Zikawei" or some variant thereof.

== History ==
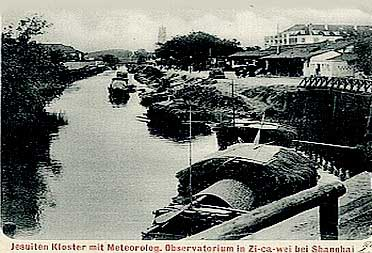
A river scene, with the mission and observatory, caption reads (in German): "Jesuiten Kloster mit Meteorolog. Observatorium in Zi-ca-wei bei Shanghai"

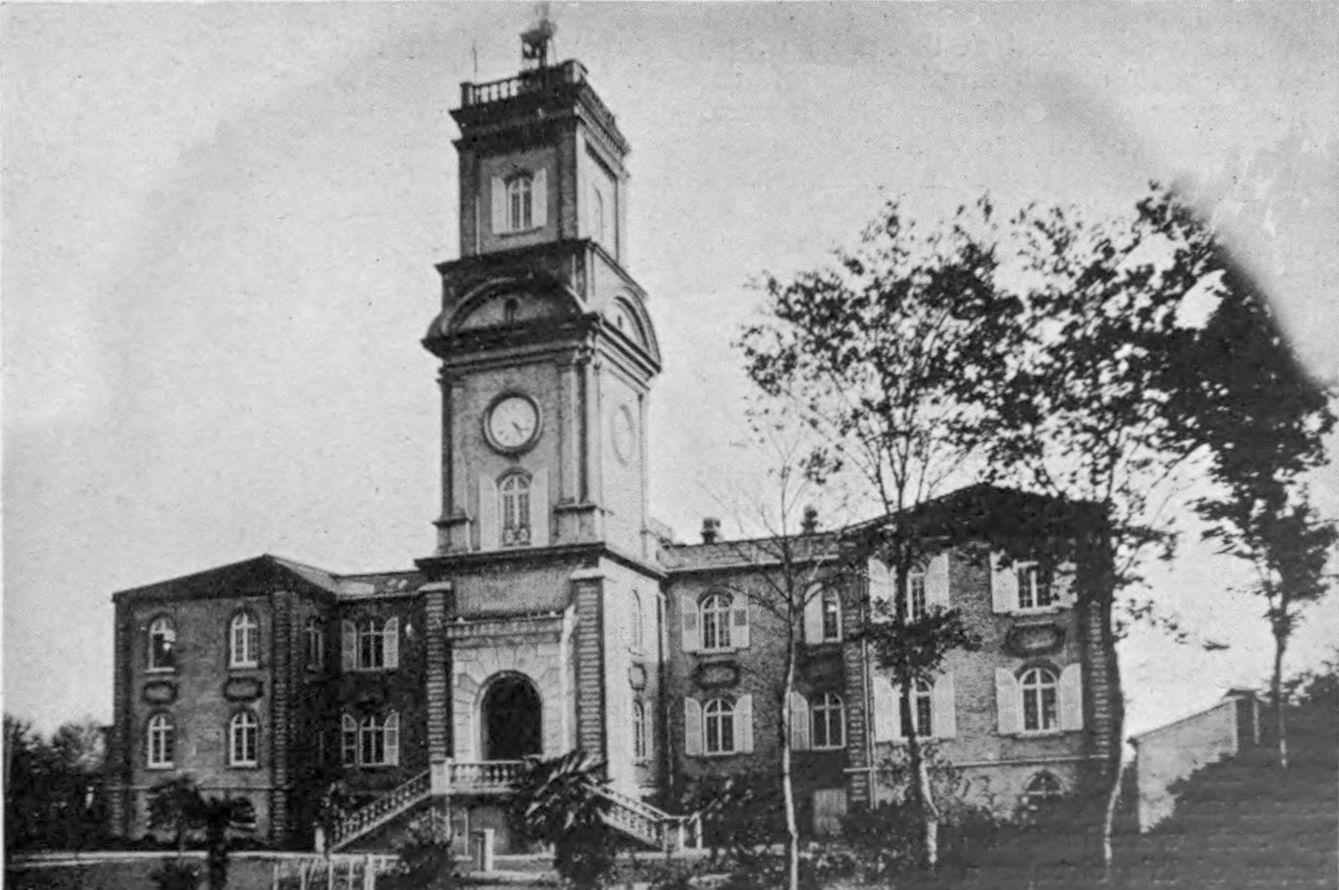
The Siccawei Observatory, c. 1908

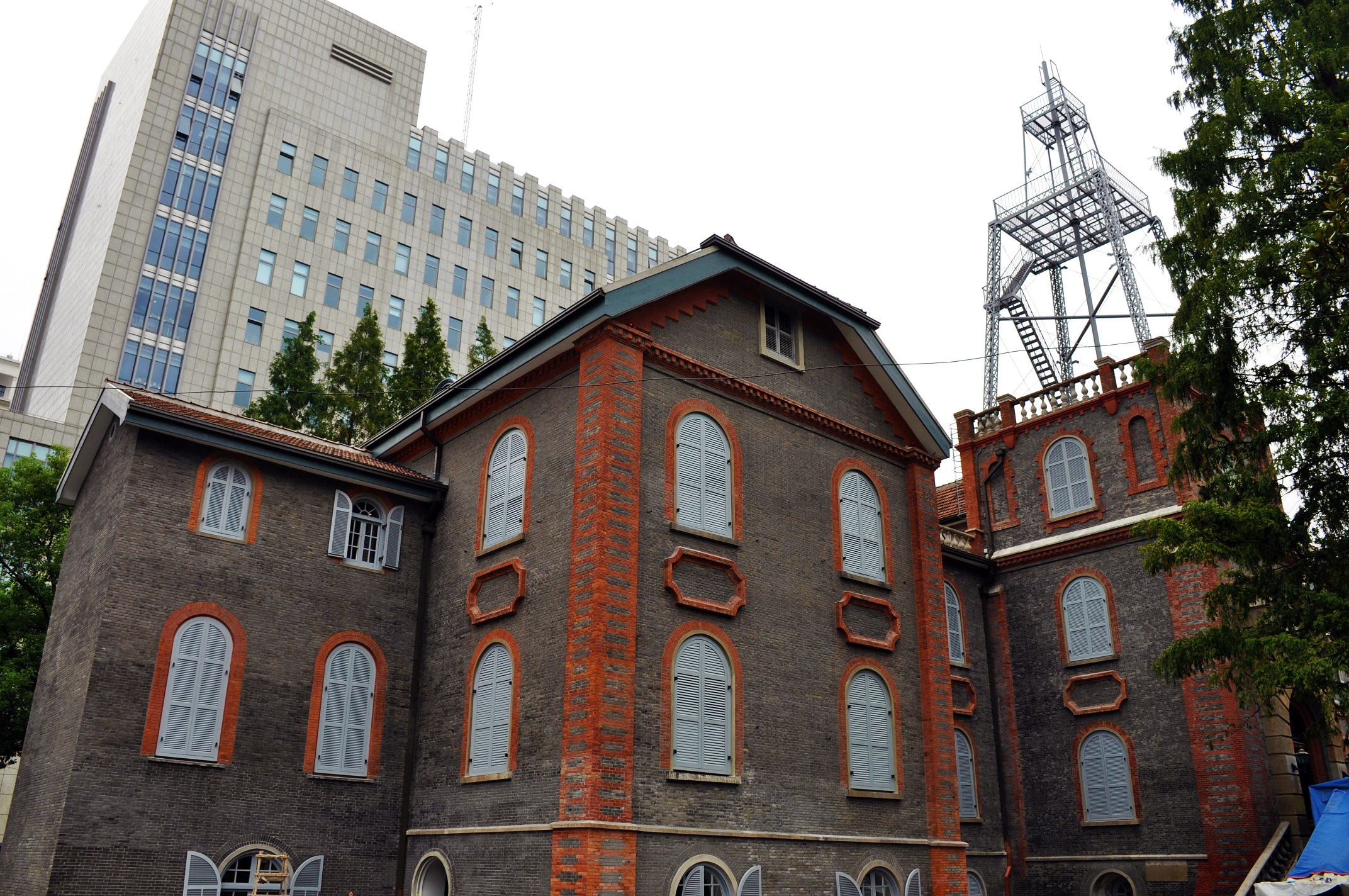
The former site of the Siccawei Observatory is now a part of the Shanghai Meteorological Center

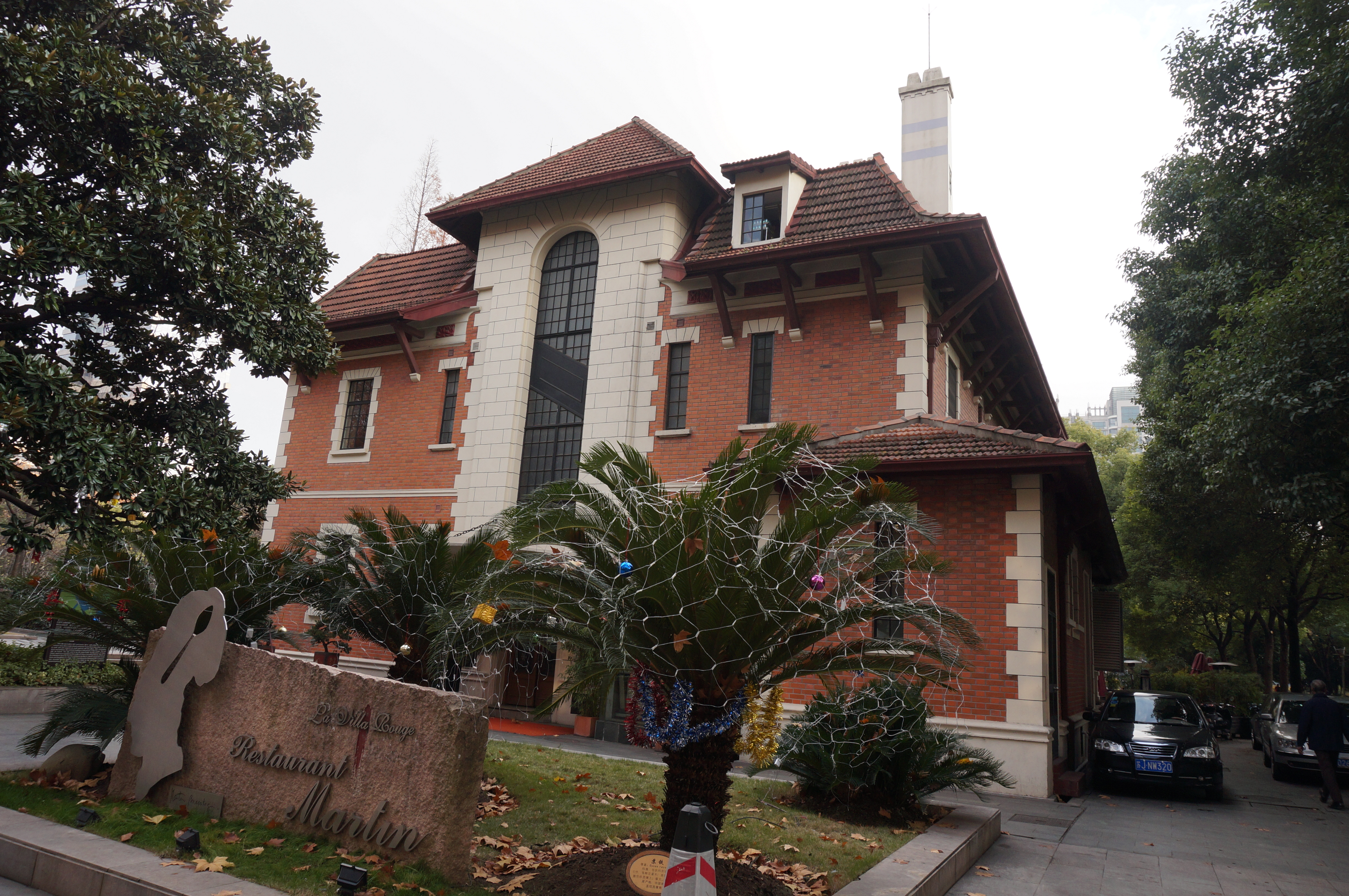
The former Site of Pathé

With land donated by Xu Guangqi's family and those acquired by other means, the Society of Jesus established a grand cathedral as well as an entire one square mile complex that covers most of present-day Xujiahui. In addition to the cathedral, the French Jesuits also built orphanages, monasteries, schools, libraries and the Xujiahui observatory. (which was established by Marc Dechevrens, now the Shanghai Bureau of Meteorology).

In time, it became a stronghold of Catholics in East Asia. Xujiahui was a major locus of missionary efforts throughout China, particularly for the Jesuits. One of the first structures to be built by the Jesuits was the St. Ignatius Cathedral in 1847, later reconstructed in 1906. The Cathedral is located on what is now known as North Caoxi Road and is still referred to in English as the St. Ignatius Cathedral. The sign on the street calls it simply "Catholic Church." The cathedral was featured in the opening scenes of Steven Spielberg's 1987 film Empire of the Sun.

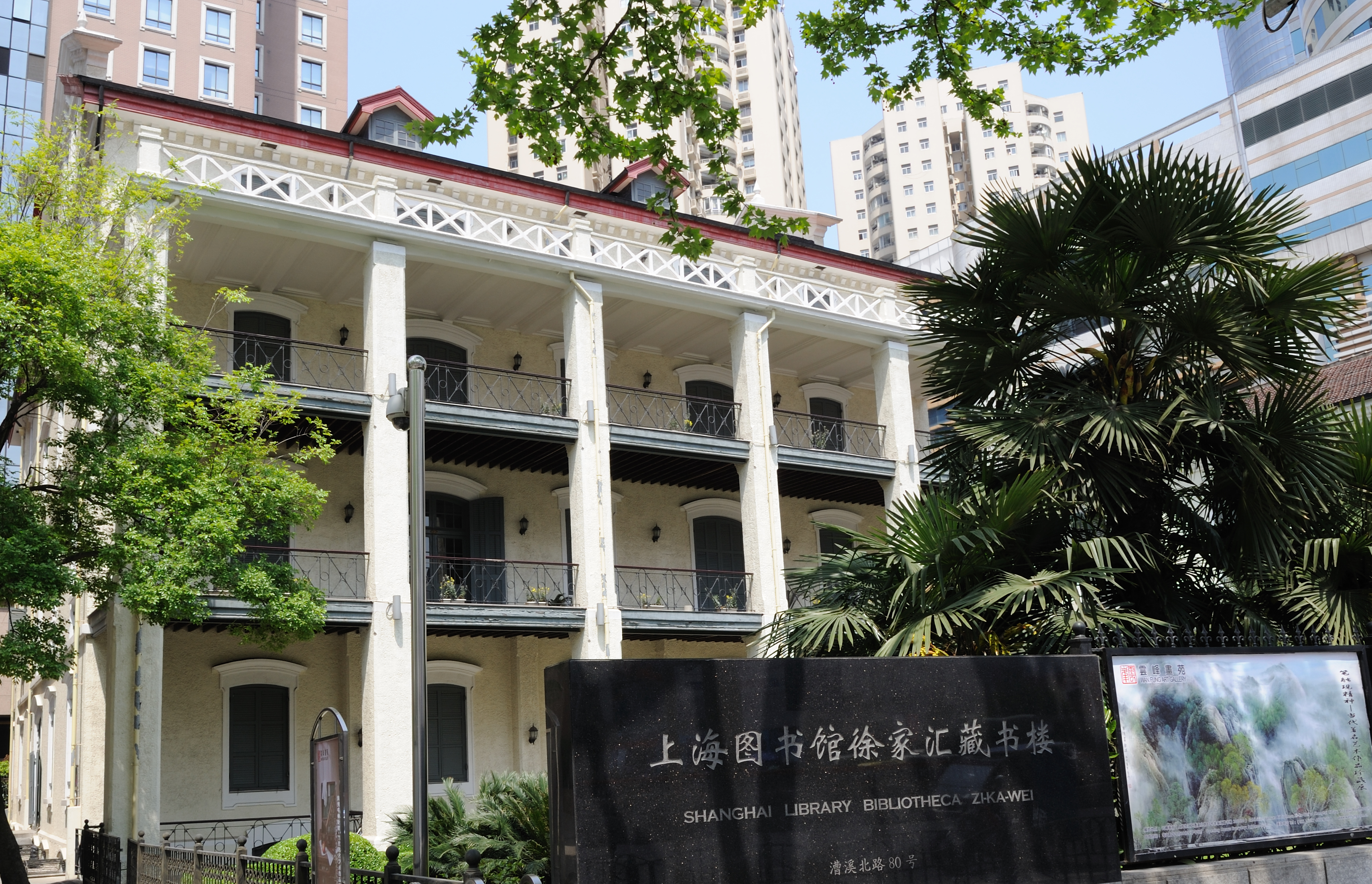
The Bibliotheca Zikawei, now a branch of the Shanghai Library.

A number of other structures survive from its days as a center of Catholicism. One is the Collège Saint Ignace or Xuhui College on 68 Hongqiao Road, now renamed Xuhui High School (or Xuhui Middle School). Established by Jesuits in 1850, Xuhui (St. Ignatius) College was the first educational institution in China to offer a fully western curriculum. Another is the Bibliotheca Zikawei (or Bibliothèque de Mission), now a branch of Shanghai Library, adjacent to the cathedral. Several of the convent buildings scattered around Xujiahui are still visible in various states of preservation: one (structurally modified but still recognizable) serves as the office of the Xuhui District Government and People's Procurate. The Tou-Se-We Orphanage (Mandarin: Tushanwan) operated by the church, whose workshops supplied much of the religious art on Xujiahui's religious buildings, is half a mile to the south of Xujiahui junction; the sole surviving building of the orphanage is now the Tou-Se-We Museum.

The educational institutions founded by the Catholic church led to Xujiahui's reputation as a center of education. The Aurora University was founded by the Jesuits in Xujiahui. The imperial Nanyang Public School system was founded in Xujiahui at the end of the 19th century, and the historic main campus of its most prominent descendent school, Jiao Tong University, one of Shanghai's most prestigious, is still located in Xujiahui. Fudan University, also one of Shanghai's most prestigious, was located in Xujiahui until 1922.

While central Xujiahui was administratively part of the Chinese area of Shanghai, it was in reality controlled by the Catholic Church, which was closely associated with the French authorities of the French Concession. From 1914, Xujiahui sat just outside the borders of the French Concession, and remained under heavy French influence.

Catholic Xujiahui came to an abrupt end with the Communist victory in the Chinese Civil War. A few years after the People's Liberation Army entered Shanghai, the Jesuits abandoned Xujiahui and relocated to nearby posts such as Macau or Manila. Many of those who remained were imprisoned by Communist authorities. These include Cardinal Ignatius Kung, who spent decades in prison, and Father Chang-min "Beda" Chang, who died in prison in November 1951.

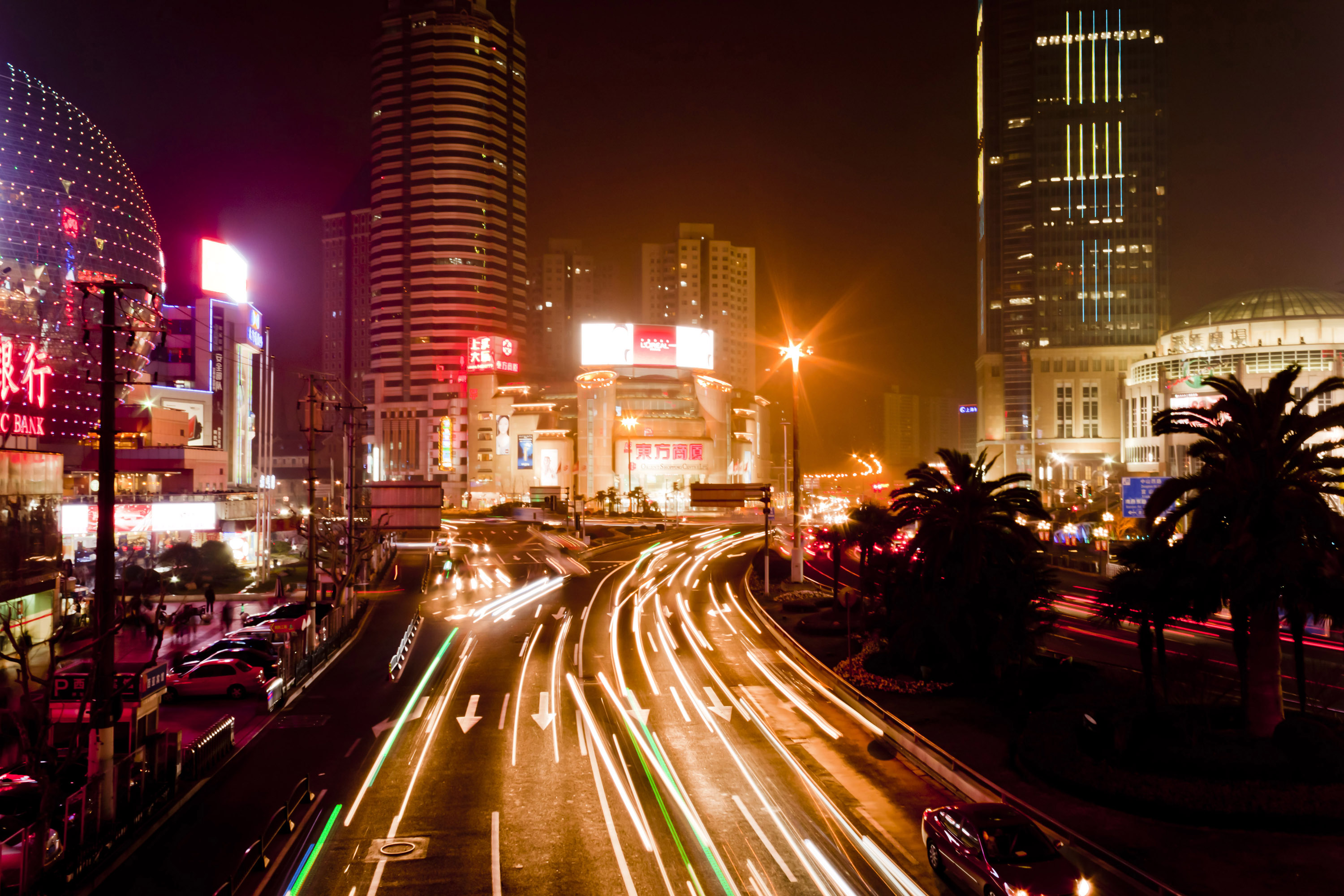
Xujiahui junction at night

From 1949 onwards, most of the large houses and estates in Xujiahui were compulsorily acquired or seized by the government and converted into factories. Up until the late 1990s, the area was predominantly an industrial area.

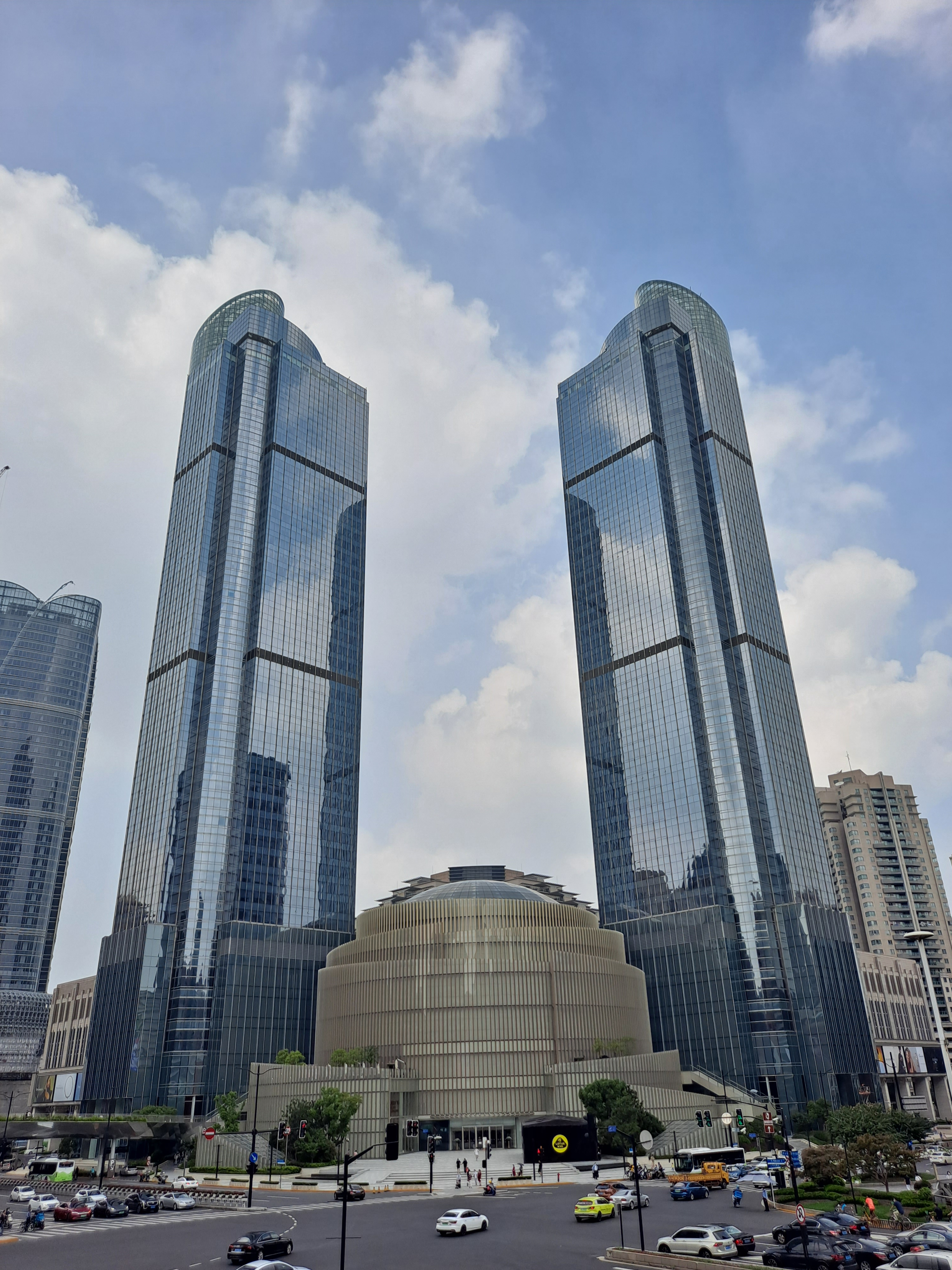
Grand Gateway at Xujiahui Circle

During the late 1990s, many of the state-owned factories were sold off and torn down. Xujiahui is now mainly a retail district of downtown Shanghai.

== Economy ==
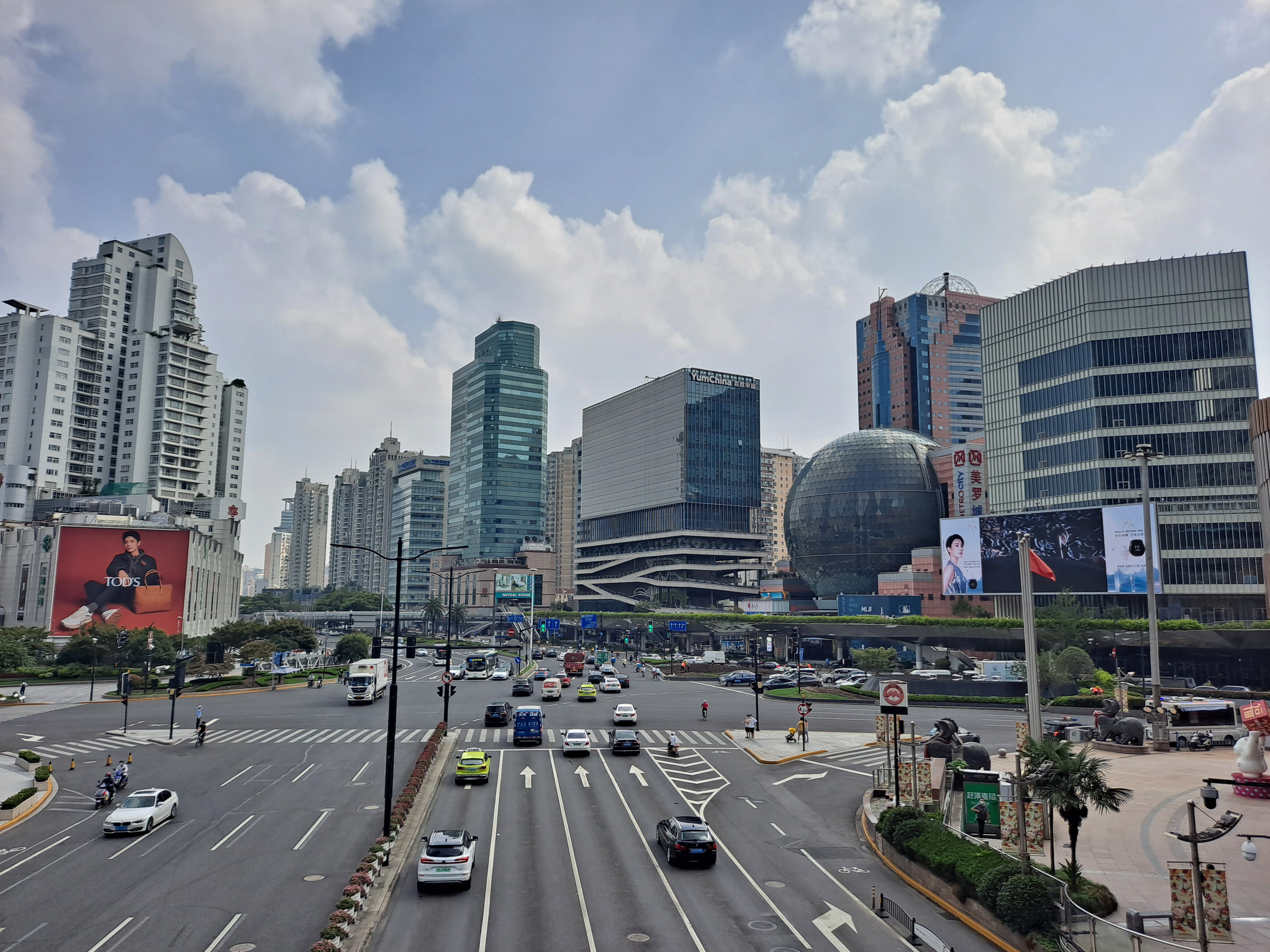
Xujiahui in 2022

Xujiahui today is mainly a commercial area, though the Catholic church retains a significant presence and there are still educational and scientific institutions in the area.

The main Xujiahui shopping district is centered on the intersection of the streets Hongqiao Rd, Huashan Rd, Zhaojiabang Rd and North Caoxi Rd. Each of these streets terminates at the intersection, which is home to three supermarkets, six major shopping malls and nine large-scale office towers. (Clockwise from Hongqiao Road, Grand Gateway, Huashan Road, Pacific Sogo, Hengshan Road Tunnel, Huijin Department Store, Zhaojiabang Road, Metro-City, North Caoxi Road, Oriental Shopping Mall.) Everything from cosmetics to cars to cucumbers is available within five minutes, but the type of product that Xujiahui is most famous for is electronics. It is one of the biggest places for people to get electronic equipment, from cameras to PSPs to Xboxes and modchips for those Xboxes and other game consoles as well. However, the biggest shopping mall for electronic equipment has closed in 2016. Currently, a brand new shopping center is under construction, it is located on Hongqiao Road, right beside the Grand Gateway. The new shopping center will officially open in 2016.

== Climate ==
Climate data for Xujiahui, elevation 5 m (16 ft), (1991–2020 normals, extremes 1951–present)
Month	Jan	Feb	Mar	Apr	May	Jun	Jul	Aug	Sep	Oct	Nov	Dec	Year
Record high °C (°F)	21.6 (70.9)	27.0 (80.6)	29.5 (85.1)	33.9 (93.0)	36.7 (98.1)	38.5 (101.3)	40.9 (105.6)	40.8 (105.4)	38.2 (100.8)	36.0 (96.8)	28.5 (83.3)	23.4 (74.1)	40.9 (105.6)
Mean daily maximum °C (°F)	8.7 (47.7)	10.7 (51.3)	14.9 (58.8)	20.9 (69.6)	25.8 (78.4)	28.6 (83.5)	33.2 (91.8)	32.6 (90.7)	28.7 (83.7)	23.5 (74.3)	17.8 (64.0)	11.3 (52.3)	21.4 (70.5)
Daily mean °C (°F)	5.4 (41.7)	7.0 (44.6)	10.7 (51.3)	16.1 (61.0)	21.3 (70.3)	24.7 (76.5)	29.1 (84.4)	28.8 (83.8)	25.1 (77.2)	19.9 (67.8)	14.3 (57.7)	7.9 (46.2)	17.5 (63.5)
Mean daily minimum °C (°F)	2.9 (37.2)	4.1 (39.4)	7.6 (45.7)	12.6 (54.7)	17.9 (64.2)	22.0 (71.6)	26.2 (79.2)	26.2 (79.2)	22.5 (72.5)	17.1 (62.8)	11.4 (52.5)	5.3 (41.5)	14.7 (58.4)
Record low °C (°F)	−10.1 (13.8)	−7.9 (17.8)	−5.4 (22.3)	−0.5 (31.1)	6.9 (44.4)	12.3 (54.1)	16.3 (61.3)	18.8 (65.8)	10.8 (51.4)	1.7 (35.1)	−4.2 (24.4)	−8.5 (16.7)	−10.1 (13.8)
Average precipitation mm (inches)	72.2 (2.84)	65.0 (2.56)	97.3 (3.83)	84.2 (3.31)	91.0 (3.58)	224.9 (8.85)	163.2 (6.43)	225.9 (8.89)	131.5 (5.18)	69.6 (2.74)	61.4 (2.42)	50.4 (1.98)	1,336.6 (52.61)
Average precipitation days (≥ 0.1 mm)	10.6	10.4	12.7	11.3	11.2	14.3	12.2	12.7	10.1	7.5	9.2	8.5	130.7
Average snowy days	2.1	1.8	0.5	0.0	0	0	0	0	0	0	0.1	0.9	5.4
Average relative humidity (%)	71	71	70	69	70	79	76	76	74	70	71	69	72
Mean monthly sunshine hours	114.3	119.9	128.5	148.5	169.8	130.9	190.8	185.7	167.5	161.4	131.1	127.4	1,775.8
Source: China Meteorological Administration (sun 1981–2010) all-time extreme temperature

== Education ==
The historic main campus of the Shanghai Jiao Tong University is located in Xujiahui, to the north of the Xujiahui junction. While due to space limitations the university has moved its undergraduate department to a new campus on the outskirts of Shanghai, the Xujiahui campus still houses the university's School of International Education and several research institutes. The campus is notable for a number of historic buildings dating from the early 20th century, including its imperial-style gate and remnants of the imperial-style marble bridges, reflecting the university's former status as the Imperial Polytechnic.

The former Collège Saint Ignace, founded in 1850 and now Xuhui High School, is still in Xujiahui.

The former Shanghai Medical University, now Fudan University Shanghai Medical College, is located close to Xujiahui metro station.

The Bibliotheca Zi-Ka-Wei (Xujiahui Library) is in the area.

== Parks ==
On the location of a former brick factory now stands the Xujiahui park, which was completed in 2002. The park also contains a manmade meandering brook (miniature model of the course of the Huangpu River), basketball courts, and a children's playground. The park is traversed by a roughly 250 meter (820 feet)-long elevated pathway. The eastern part of the park features the historic Red House, which once housed the Pathé China record company. The Shanghai Conservatory of Music - also located in Xuhui district - often stages free performances during the Spring and Autumn months in the park, as these are the times when weather in Shanghai is the best.

The other notable park in Xujiahui is Guangqi Park, which features the tomb of Xu Guangqi, after whom the area and district are ultimately named. The tomb, recently restored according to its original set-up, is a curious combination of a large Christian cross as the grave marker, with a traditional Chinese "spirit way" lined with stone animals. Also located in the park is a traditional house relocated here as a result of urban redevelopment elsewhere in the district.

== Transportation ==
The main intersection at Xujiahui is a transportation hub. It is served by dozens of bus routes, and by the Xujiahui metro station on Lines 1, 9 and 11 of the Shanghai Metro.

== Xujiahui Subdistrict ==
Xujiahui Subdistrict was established in May 1994 as a subdistrict of Xuhui District, Shanghai. The subdistrict covers 4.04 square kilometers (1.56 sq mi). There are 31,624 households which total 94,872 residents. There are roughly 110,000 permanent residents in the district. The subdistrict is not co-extensive with the geographical locality.

== See also ==
- Tomb of Xu Guangqi
- Tushanwan
