= Metro-City =

Shopping mall in Shanghai, China

Coordinates: 31.193°N 121.439°E

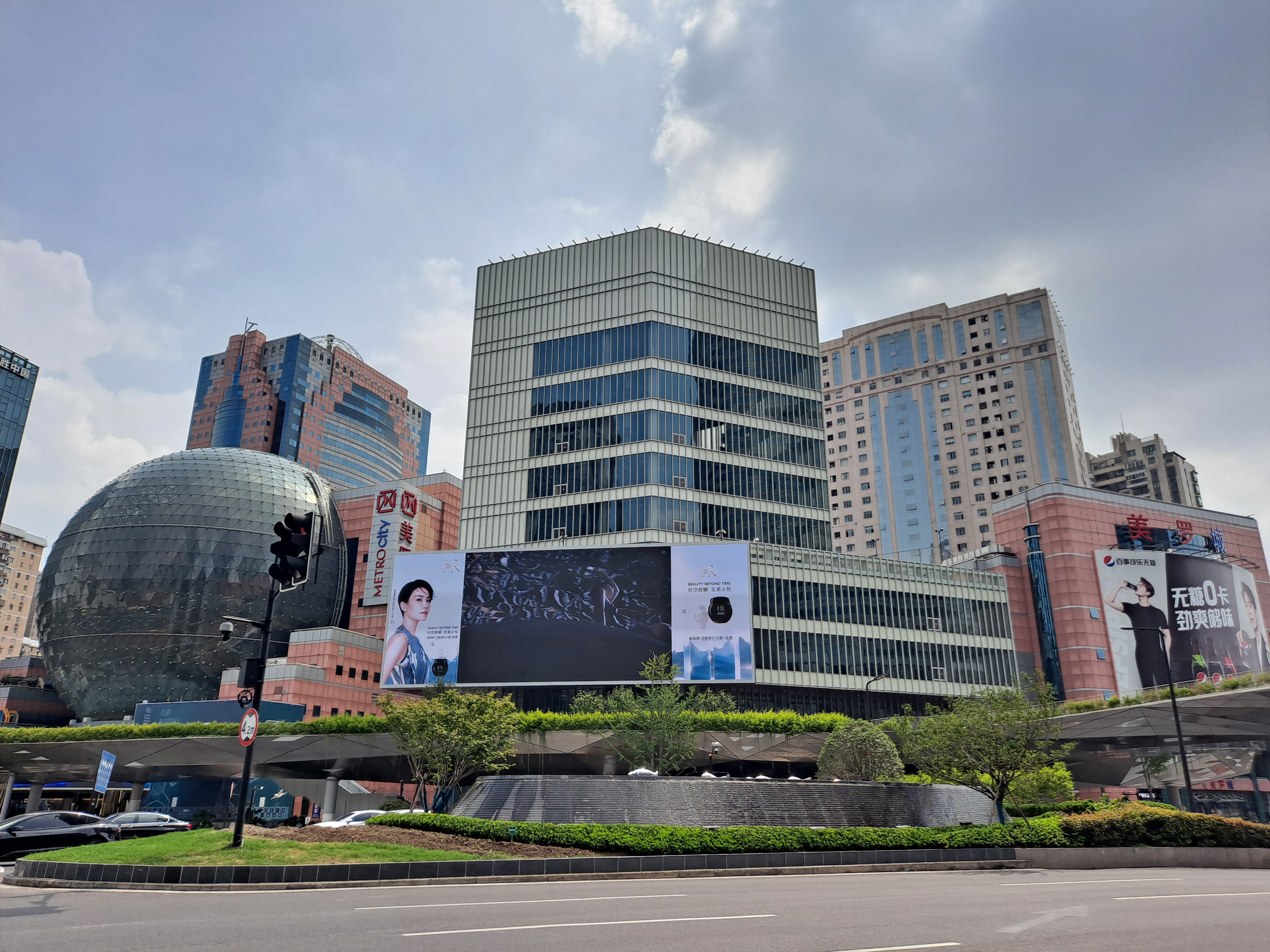
Metro-City in daytime

Metro-City (Chinese: 美罗城; pinyin: Měiluō Chéng) is a shopping mall in the Xujiahui area of Shanghai, China. It was built in 1989 and serves as one of the landmarks of the area, much because of the surrounding gigantic hemispherical structure that glows by evening.

It is known for being the main electronics market in Shanghai, since most of its floors are occupied by sellers of computers, cameras, mobile phones, video-game consoles, etc. It is also home to many restaurants and cafés while there is a cinema on the top floor.
