= Bibliotheca Zi-Ka-Wei =

First modern library in Shanghai

Coordinates: 31°11′31.5″N 121°26′15.4″E

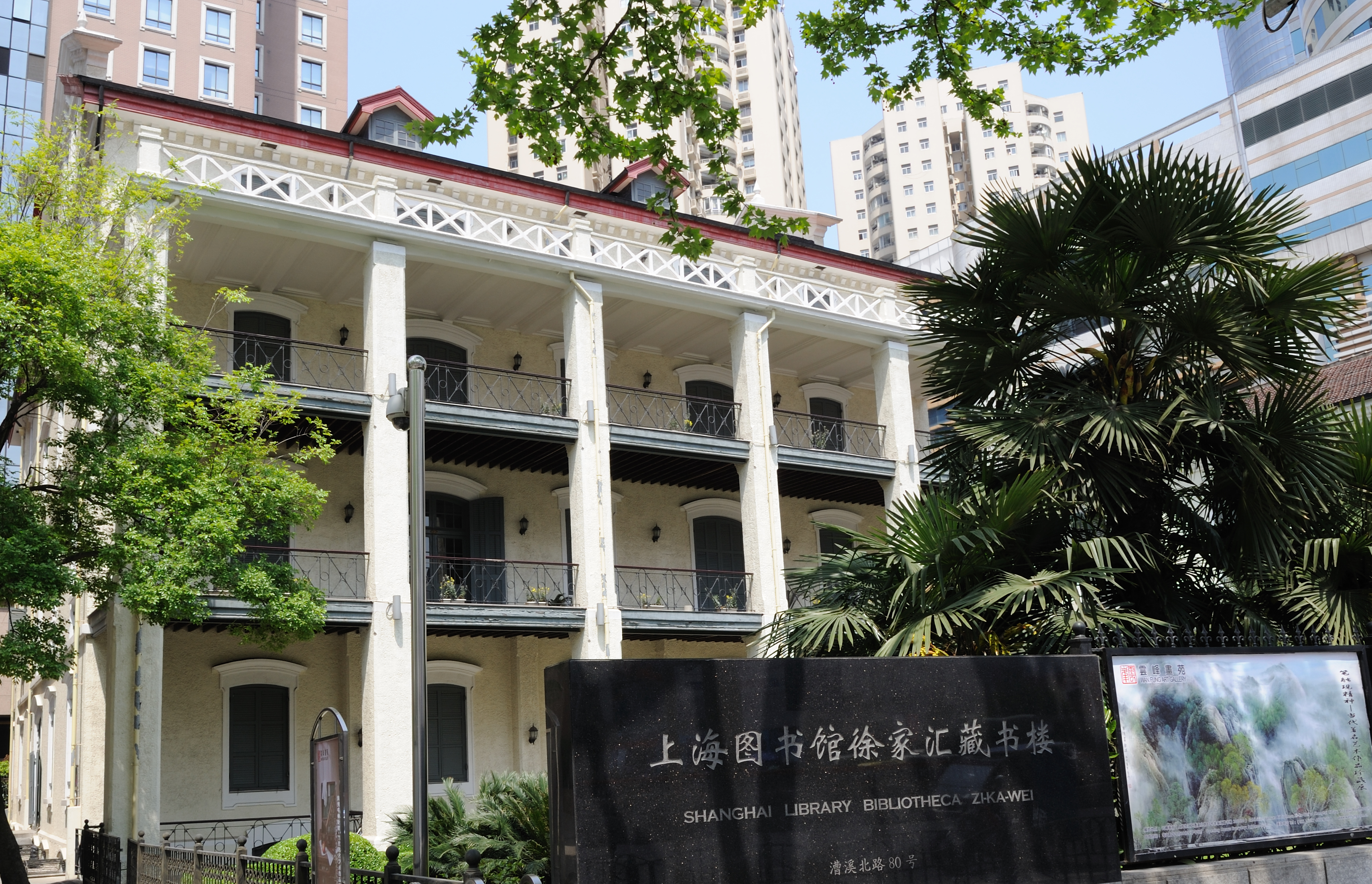
- Location: Shanghai, China
- Established: 1847

Bibliotheca Zi-Ka-Wei
- Simplified Chinese: 上海图书馆徐家汇藏书楼
- Traditional Chinese: 上海圖書館徐家匯藏書樓
Transcriptions
Standard Mandarin
- Hanyu Pinyin: Shànghǎi Túshūguǎn Xújiāhuì Cángshū Lóu

The Shanghai Library Bibliotheca Zi-Ka-Wei (Chinese: 上海图书馆徐家汇藏书楼; pinyin: Shànghǎi Túshūguǎn Xújiāhuì Cángshū Lóu, Shanghainese: Zånhae Dusyukuoe Zikawe Zånsyu Leu), also known as the Bibliotheque de Mission, is the first modern library to be established in Shanghai, China. Located in the Xujiahui area in Xuhui District, it first opened in 1847. It is a part of the Shanghai Library system. Some materials that are housed here originate from Shanghai Library.

== History ==
The Xujiahui Library began with the arrival of three Jesuit missionaries in 1842: Frs. Claude Gotteland (1803-1856), the head of the mission, François Estève (1804-1848), and Benjamin Brueyre (1808-1880). As the missionary work progressed over the next five years, it became clear that a permanent place of residence was needed, in part to provide a place for newly arrived missionaries to study Chinese and prepare for their work. The site chosen was the village of Xujiahui (pronounced Zikawei in Shanghainese), five miles southwest of Shanghai, although the area has since been annexed into Shanghai municipality. Fr. Gotteland also made the decision to set aside space for a collection of books supporting the missionaries' study and work upon their arrival at Xujiahui. It was from these modest beginnings that the Xujiahui Library (Zikawei Library), which would become one of the two foremost Jesuit libraries in China (the other being the Beitang Library), was established in 1847.

The library was originally housed in three rooms in the mission priests' quarters on the north side of the existing chapel. Then in 1860, the Jesuits added to their land holdings in Xujiahui, and the library was moved east of the Zhaojiabang Canal and that building was enlarged. By 1897 the library's holdings had once again outgrown the space. Plans were drawn up for a new two-story, twelve-room library, which was completed in 1906. This new library building was divided into a Chinese style first floor area for materials in Chinese and a Western language section on the second floor. This library was referred to by several names, known from the stamps of ownership inside the books in the library. These names included Zi-ka-wei Reservata Bibliotheca, Bibliotheca Zi-ka-wei, Zi-ka-wei Bibliothèque de Mission, Zi-ka-wei Bibliotheca Major, and in Chinese, Shanghai Xujiahui Tianzhutang Cangshulou ("Library of the Catholic Church of Xujiahui, Shanghai"). Local people in the area called the big building among the old ginkgo trees simply "The Great Library."

At its height, the Xujiahui Library collection included over 100,000 titles in 200,000 volumes: 80,000 volumes in European languages and 120,000 volumes in Chinese. After the destruction of the Oriental Library (Dongfang Tushuguan) in 1932 by Japanese militarists, it was the largest library in Shanghai. Besides its extensive holdings of gazetteers, the Xujiahui Library also held early, rare newspapers and magazines. The European language collection of the Xujiahui Library was made up of books in over ten different languages, including Hebrew, Latin, Greek, and other European languages. The library owned major dictionaries and encyclopedias from all over the world and important scholarly journals to aid the Jesuits in their studies, as well as over two thousand pre-1800 rare editions.

It became a branch of the Shanghai Library system in 1956 and was renovated in 2003.

== See also ==
- List of Jesuit sites
