= Marc Dechevrens =

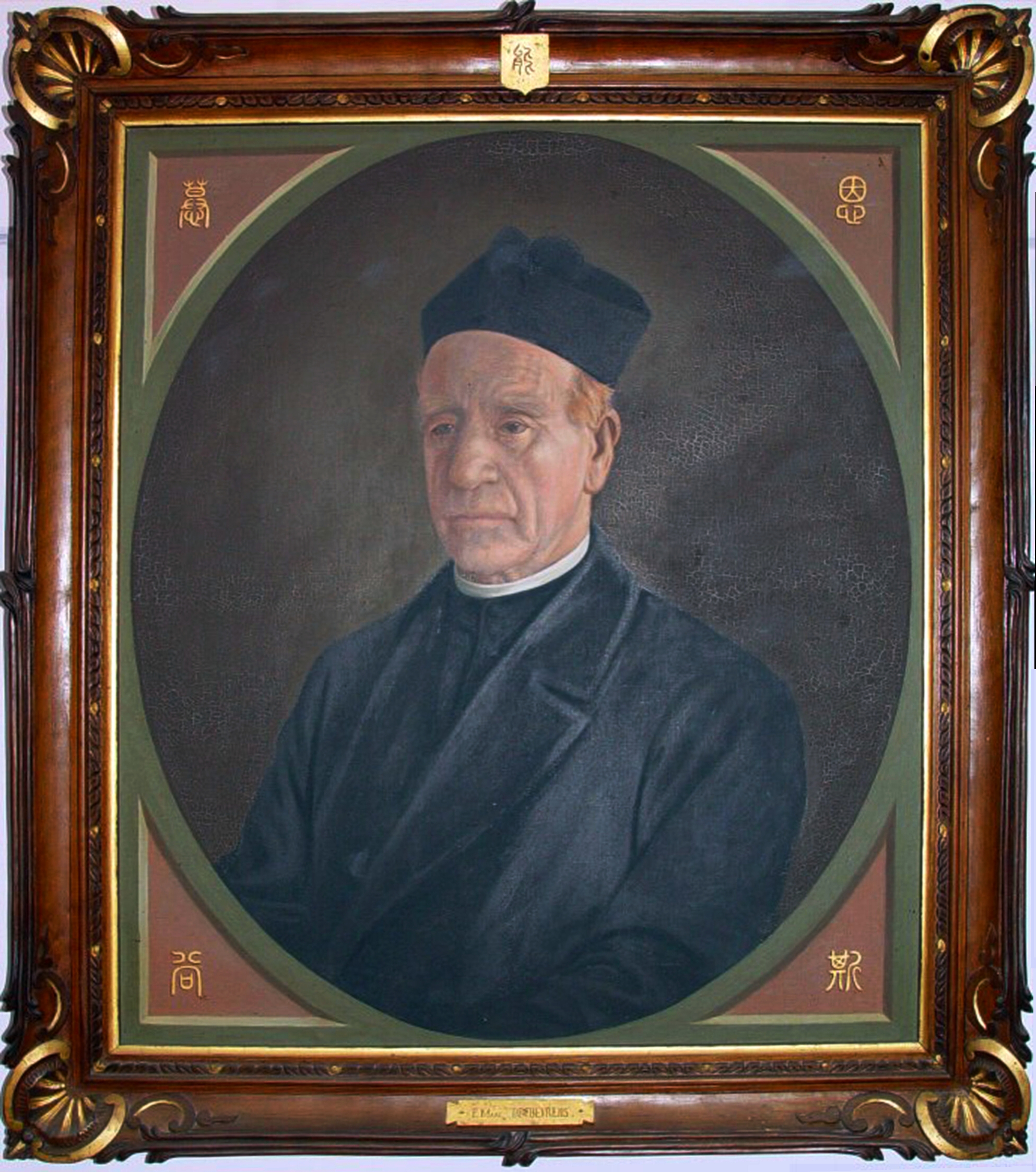
Portrait

Marc-Antoine Dechevrens (26 July 1845 – 6 December 1923) was a Swiss Jesuit priest who worked in China where he was involved in running Zikawei meteorology observatory and became interested in forecasting typhoons in the South China Sea. He was also involved in setting up the Maison St Louis Observatory on Jersey Island in 1894. He was among the pioneer meteorologists interested in upper air circulation and vertical movement of air in the formation of cyclones.

== Life and work ==
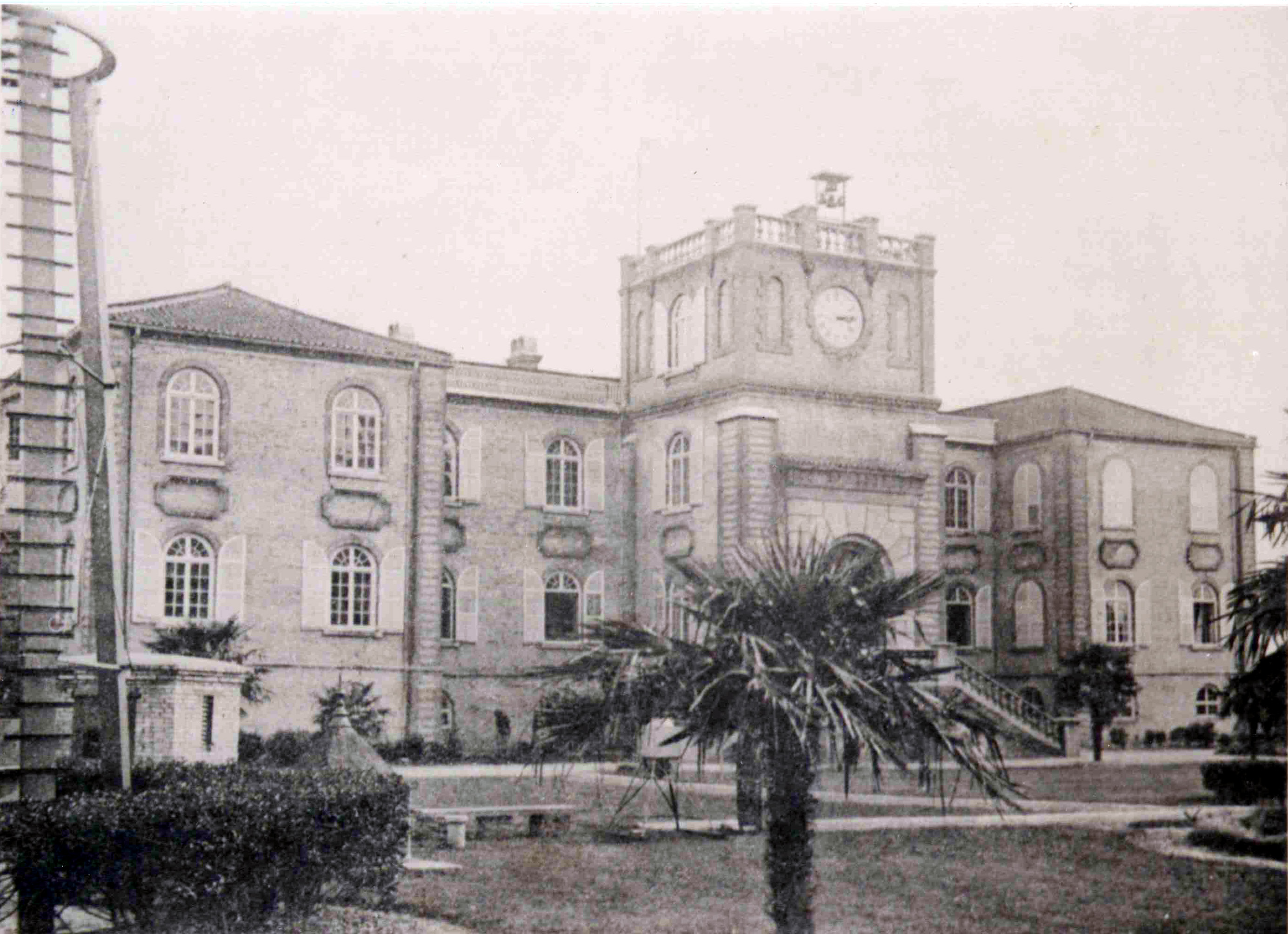
Zikawei observatory, c. 1900

Dechevrens was born in Chêne-Thônex near Geneva and joined the Society of Jesus in 1862. He studied theology from 1866 and in 1869 he went to study philosophy and natural science at the Scolasticat de Laval. He then taught at the Jesuit college in Vannes and Vaugirard. He was ordained in 1873 and selected to work at the Jesuit observatory at Zi-ka-weϊ near Shanghai. He trained briefly in meteorology at Stonyhurst College, Lancashire. He became a director of the observatory in 1875. His work included the recording of geo-magnetism, temperature, pressure, humidity, rain and wind-speed. He was interested in studying wind-speeds above the level where ground turbulence affected readings and had anemometers fixed on 30 m high towers. He published annual reports and became particularly interested in tropical cyclones after experiencing and studying one on 31 July 1879. Using a telegraphy network he collected data from a network of 50 stations along the Chinese coast to predict typhoons. He was involved in setting up warnings using flags at Shanghai Harbour.

He also established a time standardization service at Shanghai harbour in 1884 to aid mariners in determining longitudes more accurately. The British observatory in Hong Kong under William Doberck saw him as a rival. Dechevrens noted that cyclones in the mid-latitudes had an eye that was cold which was against the prevailing theory.

Dechevrens modified many of the instruments for his studies, including an anemometer for vertical air movement, and measurement of atmospheric electrical charge. Apart from meteorology, he also had an interest in mathematics and designed an instrument similar to the spirograph that he called the "campylograph". This was designed around 1900 with the aim of depicting the epi-cycloid motions of planets as seen from the earth, but also to more generically create such curves.

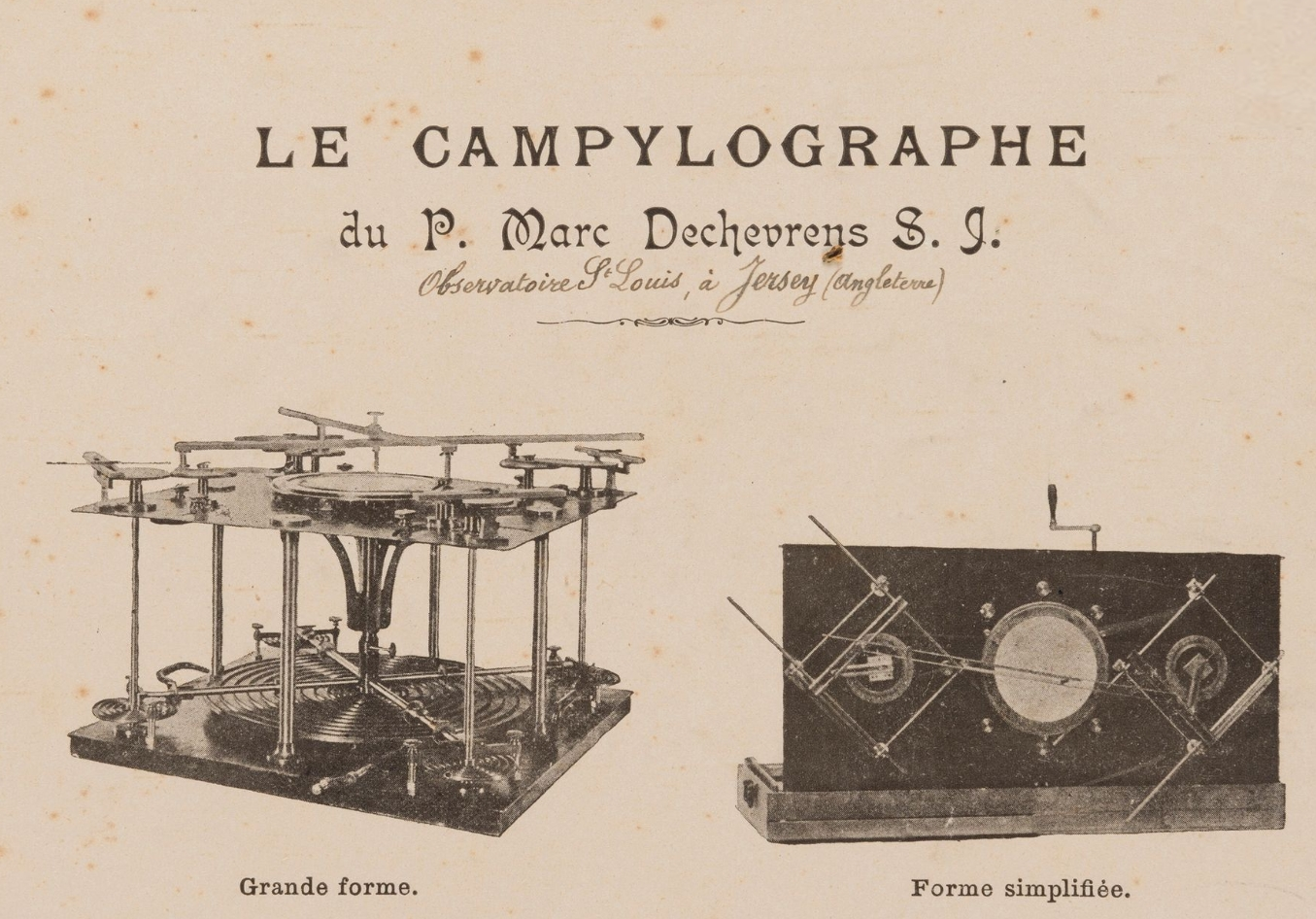
The Campylograph

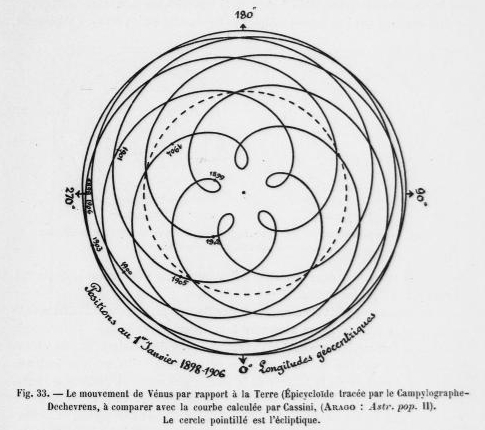
Path of Venus as drawn using the Campylograph

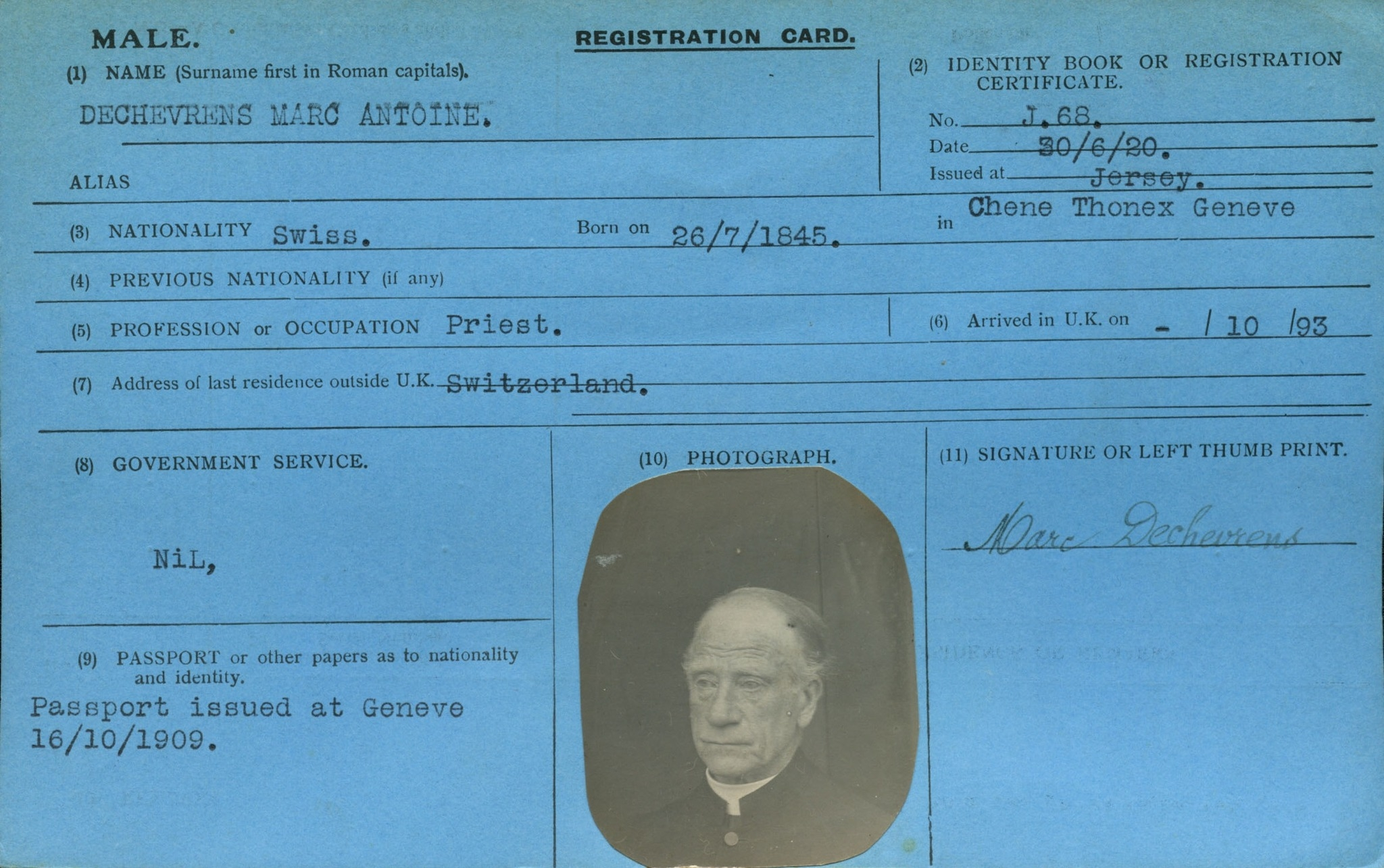
Jersey registration card, 1920

In 1887, following severe dysentery and poor health he returned to Europe, teaching briefly at Constantinople in 1891. He moved to Jersey Island in 1893 where he was involved in directing the Maison St Louis Observatory. He produced regular meteorological reports until the outbreak of World War I. His health deteriorated and he died in 1923.
